= Northwest Ohio =

Area in Ohio

Coordinates: 41°N 84°W

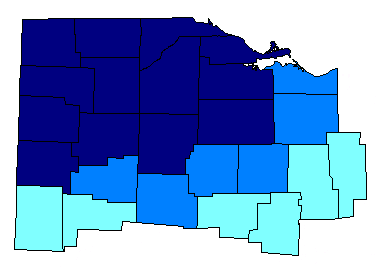
What is considered to be Northwest Ohio, with the dark-blue colored counties always included, the middle shade of blue counties being included some of the time, and the lightest colored blue counties being included the least. The lighter the shade, the more debatable it is. With the exception of Marion County, all of the counties primarily belong to the 419/567 area code.

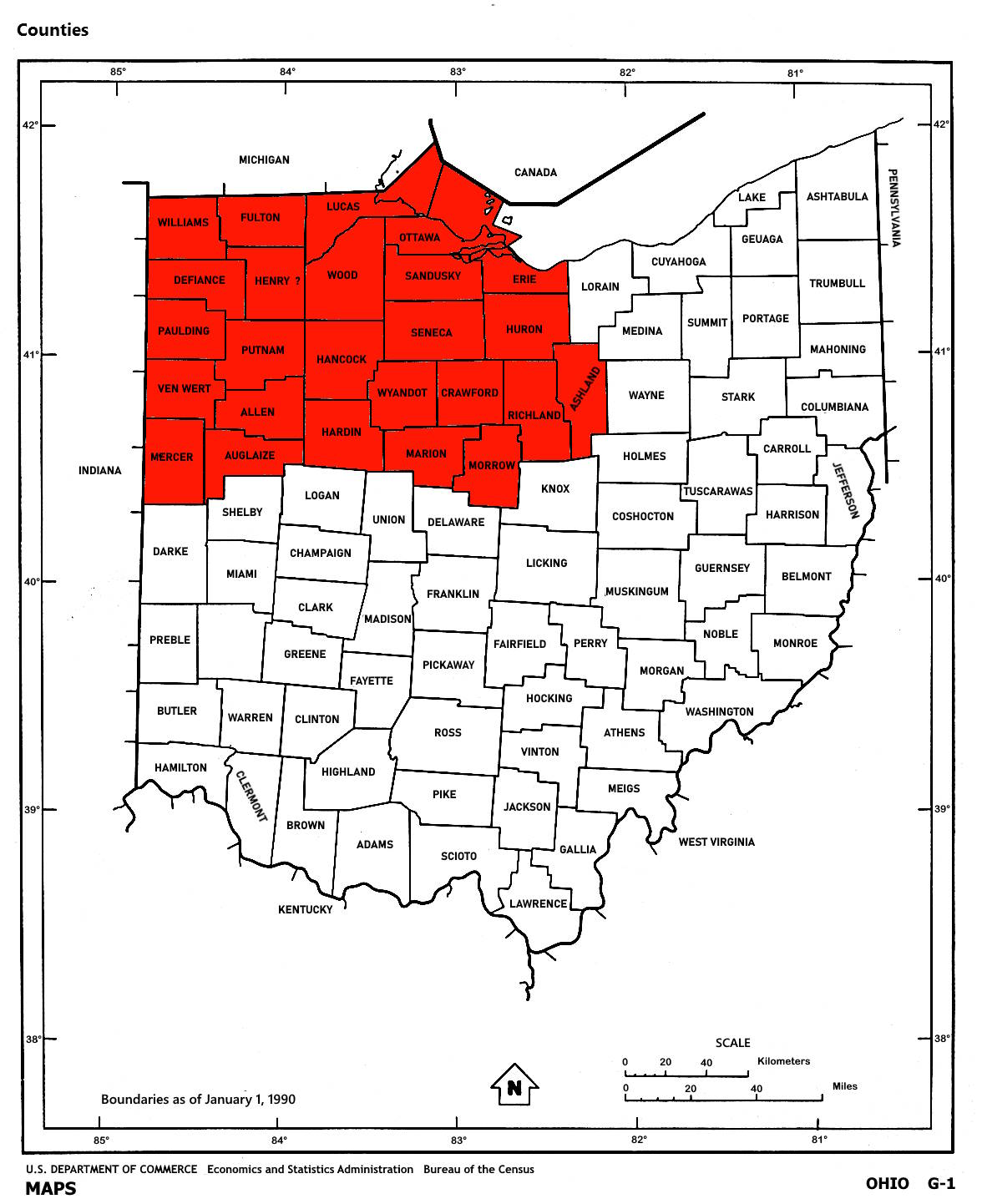
Map of Ohio counties, with the northwest region emphasized.

Northwest Ohio, or Northwestern Ohio, consists of multiple counties in the northwestern corner of the US state of Ohio. This area borders Lake Erie, Southeast Michigan, and northeastern Indiana. Some areas are also considered the Black Swamp area. The Toledo metropolitan area is part of the region.

Northwest Ohio's population in 2000 was 1,639,144 and is declining, specifically in the northern regions (counties shaded in the darker blue and Allen County). However, southern areas, such as Marion and Morrow counties, and the city of Findlay are growing.

== Largest municipalities ==
Toledo is the principal city of Northwest Ohio. Most of the region's television channels and radio stations are licensed in Toledo, Perrysburg or nearby Bowling Green. Though Toledo is an industrial city, Northwest Ohio is primarily agricultural with small centers of commerce distributed across region. Since the 1970s, the population of Lucas County and the Toledo metropolitan area has declined, though Wood and Hancock counties have had moderate population growth.

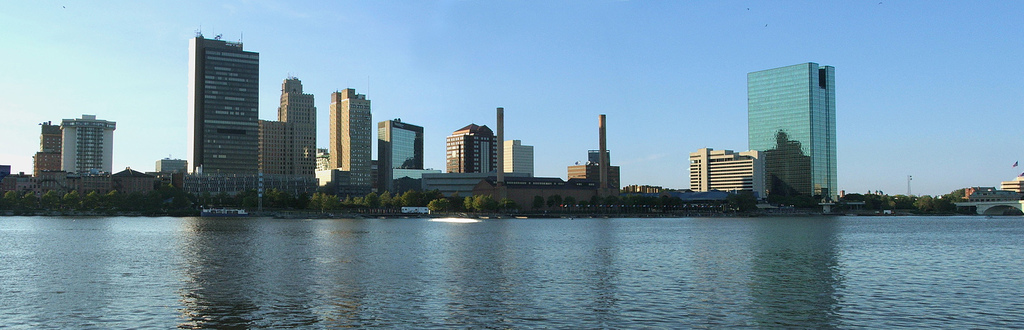
Toledo is the region's principal and largest city

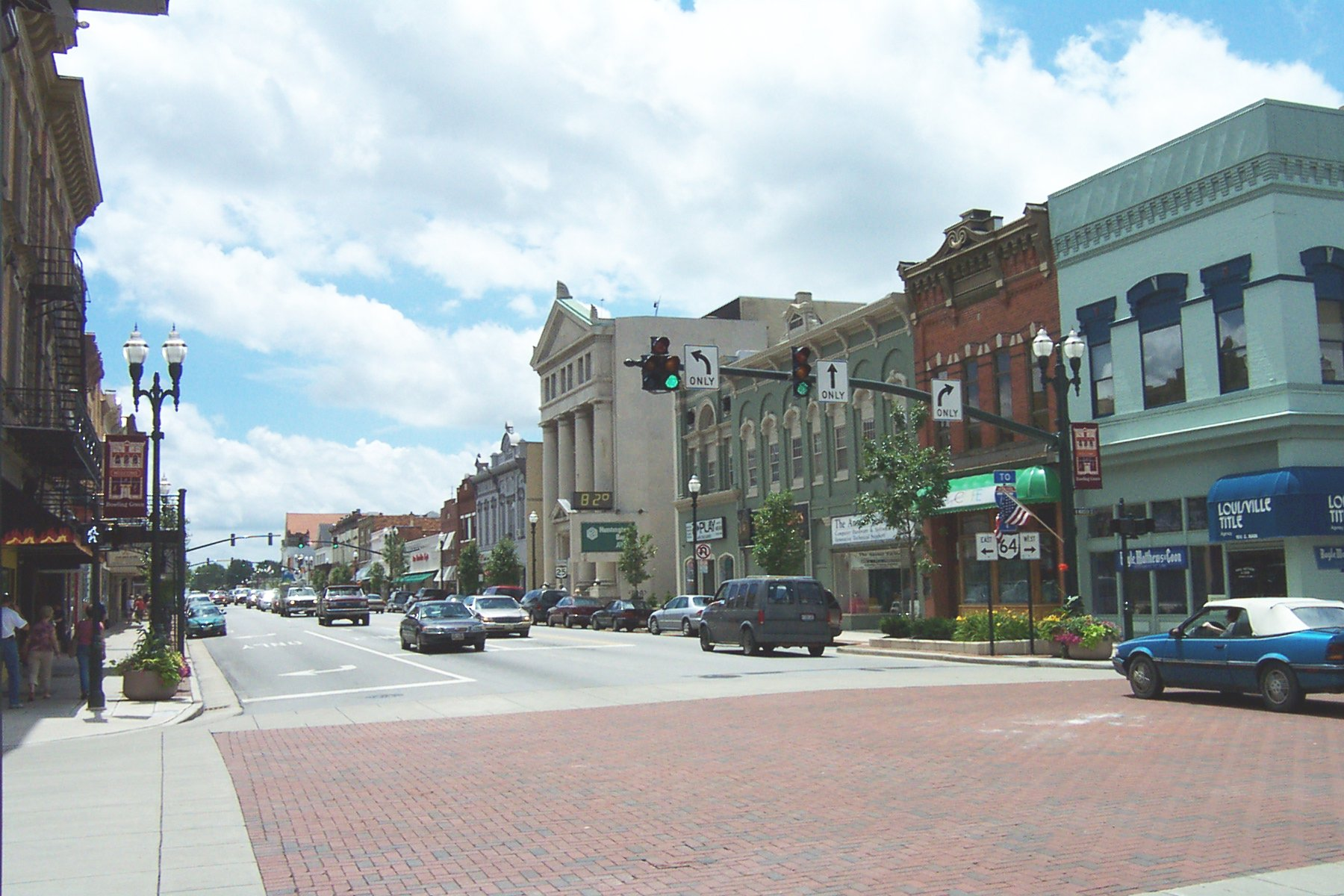
Bowling Green is Northwest Ohio's fourth largest city, and largest Toledo suburb

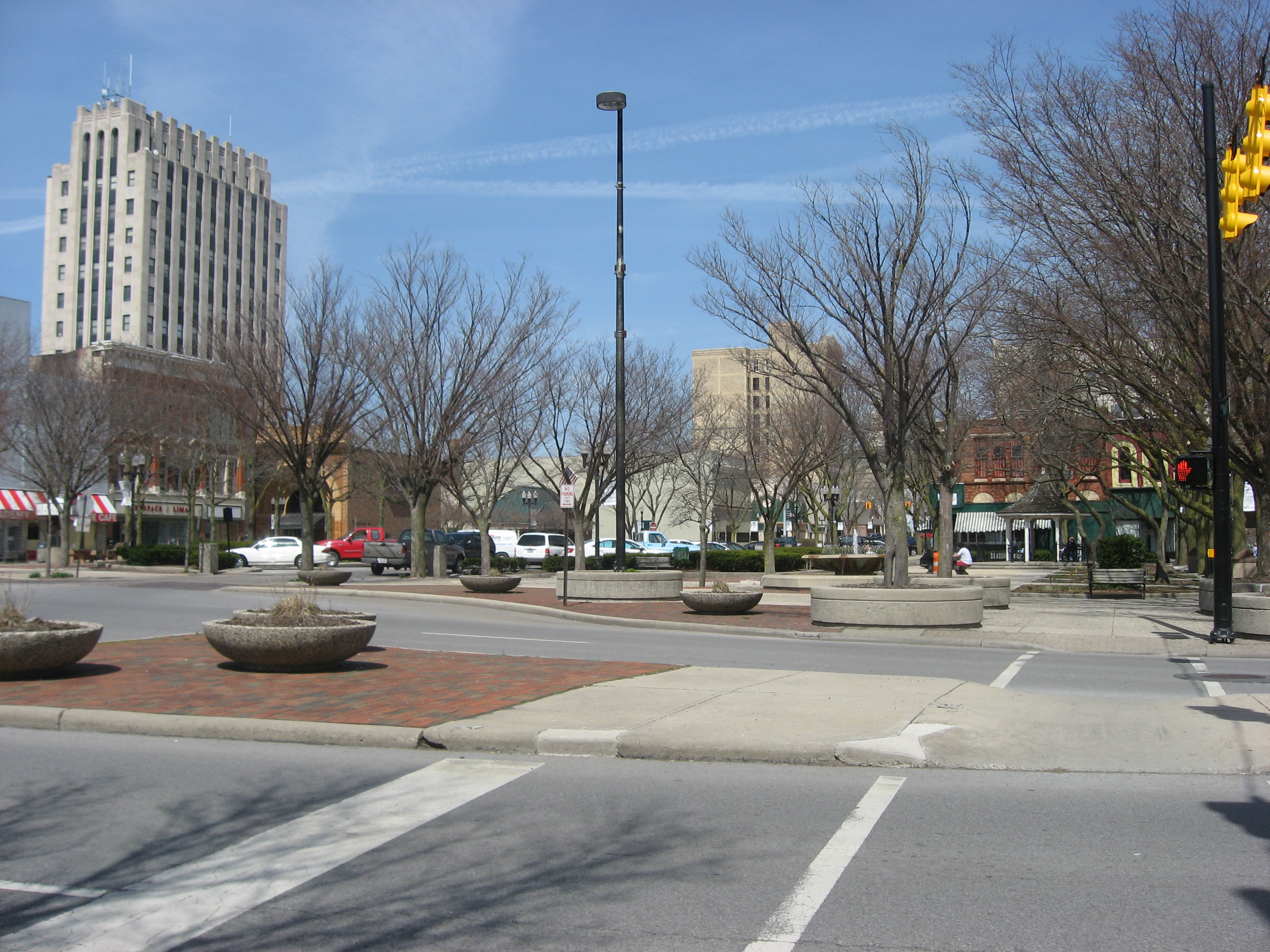
Downtown Lima, Ohio on a late March day

2018 rank	City	County	2018 estimate	2010 Census	Change	Highest Population (Year)	Metropolitan Statistical Area
1	Toledo	Lucas	274,975	287,208	−4.26%	383,818 (1970)	Toledo, OH Metropolitan Statistical Area
2	Findlay	Hancock	41,324	41,202	+0.30%	41,324 (2018)	Findlay, OH Micropolitan Statistical Area
3	Lima	Allen	36,862	38,771	−4.92%	53,734 (1970)	Lima, OH Metropolitan Statistical Area
4	Bowling Green	Wood	31,578	30,028	+5.16%	31,578 (2018)	Toledo, OH Metropolitan Statistical Area
5	Perrysburg	Wood	21,570	20,623	+4.59%	21,570 (2018)	Toledo, OH Metropolitan Statistical Area
6	Sylvania	Lucas	19,030	18,965	+0.34%	19,030 (2018)	Toledo, OH Metropolitan Statistical Area
7	Tiffin	Seneca	17,953	17,963	−0.06%	21,596 (1970)	Tiffin, OH Micropolitan Statistical Area
8	Defiance	Defiance	16,663	16,494	+1.02%	16,783 (1980)	Defiance, OH Micropolitan Statistical Area
9	Fremont	Sandusky	16,034	16,734	−4.18%	18,767 (1960)	Fremont, OH Micropolitan Statistical Area
10	Maumee	Lucas	13,722	14,286	−3.95%	15,937 (1970)	Toledo, OH Metropolitan Statistical Area

=== Places considered within northwest Ohio ===
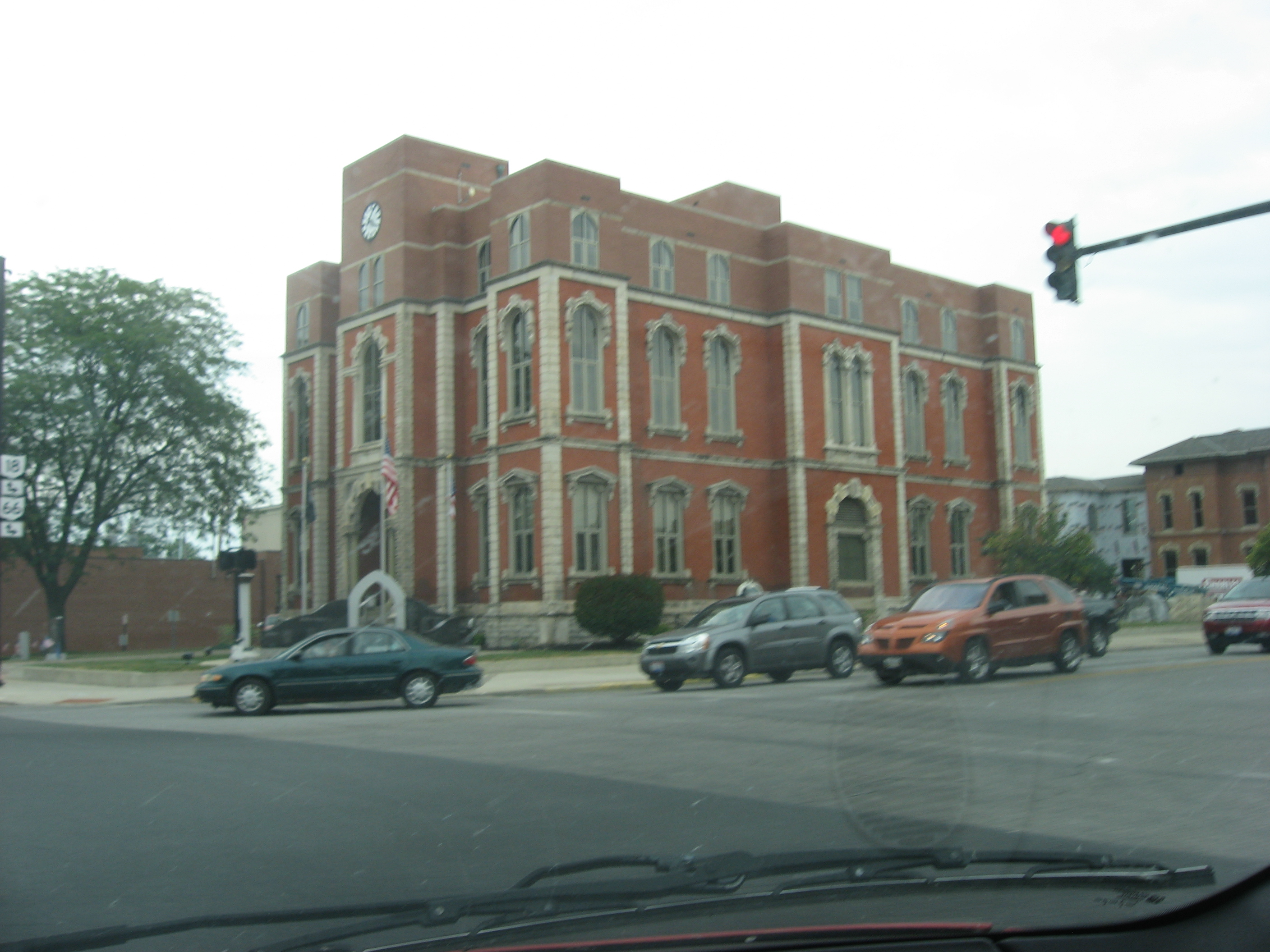
Defiance, Ohio is the seventh largest town in the region

These places are or may be classified as being in Northwestern Ohio, depending on the definition being applied:

=== Counties and county seats ===
- Allen –
  Lima
- Auglaize –
  Wapakoneta
- Defiance –
  Defiance
- Fulton –
  Wauseon
- Hancock –
  Findlay
- Hardin –
  Kenton
- Henry –
  Napoleon
- Huron –
  Norwalk
- Lucas –
  Toledo
- Marion –
  Marion
- Mercer –
  Celina
- Morrow –
  Mount Gilead
- Ottawa –
  Port Clinton
- Paulding –
  Paulding
- Putnam –
  Ottawa
- Sandusky –
  Fremont
- Seneca –
  Tiffin
- Van Wert –
  Van Wert
- Williams –
  Bryan
- Wood –
  Bowling Green
- Wyandot –
  Upper Sandusky

=== Other cities, villages, and townships ===
If a city is a county seat, it has been listed above according to the county in which it lies. Many of the cities, townships, and villages in Northwest Ohio are clustered in the Toledo MSA. This list is incomplete.

==== Cities ====
- Bellevue
- Clyde
- Crestline
- Delphos
- Fostoria
- Galion
- Holland
- Huron
- Maumee
- Northwood
- Ontario
- Oregon
- Perrysburg
- Rossford
- Sandusky
- Shelby
- St. Marys
- Sylvania
- Vermilion
- Willard

==== Villages ====
- Ada
- Alger
- Antwerp
- Arcadia
- Archbold
- Arlington
- Attica
- Bailey Lakes
- Bairdstown
- Bay View
- Beaverdam
- Bellville
- Belmore
- Benton Ridge
- Berkey
- Berlin Heights
- Bettsville
- Blakeslee
- Bloomdale
- Bloomville
- Bluffton
- Bradner
- Broughton
- Buckland
- Burgoon
- Burkettsville
- Butler
- Cairo
- Caledonia
- Cardington
- Carey
- Castalia
- Cecil
- Chatfield
- Chesterville
- Chickasaw
- Clay Center
- Cloverdale
- Coldwater
- Columbus Grove
- Continental
- Convoy
- Cridersville
- Custar
- Cygnet
- Delta
- Deshler
- Dunkirk
- Dupont
- Edgerton
- Edison
- Edon
- Elgin
- Elida
- Elmore
- Fayette
- Florida
- Forest
- Fort Jennings
- Fort Recovery
- Fort Shawnee
- Fulton
- Genoa
- Gibsonburg
- Gilboa
- Glandorf
- Grand Rapids
- Green Camp
- Green Springs
- Greenwich
- Grover Hill
- Hamler
- Harbor View
- Harpster
- Harrod
- Haskins
- Haviland
- Hayesville
- Helena
- Hicksville
- Holgate
- Holiday City
- Hoytville
- Jenera
- Jeromesville
- Jerry City
- Kalida
- Kelleys Island
- Kirby
- Lafayette
- LaRue
- Latty
- Leipsic
- Lexington
- Liberty Center
- Lindsey
- Loudonville
- Lucas
- Luckey
- Lyons
- Malinta
- Marblehead
- Marengo
- Marseilles
- McClure
- McComb
- McGuffey
- Melrose
- Mendon
- Metamora
- Middle Point
- Mifflin
- Milan
- Millbury
- Miller City
- Milton Center
- Minster
- Monroeville
- Montezuma
- Montpelier
- Morral
- Mount Blanchard
- Mount Cory
- Mount Victory
- Nevada
- New Bavaria
- New Bloomington
- New Bremen
- New Knoxville
- New London
- New Riegel
- New Washington
- Ney
- North Baltimore
- North Fairfield
- North Robinson
- Oak Harbor
- Oakwood
- Ohio City
- Ottawa
- Ottoville
- Pandora
- Patterson
- Payne
- Pemberville
- Perrysville
- Pioneer
- Plymouth
- Polk
- Portage
- Prospect
- Put-in-Bay
- Rawson
- Republic
- Ridgeway
- Risingsun
- Rockford
- Rocky Ridge
- Savannah
- Scott
- Sherwood
- Shiloh
- Sparta
- Spencerville
- St. Henry
- Stryker
- Swanton
- Sycamore
- Tiffin
- Tiro
- Tontogany
- Uniopolis
- Van Buren
- Vanlue
- Venedocia
- Wakeman
- Walbridge
- Waldo
- Waterville
- Wayne
- Waynesfield
- West Leipsic
- West Millgrove
- Weston
- West Unity
- Wharton
- Whitehouse
- Willshire
- Woodville
- Wren

==== Townships ====
- Amanda Township, Allen County
- Amanda Township, Hancock County
- American Township, Allen County
- Auglaize Township, Allen County
- Auglaize Township, Paulding County
- Bath Township, Allen County
- Bay Township, Ottawa County
- Bloom Township, Wood County
- Clear Creek Township, Ashland County
- Erie Township, Ottawa County
- Green Township, Ashland County
- Hanover Township, Ashland County
- Jackson Township, Allen County
- Jackson Township, Ashland County
- Jackson Township, Auglaize County
- Jackson Township, Crawford County
- Jackson Township, Hancock County
- Jackson Township, Hardin County
- Jackson Township, Paulding County
- Jackson Township, Putnam County
- Jackson Township, Richland County
- Jackson Township, Sandusky County
- Jackson Township, Seneca County
- Jackson Township, Van Wert County
- Jackson Township, Wood County
- Jackson Township, Wyandot County
- Lake Township, Ashland County
- Lake Township, Wood County
- Marion Township, Allen County
- Marion Township, Hancock County
- Marion Township, Hardin County
- Marion Township, Henry County
- Marion Township, Marion County
- Marion Township, Mercer County
- Mifflin Township, Ashland County
- Mifflin Township, Richland County
- Mifflin Township, Wyandot County
- Milton Township, Ashland County
- Mohican Township, Ashland County
- Monroe Township, Allen County
- Monroe Township, Henry County
- Monroe Township, Putnam County
- Monroe Township, Richland County
- Montgomery Township, Ashland County
- Orange Township, Ashland County
- Perry Township, Allen County
- Perry Township, Ashland County
- Perry Township, Morrow County
- Perry Township, Putnam County
- Perry Township, Richland County
- Portage Township, Ottawa County
- Richland Township, Allen County
- Richland Township, Defiance County
- Richland Township, Marion County
- Richland Township, Wyandot County
- Ruggles Township, Ashland County
- Shawnee Township, Allen County
- Sullivan Township, Ashland County
- Troy Township, Ashland County
- Troy Township, Richland County
- Troy Township, Wood County
- Vermillion Township, Ashland County

==== Toledo area townships ====
- Monclova Township
- Perrysburg Township
- Springfield Township
- Sylvania Township
- Washington Township

==== Other places ====
- Nankin
- Nova
- Sullivan
- Ridgeville

=== Extreme Northwest Ohio ===
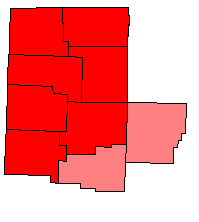
What is considered to be Extreme Northwest Ohio is shaded in red including the counties of Defiance, Fulton, Henry, Paulding, Putnam, Van Wert, and Williams. Allen and Hancock counties are sometimes included in the geographical area and are shaded in a lighter red.

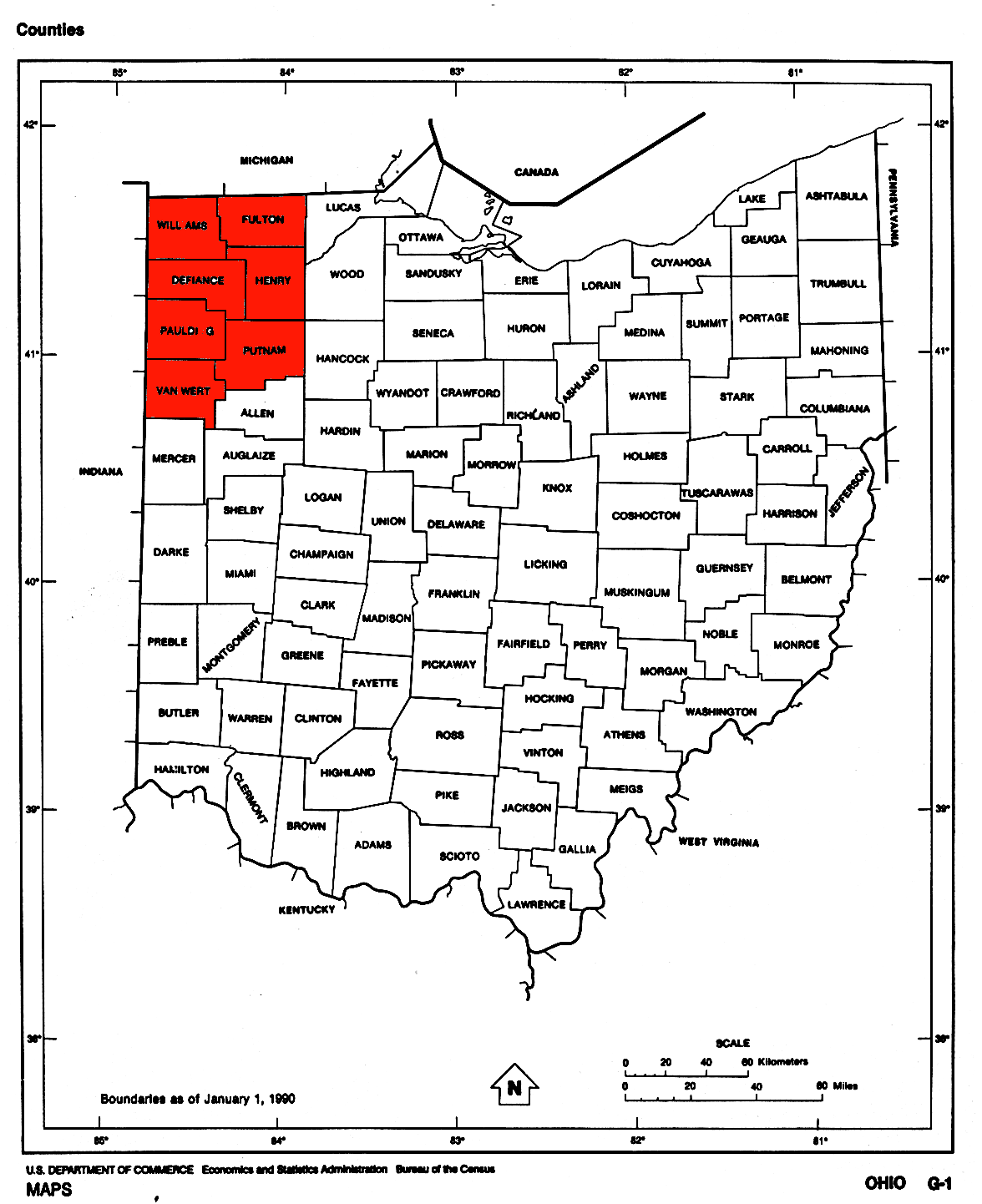
Extreme Northwest Ohio in Ohio

Extreme Northwest Ohio, or Far Northwestern Ohio, is a portion of Northwest Ohio best known as the Great Black Swamp area due to its natural history. The counties of Defiance, Fulton, Henry, Paulding, Putnam, Van Wert, and Williams in the state of Ohio are usually classified as Extreme Northwest Ohio.

According to the 2000 Census, the population of this portion of NW Ohio is 234,660. When Allen and Hancock counties are included, the population is 414,428. Just like any other region, there is no universally agreed-upon line for Northwestern Ohio, as the entire area is defined differently by the opinions of multiple people.

==== Principal Cities ====
City	Population (2010 Census)
Bryan (Williams County)	8,545
Defiance (Defiance County)	16,494
Findlay (Hancock County)	41,202
Lima (Allen County)	38,771

== Politics ==
Northwest Ohio Election Results

Northwest Ohio Presidential election results
Year	Democratic	Republican	Third parties
1996	45.04% 265,560	42.71% 251,806	12.25% 72,248
2000	42.88% 260,237	53.96% 327,477	3.17% 19,218
2004	44.03% 310,480	55.54% 391,676	0.43% 3,031
2008	49.41% 351,887	48.59% 346,062	1.99% 14,163
2012	47.81% 327,682	49.99% 342,592	2.20% 15,076
2016	36.63% 245,615	57.08% 382,711	6.29% 42,206
2020	37.58% 264,380	60.58% 426,121	1.84% 12,934
2024	36.09% 249,299	62.45% 431,361	1.45% 10,024

== Transportation ==
=== Transit ===
Local transit is available in three urban areas within Northwest Ohio. The Toledo Area Regional Transit Authority serves Toledo, the Allen County Regional Transit Authority serves Lima, and the Sandusky Transit System serves Sandusky.

=== Airports ===
Toledo Express Airport (TOL), in suburban Swanton, is the largest airport in northwest Ohio. Toledo Express is served by seven major passenger airlines, and has been named one of the five best small airports in the Midwest. Toledo Express is also a major air cargo center, serving as the international hub for BAX Global. Toledo Express has begun a $22 million renovation project; As of 2007, the airport has expanded and renovated the central gate area of its single terminal, and is seeking an airline to offer direct service to New York City.

Toledo Express also hosts the corporate flight departments of Owens-Illinois, Owens-Corning, Pilkington, and Dana Holding Corporation. Grand Aire Express offers charter and air taxi services from its base at the airport. In education, the airport is a base of operations for FlightSafety International and Toledo Public Schools' aviation program, with flight instruction also offered by the airport's two fixed-base operators, who also provide fuel, repair, and storage for general aviation aircraft. Additionally, Toledo Express is a base for F-16 fighter jets of the Ohio Air National Guard, which has provided the airport additional funding for runway lengthening and safety enhancements.

Detroit Metropolitan Airport to the north, Port Columbus International Airport to the southeast, and Cleveland Hopkins International Airport to the east are the major or hub airports serving residents of Northwest Ohio. Detroit Metro is a "fortress hub" for Delta Air Lines and offers both domestic and international flights. Cleveland Hopkins is a hub for United Airlines and offers both domestic and international flights.

Charter and air taxi service is also available at several smaller airports, such as Toledo Metcalf Field, Findlay Airport, and Lima Allen County Airport. General aviation users can also land at any one of approximately 40 public-use airports (both publicly and privately owned) in Northwest Ohio.

KFDY (Findlay Airport) has both the second and third largest runway in Northwest Ohio with runway 18/36 at 6449 x 100 ft and runway 7/25 at 5883 x 100 ft. Runway 18/36 is capable of allowing aircraft such as the Boeing 767-200 to land and then take-off at MTOW if needed. KTOL (Toledo Express) has the largest runway in Northwest Ohio at 10,600 x 150 ft, making it capable of handling nearly any aircraft at MTOW.

=== Roads ===
Interstate 90 runs east-west through the upper part of Northwest Ohio. Interstate 75 runs from the Michigan border, through Toledo, south to Findlay, Lima, and to southwest Ohio.

=== Railroads ===
Amtrak serves the passenger train, the Lake Shore Limited in Bryan in the Extreme Northwest. Martin Luther King Jr. Plaza in Toledo and Sandusky host Amtrak's Lake Shore Limited and Capitol Limited.

== Notable people ==
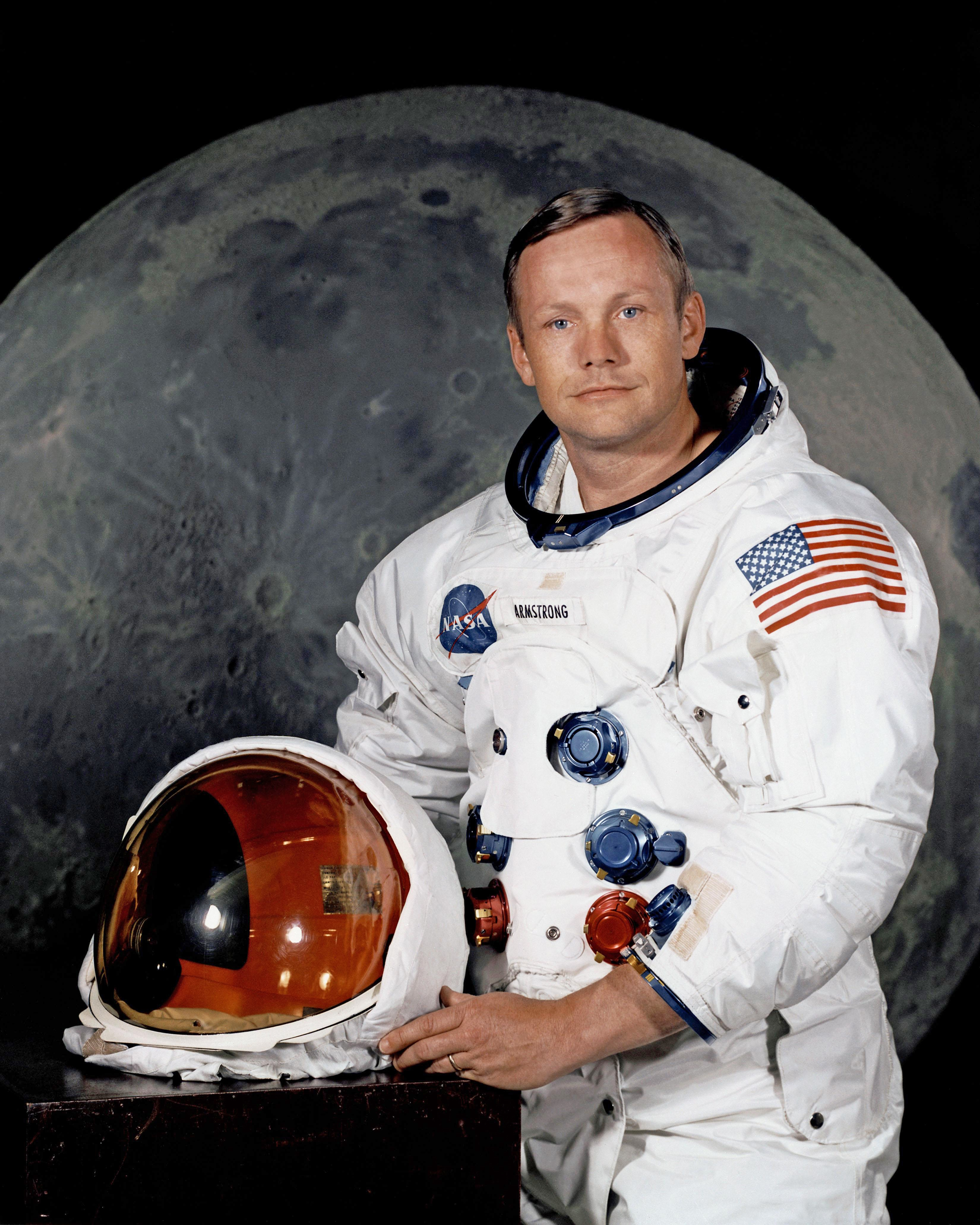
Neil Armstrong in 1969

- Neil Armstrong, the first person to walk on the Moon, was born in Wapakoneta in Auglaize County, and spent time as a child in Upper Sandusky. The Neil Armstrong Air and Space Museum is named to honor his achievements.
- Singer and Grammy winner Anita Baker was born in Toledo in Lucas County.
- Figure skater Alissa Czisny is from Bowling Green in Wood County. She won a bronze medal at the 2007 United States Figure Skating Championships in Spokane.
- Actor Jamie Farr, best known as Corporal Maxwell Klinger from the TV series M*A*S*H, is from Toledo.
- Former president Gerald Ford's wife Betty Ford lived in Toledo for a short period of time in the 1940s with her ex-husband before marrying Gerald Ford.
- Stephen Hadley, National Security Advisor to President George W. Bush, was born in Toledo and lived in Ottawa Hills, Ohio, until his family moved to the Cleveland area.
- Olympic Figure Skater Scott Hamilton is from Bowling Green in Wood County. He won a gold medal at the 1984 Olympic Games in Sarajevo, Bosnia-Herzegovina.
- Rutherford B. Hayes, 19th president of the United States, lived in Fremont, Ohio.
- Kurt Rock, Rapper and record producer born in Defiance, & from Continental
- Actress Katie Holmes is from Sylvania in Lucas County.
- 2006 Indianapolis 500 winner, 3 time Indy Car champion, and current NASCAR driver Sam Hornish Jr. was born in Bryan, grew up in Defiance, and now lives in Napoleon.
- Children's television show host Frances Horwich, also known as "Miss Frances", was born in Ottawa, Putnam County.
- American Atheists founder Madalyn Murray O'Hair graduated from Rossford High School.
- Pittsburgh Steelers' quarterback and Super Bowl champion Ben Roethlisberger was born in Lima, and raised in Findlay, in Hancock County.
- Teresa Brewer, a popular jazz and traditional pop singer, was a native of Toledo.
- Guitarist Tom Scholz of the rock band Boston is from Ottawa Hills.
- Noted feminist Gloria Steinem is from Toledo. Her grandmother, Pauline Steinem, was the first woman (and thus, the first Jewish woman) elected to the Toledo Board of Education.
- Carl Karcher, founder of Carl's Jr. Restaurants (Hardee's) was born in Upper Sandusky.
