= Lima metropolitan area, Ohio =

Metropolitan area in Ohio, United States of America

Coordinates: 40°45′N 84°15′W

Lima Metropolitan Area
- Metropolitan Statistical Area
- Lima, OH Metropolitan Statistical Area
Map of Lima–Van Wert–Celina, OH CSA
City of Lima
Lima MSA
Wapakoneta µSA
Celina µSA
Van Wert µSA

The Lima metropolitan statistical area, as defined by the United States Census Bureau, is an area consisting of one county – Allen – in Northwest Ohio, anchored by the city of Lima. As of the 2000 census, the MSA had a population of 108,473 (though a July 1, 2009 estimate placed the population at 104,357).

== History ==
The Lima metropolitan area was first defined in 1950. Then known as the Lima standard metropolitan area (Lima SMA), it consisted of a single county – Allen – and had a population of 88,183. Following a term change by the Bureau of the Budget (present-day Office of Management and Budget) in 1959, the Lima SMA became the Lima standard metropolitan statistical area (Lima SMSA). By the census of 1960, the population had grown to 103,691, an 18 percent increase over the previous census.

Two additional counties were added to the Lima SMSA in 1971 – Putnam and Van Wert. Auglaize County became a part of the SMSA in 1973. With that addition, there were a total of 218,244 residents living in the metropolitan area at the 1980 census.

In 1983, the official designation was shortened to the Lima metropolitan statistical area (Lima MSA), which is still in use to date. That same year, Putnam and Van Wert counties were removed from the MSA, leaving only Allen and Auglaize counties in the defined area. The two-county Lima MSA had a population of 154,340 in 1990. That figure had risen to 155,084 by 2000.

In 2003, Auglaize County was removed from the Lima metropolitan area and was re-designated as the Wapakoneta micropolitan statistical area (Wapakoneta μSA).

== Communities ==
=== Cities ===
- Delphos (partial)
- Lima (Principal city)

=== Villages ===
- Beaverdam
- Bluffton (partial)
- Cairo
- Elida
- Fort Shawnee
- Harrod
- Lafayette
- Spencerville

=== Unincorporated communities ===
- Gomer
- Westminster

== Townships ==
- Amanda
- American
- Auglaize
- Bath
- Jackson
- Marion
- Monroe
- Perry
- Richland
- Shawnee
- Spencer
- Sugar Creek

== Combined Statistical Area ==
The Lima–Van Wert–Celina, OH Combined Statistical Area is made up of three counties in northwest Ohio. The statistical area includes one metropolitan area and two micropolitan areas. As of the 2010 Census, the CSA had a population of 221,838.

- Metropolitan Statistical Areas (MSAs)
  - Lima (Allen County)
- Micropolitan Statistical Areas (μSAs)
  - Van Wert (Van Wert County)
  - Celina (Mercer County)
  - Wapakoneta (Auglaize County)

== See also ==
- Ohio census statistical areas
