= West Newton =

West Newton is the name of various locations:

== England ==
- West Newton, East Riding of Yorkshire
- West Newton, Norfolk
- West Newton, Somerset, in the Hundred of North Petherton

== United States ==
- West Newton, Indiana
- West Newton, Massachusetts
  - West Newton (MBTA station)
- West Newton, Minnesota, ghost town
- West Newton, Wabasha County, Minnesota, unincorporated community
- West Newton, Ohio
- West Newton, Pennsylvania
- West Newton Township, Nicollet County, Minnesota

== See also ==
- Westnewton (disambiguation)
