= Kemp, Ohio =

Unincorporated community in Ohio, U.S.

Coordinates: 40°43′25″N 84°13′24″W

Kemp is an unincorporated community in Allen County, in the U.S. state of Ohio.

== History ==
A variant name was Kempton. Kemp originally was the name of the community's railroad station. A post office called Kempton was established in 1882, and remained in operation until 1931.
