= Southworth, Ohio =

Unincorporated community in Ohio, U.S.

Coordinates: 40°45′50″N 84°20′24″W

Southworth is an unincorporated community in Allen County, in the U.S. state of Ohio.

== History ==
A post office called Southworth was established in 1879, and remained in operation until 1910. The community was named for Benjamin F. Southworth, the original owner of the site.
