= Scotts Crossing, Ohio =

Unincorporated community in Ohio, U.S.

Coordinates: 40°49′04″N 84°16′22″W

Scotts Crossing is an unincorporated community in Allen County, in the U.S. state of Ohio.

== History ==
A post office called Scotts Crossing was established in 1873, and remained in operation until 1909. Besides the post office, Scotts Crossing had a country store.
