= Landeck, Ohio =

Unincorporated community in Ohio, U.S.

Coordinates: 40°48′04″N 84°23′17″W

- Unincorporated community
- Interactive map of Landeck, Ohio
- Country: United States
- State: Ohio
- County: Allen
- Township: Marion
- Time zone: UTC-5 (Eastern Standard)
  - Summer (DST): UTC-4 (Eastern Daylight)
- ZIP code: 45833
- Area code(s): 419 and 567

Landeck is an unincorporated community in Allen County, in the U.S. state of Ohio.

== History ==
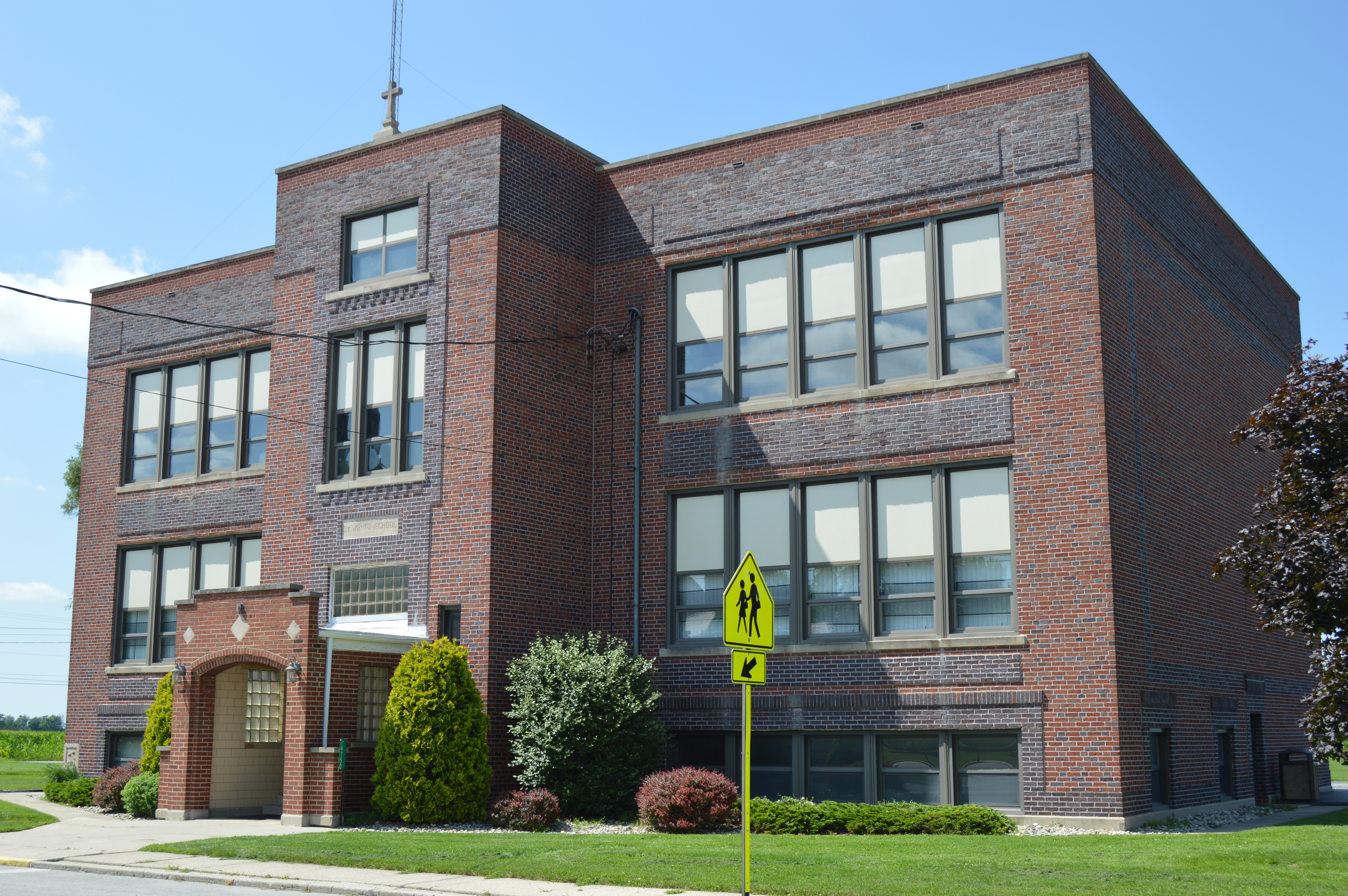
Former school

Landeck was built up around a Catholic church founded in the 1860s. A post office called Landeck was established in 1871 and remained in operation until 1907. The former school, pictured above, was a part of the Delphos City Schools School District.

Landeck is still centered around St. John the Baptist Catholic Church. The Church is a part of the Diocese of Toledo. The other major staple is the Landeck Tavern, known for its chicken.
