= Gomer, Ohio =

Unincorporated community in Ohio, U.S.

Coordinates: 40°50′45″N 84°10′52″W

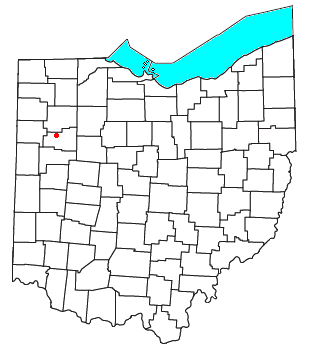
Location of Gomer, Ohio

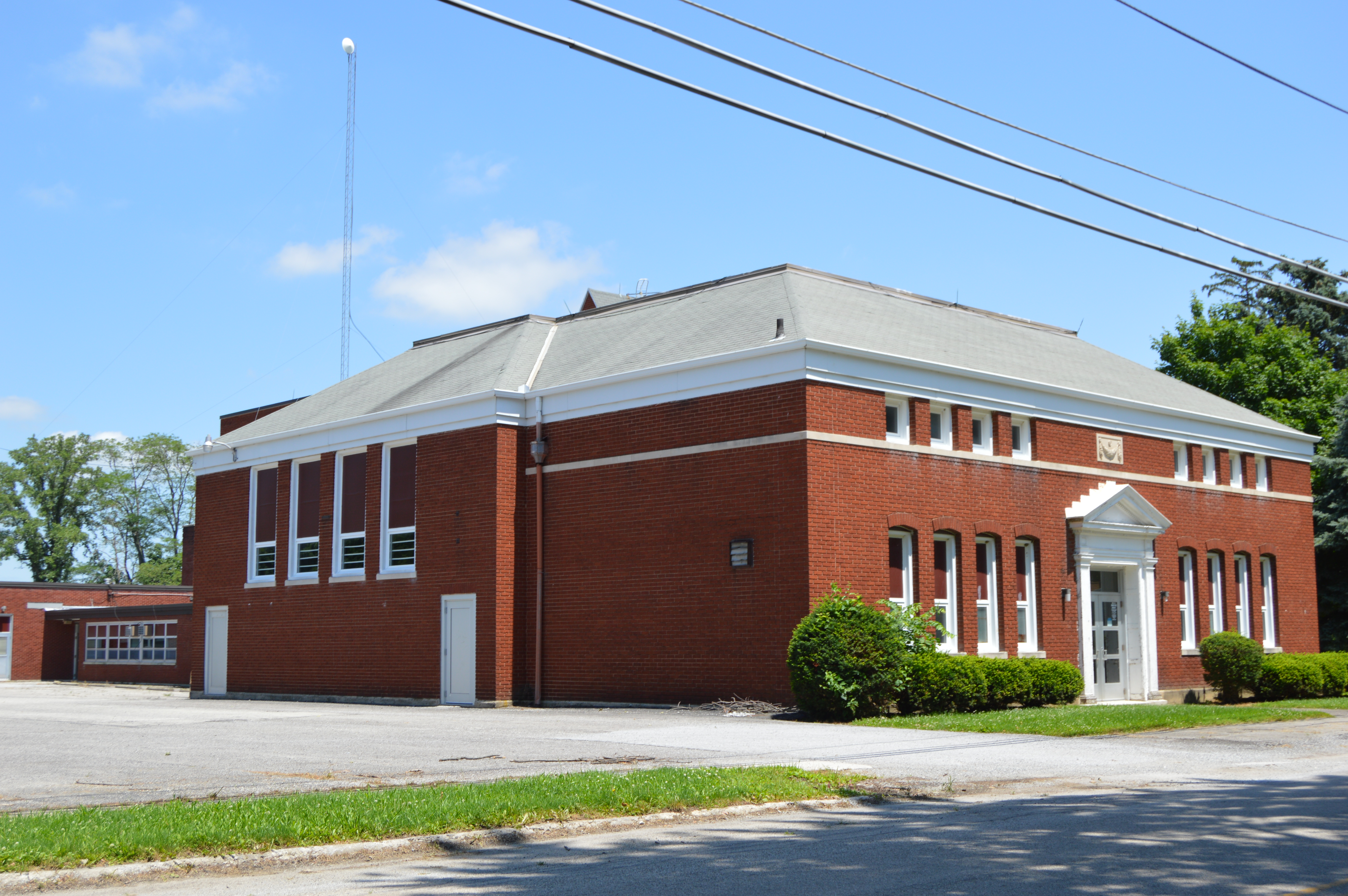
Former high school

Gomer is an unincorporated community in northern Sugar Creek Township, Allen County, Ohio, United States. As of the 2020 census, Gomer had a population of 345. Founded in 1833 by three Welshmen, Gomer was a hub of the Welsh community in America for decades. It has a post office with the ZIP code 45809. It lies at the intersection of Gomer Road with the Old Lincoln Highway less than one mile north of U.S. Route 30. The community is part of the Lima Metropolitan Statistical Area. Gomer is part of the Elida Local School District.

== History ==
Gomer was laid out in 1850. A post office called Gomer was established in 1854, and remained in operation until 1961.

On October 28, 1939, Admiral Richard E. Byrd's Antarctic Snow Cruiser drove off of a small bridge on the Lincoln highway and into a stream. The accident was caused by a damaged steering system. Over the next 3 days, 125,000 people came to see the crash site.
