= Allen County, Ohio =

County in Ohio, United States

- County
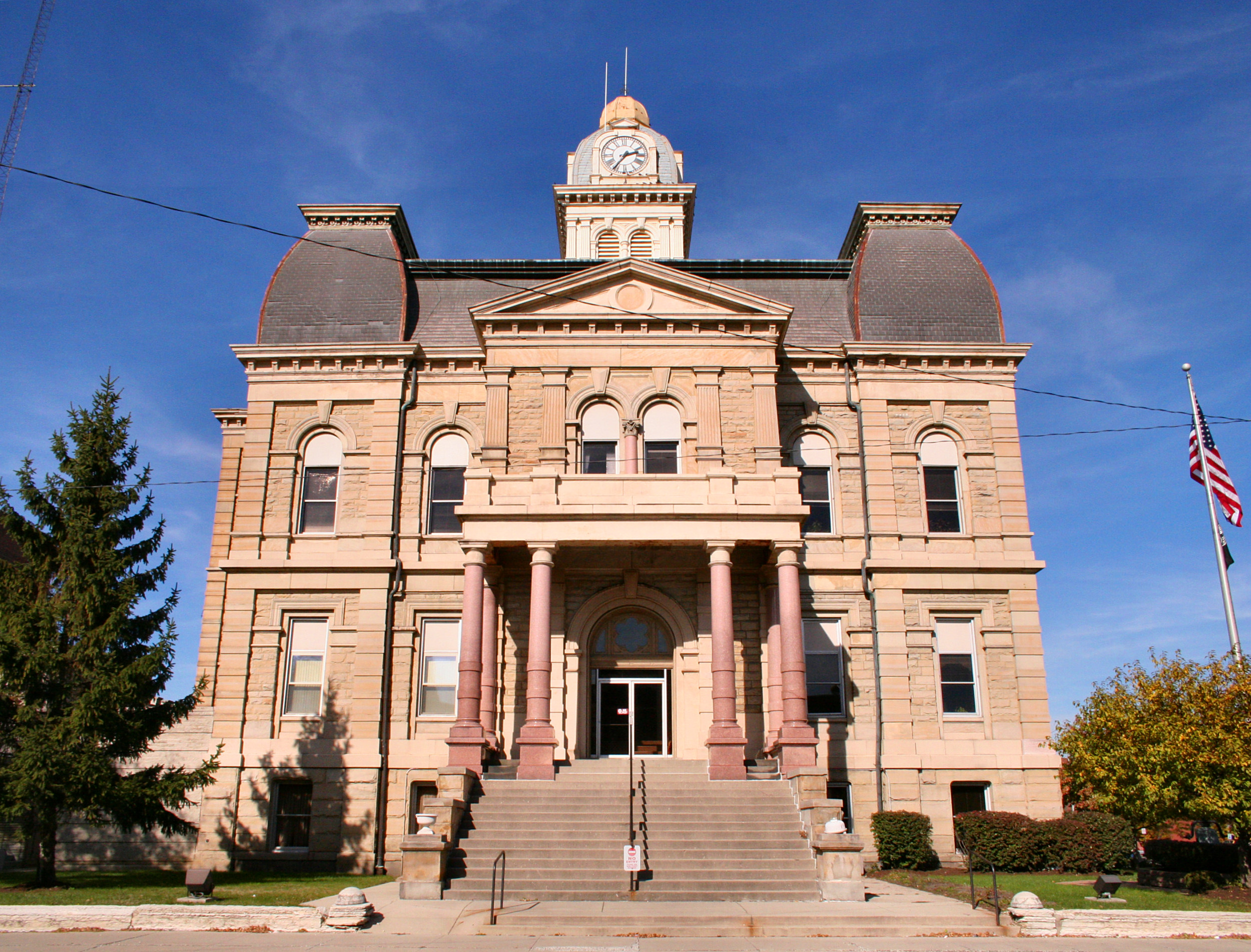
- Allen County Courthouse in Lima

- Flag Seal

- Location within the U.S. state of Ohio
- Coordinates: 40°46′N 84°07′W
- Country: United States
- State: Ohio
- Founded: March 1, 1831
- Named for: John Allen
- Seat: Lima
- Largest city: Lima

Area
  - Total: 407 sq mi (1,050 km^{2})
  - Land: 402 sq mi (1,040 km^{2})
  - Water: 4.4 sq mi (11 km^{2}) 1.1%

Population (2020)
  - Total: 102,206
  - Estimate (2025): 100,881 ▼
  - Density: 250/sq mi (97/km^{2})
- Time zone: UTC−5 (Eastern)
  - Summer (DST): UTC−4 (EDT)
- Congressional district: 4th
- Website: allencountyohio.com

Allen County is a county located in the northwestern part of the U.S. state of Ohio. Its county seat and largest city is Lima. The county was created in 1820 and organized in 1831. The county is named in honor of Colonel John Allen, who was killed leading his men at the Battle of Frenchtown during the War of 1812. (Note: It has been claimed the county was named for Revolutionary War soldier Ethan Allen, but the weight of the evidence in favor of John Allen led the General Assembly to declare in 1976 that the county was named for him.)

Allen County comprises the Lima metropolitan statistical area, and as of the 2020 census, the population was 102,206. Allen County also comprises the entirety of the Lima, OH media market.

== History ==
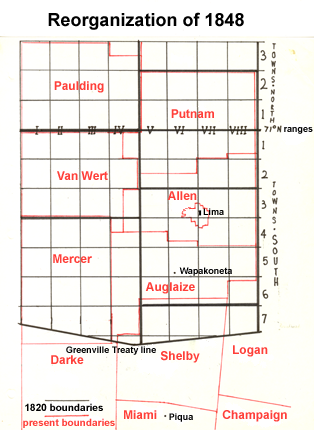

Under the terms of the Treaty of Greenville signed in 1795, northwestern Ohio was reserved for Native Americans. Thus the area now comprising Allen County was off-limits to European settlement until the Treaty of Maumee Rapids in 1817. Under the terms of this treaty, the Shawnee tribe was assigned reservations at Wapakonetta and at their "Hog Creek" settlement along the Ottawa River which comprised most of what is the present-day Shawnee Township. The latter treaty opened the way for the Ohio Legislature on March 1, 1820, to create fourteen counties, including Allen, which was defined as Ranges 5 through 8 east and Towns 3 through 6 south.

The first permanent settlement within Allen County's present day bounds took place in 1824, when Christopher S. Wood and his family settled in section 7 of Bath Township. The organization of Bath Township predates that of Allen County, with its first township meeting held on March 2, 1829. On February 12, 1829, an act of the legislature set aside land for a "county town". Wood was appointed commissioner to determine the location of this "seat of justice" for Allen County. This was done on March 3, 1831, with Wood appointed as Town Director. He laid out plots of land to be sold in section 31 of Bath Township, and the plat was filed April 20, 1831, creating what was the beginning of the city of Lima.

Allen County organization's dates from the first meeting of the county commissioners, held on June 6, 1831. Present at this meeting were Commissioners James Daniels, John G. Wood, and Samuel Stewart. Also present was William G. Wood, county auditor; Adam White, county treasurer; and Henry Lippincott, sheriff.

The first court of justice was held in August 1831, and it is believed the assembly of men, in informal session, selected the name for the seat of justice by drawing names from a hat. The meeting was held at the cabin of James Daniels, which was on the bank of the Ottawa River near the current location of Market Street. Patrick G. Goode of Montgomery County, special prosecuting attorney at that session, is given credit for having offered up the name of "Lima" (capital of Peru and source of the quinine used to treat the malaria prevalent in the area of the Great Black Swamp). At the County Commission session on June 6, 1831, the formation of a second township, Jackson, was approved.

In 1832 the Shawnees, including those living in the Hog Creek reservation (present day Shawnee Township), were removed to eastern Kansas. They received payment of $30 000 in fifteen annual installments for their lands which had an estimated value of over $200 000 at that time. They arrived at their new home with few provisions and immediately suffered an epidemic of cholera.

Lima was established as a village in 1841, and the town of Lima was organized March 29, 1842. Henry DeVilliers Williams was elected the first mayor and Amos Clutter was elected the first town marshal.

In 1848, Allen County's boundaries changed with a reorganization that created Auglaize County, Ohio, from the southern half of the original county. Town 2S, Range 7E (Monroe Twp.); Town 2S, Range 8E (Richland Twp.); the southern half of Town 2S, Range 5E, and the southern half of Town 2S, Range 6E (Sugar Creek Twp.) were transferred from Putnam County to Allen County. Parts of Van Wert and Mercer Counties were also transferred to Allen to form Spencer Township and part of Marion Township. In May 1853, Allen and Putnam Counties agreed on a cash settlement for Putnam's loss.

There were several practical implications of these changes to the boundaries of Allen County. Lima, the county seat, became near the county's center, rather than in the northern quarter. The county's western part gained a significant stretch of the Miami and Erie Canal, which was completed in 1845. The reorganization also brought the towns of Spencerville, laid out in 1844 on the canal, and Bluffton within the bounds of the county.

In 1885, oil was discovered in Lima. This began a boom in Allen County which lasted until after 1910.

=== Allen County Fair ===
One of Allen County's notable annual events is its County Fair. Run every August in Lima since 1851, the Fair is among Western Ohio's foremost agricultural showcasing events. In 2005, there were over 220,000 visitors and almost 3,000 exhibitors, making it the largest in the state.

The fair attracted many nationally known performers during the 1980s and 1990s, and combined with significant renovations to the county show grounds, these factors led to a marked increase in attendance and notoriety over the past two decades.

== Geography ==
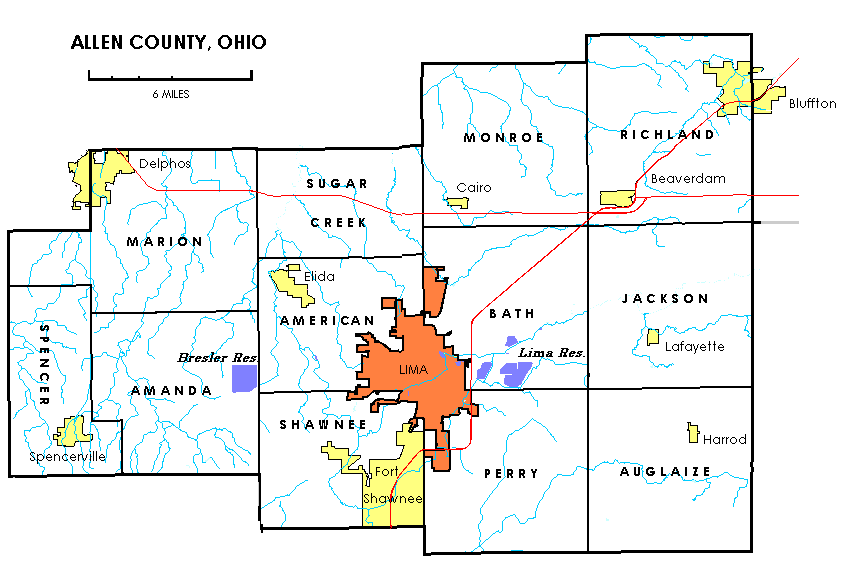
Allen County townships.

According to the U.S. Census Bureau, the county has a total area of 407 square miles (1,050 km^{2}), of which 402 square miles (1,040 km^{2}) is land and 4.4 square miles (11 km^{2}) (1.1%) is water.

=== Adjacent counties ===
- Putnam County (north)
- Hancock County (northeast)
- Hardin County (east)
- Auglaize County (south)
- Van Wert County (west)

== Demographics ==
Historical population
Census	Pop.	Note	%±
1830	578		—
1840	9,079		1,470.8%
1850	12,109		33.4%
1860	19,185		58.4%
1870	23,623		23.1%
1880	31,314		32.6%
1890	40,644		29.8%
1900	47,976		18.0%
1910	56,580		17.9%
1920	68,223		20.6%
1930	69,419		1.8%
1940	73,303		5.6%
1950	88,183		20.3%
1960	103,691		17.6%
1970	111,144		7.2%
1980	112,241		1.0%
1990	109,755		−2.2%
2000	108,743		−0.9%
2010	106,331		−2.2%
2020	102,206		−3.9%
2025 (est.)	100,881	▼	−1.3%
U.S. Decennial Census; 1790-1960 1900-1990; 1990-2000 2020

=== Racial and ethnic composition ===
Allen County, Ohio – Racial and ethnic composition Note: the US Census treats Hispanic/Latino as an ethnic category. This table excludes Latinos from the racial categories and assigns them to a separate category. Hispanics/Latinos may be of any race.
Race / Ethnicity (NH = Non-Hispanic)	Pop 1980	Pop 1990	Pop 2000	Pop 2010	Pop 2020	% 1980	% 1990	% 2000	% 2010	% 2020
White alone (NH)	99,772	95,442	91,356	87,708	79,691	88.89%	86.96%	84.22%	82.49%	77.97%
Black or African American alone (NH)	10,878	12,236	13,130	12,508	12,475	9.69%	11.15%	12.10%	11.76%	12.21%
Native American or Alaska Native alone (NH)	135	180	206	162	233	0.12%	0.16%	0.19%	0.15%	0.23%
Asian alone (NH)	376	546	594	725	835	0.33%	0.50%	0.55%	0.68%	0.82%
Native Hawaiian or Pacific Islander alone (NH)	x	x	12	13	42	x	x	0.01%	0.01%	0.04%
Other race alone (NH)	152	111	207	271	541	0.14%	0.10%	0.19%	0.25%	0.53%
Mixed race or Multiracial (NH)	x	x	1,423	2,431	5,117	x	x	1.31%	2.29%	5.01%
Hispanic or Latino (any race)	928	1,240	1,545	2,513	3,272	0.83%	1.13%	1.42%	2.36%	3.20%
Total	112,241	109,755	108,473	106,331	102,206	100.00%	100.00%	100.00%	100.00%	100.00%

=== 2020 census ===
As of the 2020 census, the county had a population of 102,206. The median age was 40.2 years. 23.3% of residents were under the age of 18 and 18.9% of residents were 65 years of age or older. For every 100 females there were 100.4 males, and for every 100 females age 18 and over there were 98.5 males age 18 and over.

The racial makeup of the county was 79.0% White, 12.3% Black or African American, 0.3% American Indian and Alaska Native, 0.8% Asian, 0.1% Native Hawaiian and Pacific Islander, 1.4% from some other race, and 6.1% from two or more races. Hispanic or Latino residents of any race comprised 3.2% of the population.

69.0% of residents lived in urban areas, while 31.0% lived in rural areas.

There were 40,935 households in the county, of which 28.9% had children under the age of 18 living in them. Of all households, 43.8% were married-couple households, 19.8% were households with a male householder and no spouse or partner present, and 28.8% were households with a female householder and no spouse or partner present. About 30.3% of all households were made up of individuals and 13.0% had someone living alone who was 65 years of age or older.

There were 44,563 housing units, of which 8.1% were vacant. Among occupied housing units, 66.9% were owner-occupied and 33.1% were renter-occupied. The homeowner vacancy rate was 1.4% and the rental vacancy rate was 8.4%.

=== 2010 census ===
As of the 2010 United States census, there were 106,331 people, 40,619 households, and 26,982 families living in the county. The population density was 264.2 inhabitants per square mile (102.0/km^{2}). There were 44,999 housing units at an average density of 111.8 units per square mile (43.2 units/km^{2}). The racial makeup of the county was 83.8% white, 11.9% black or African American, 0.7% Asian, 0.2% American Indian, 0.8% from other races, and 2.6% from two or more races. Those of Hispanic or Latino origin made up 2.4% of the population. In terms of ancestry, 34.7% were German, 12.6% were Irish, 9.7% were American, and 7.1% were English.

Of the 40,619 households, 31.7% had children under the age of 18 living with them, 48.0% were married couples living together, 13.8% had a female householder with no husband present, 33.6% were non-families, and 27.8% of all households were made up of individuals. The average household size was 2.47 and the average family size was 3.01. The median age was 38.3 years.

The median income for a household in the county was $43,632 and the median income for a family was $55,549. Males had a median income of $43,277 versus $31,148 for females. The per capita income for the county was $21,713. About 12.0% of families and 16.3% of the population were below the poverty line, including 25.1% of those under age 18 and 6.8% of those age 65 or over.

=== 2000 census ===
As of the census of 2000, there were 108,473 people, 40,646 households, and 28,208 families living in the county. The population density was 268 inhabitants per square mile (103/km^{2}). There were 44,245 housing units at an average density of 109 units per square mile (42/km^{2}). The racial makeup of the county was 84.95% White, 12.19% Black or African American, 0.21% Native American, 0.55% Asian, 0.01% Pacific Islander, 0.63% from other races, and 1.45% from two or more races. 1.42% of the population were Hispanic or Latino of any race. 33.8% were of German, 14.2% American, 8.8% Irish, and 6.6% English ancestry according to Census 2000.

There were 40,646 households, out of which 32.90% had children under the age of 18 living with them, 53.00% were married couples living together, 12.40% had a female householder with no husband present, and 30.60% were non-families. 26.30% of all households were made up of individuals, and 11.20% had someone living alone who was 65 years of age or older. The average household size was 2.52 and the average family size was 3.05.

In the county, the population was spread out, with 25.90% under the age of 18, 9.90% from 18 to 24, 27.60% from 25 to 44, 22.40% from 45 to 64, and 14.20% who were 65 years of age or older. The median age was 36 years. For every 100 females there were 100.00 males. For every 100 females age 18 and over, there were 98.00 males.

The median income for a household in the county was $37,048, and the median income for a family was $44,723. Males had a median income of $35,546 versus $23,537 for females. The per capita income for the county was $17,511. About 9.60% of families and 12.10% of the population were below the poverty line, including 17.00% of those under age 18 and 9.60% of those age 65 or over.

== Politics ==
Although strongly Democratic up to World War I, when the only Democrat to lose the county was Alton B. Parker in 1904, Allen County has since become a very solid Republican county. Along with Delaware, Fulton, Hancock and Union, it was one of five Ohio counties to remain loyal to Barry Goldwater in 1964, and the last Democrat to carry the county was Franklin Roosevelt in his 1936 landslide.

United States presidential election results for Allen County, Ohio
Year	Republican		Democratic		Third party(ies)	
Year	No.	%	No.	%	No.	%
1856	1,415	46.90%	1,508	49.98%	94	3.12%
1860	1,796	48.18%	1,882	50.48%	50	1.34%
1864	1,882	45.61%	2,244	54.39%	0	0.00%
1868	1,892	42.15%	2,597	57.85%	0	0.00%
1872	2,010	44.61%	2,463	54.66%	33	0.73%
1876	2,481	41.23%	3,518	58.47%	18	0.30%
1880	2,906	42.44%	3,890	56.81%	51	0.74%
1884	3,372	42.67%	4,442	56.21%	89	1.13%
1888	3,761	41.07%	5,123	55.94%	274	2.99%
1892	3,579	38.55%	4,945	53.26%	761	8.20%
1896	4,959	43.01%	6,394	55.46%	176	1.53%
1900	5,281	43.94%	6,540	54.42%	197	1.64%
1904	6,091	52.50%	4,980	42.92%	532	4.59%
1908	5,841	43.08%	7,195	53.07%	521	3.84%
1912	2,638	22.33%	5,696	48.21%	3,481	29.46%
1916	5,713	40.40%	7,905	55.91%	522	3.69%
1920	13,978	53.59%	11,658	44.70%	446	1.71%
1924	15,711	61.76%	7,378	29.00%	2,348	9.23%
1928	20,693	68.21%	9,462	31.19%	182	0.60%
1932	14,678	45.97%	16,676	52.23%	576	1.80%
1936	15,079	44.89%	16,500	49.12%	2,013	5.99%
1940	20,675	58.83%	14,469	41.17%	0	0.00%
1944	21,024	62.59%	12,564	37.41%	0	0.00%
1948	17,380	56.67%	13,161	42.91%	127	0.41%
1952	26,396	65.12%	14,139	34.88%	0	0.00%
1956	28,388	70.22%	12,042	29.78%	0	0.00%
1960	28,007	65.54%	14,725	34.46%	0	0.00%
1964	19,897	51.17%	18,990	48.83%	0	0.00%
1968	23,124	60.30%	10,994	28.67%	4,231	11.03%
1972	26,966	69.96%	10,184	26.42%	1,393	3.61%
1976	23,721	60.56%	14,627	37.35%	819	2.09%
1980	29,070	65.84%	13,140	29.76%	1,944	4.40%
1984	33,506	72.98%	12,176	26.52%	229	0.50%
1988	31,021	68.97%	13,727	30.52%	227	0.50%
1992	25,322	53.48%	13,777	29.10%	8,251	17.43%
1996	24,325	55.35%	15,529	35.33%	4,094	9.32%
2000	28,647	65.41%	13,996	31.96%	1,152	2.63%
2004	32,580	66.14%	16,470	33.44%	206	0.42%
2008	29,940	59.29%	19,522	38.66%	1,033	2.05%
2012	29,502	61.03%	17,914	37.06%	925	1.91%
2016	30,487	65.94%	13,294	28.75%	2,453	5.31%
2020	33,116	68.85%	14,149	29.42%	834	1.73%
2024	33,201	71.28%	12,754	27.38%	621	1.33%

United States Senate election results for Allen County, Ohio1
Year	Republican		Democratic		Third party(ies)	
Year	No.	%	No.	%	No.	%
2024	30,208	65.69%	14,120	30.70%	1,660	3.61%

== Transportation ==
The Lima Allen County Airport is located five nautical miles (5.8 mi; 9.3 km) southeast of Lima's central business district.

== Communities ==
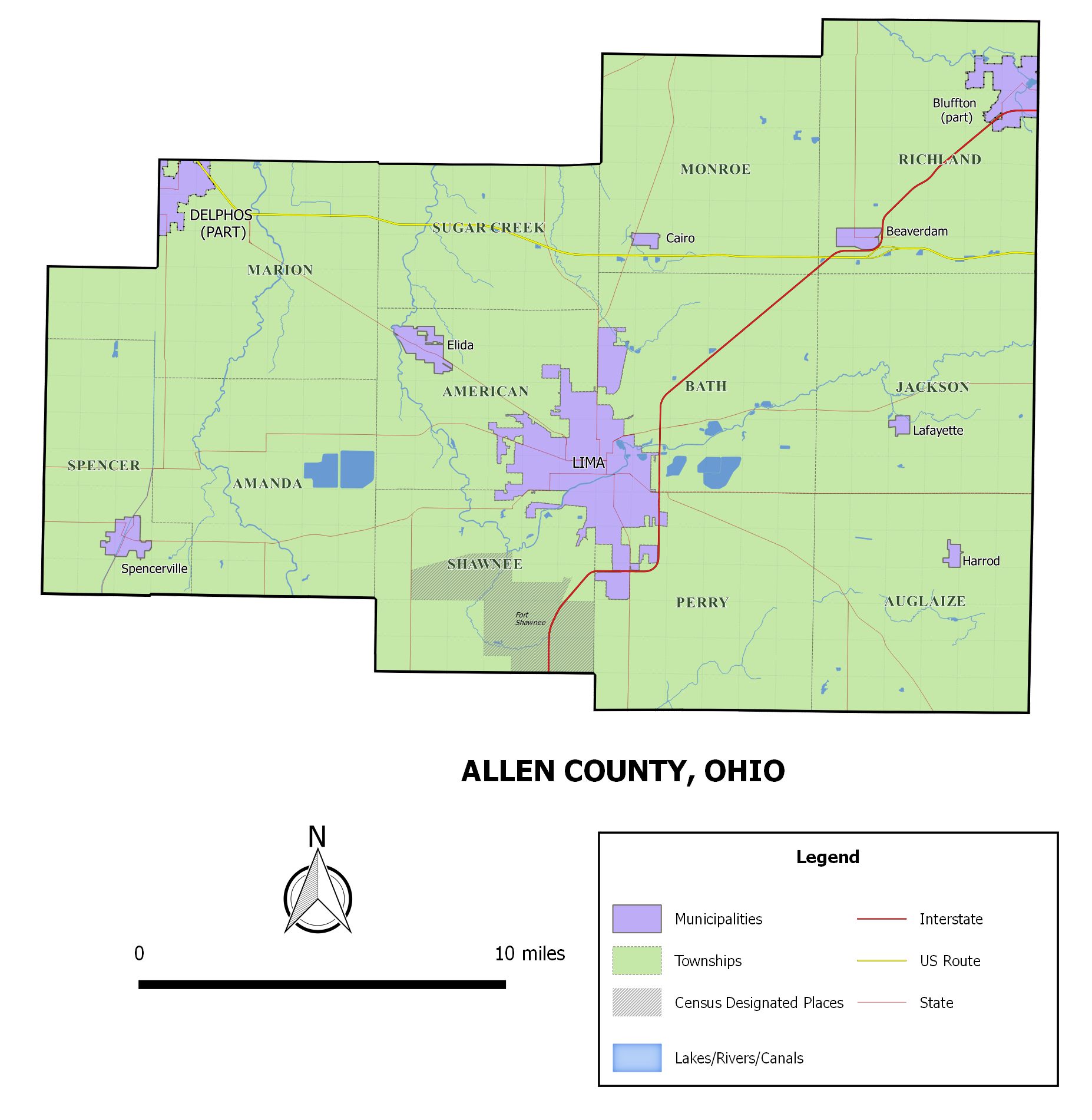
Municipalities and townships of Allen County

=== Cities ===
- Delphos (part)
- Lima (county seat)

=== Villages ===
- Beaverdam
- Bluffton (part)
- Cairo
- Elida
- Harrod
- Lafayette
- Spencerville

=== Townships ===
- Amanda
- American
- Auglaize
- Bath
- Jackson
- Marion
- Monroe
- Perry
- Richland
- Shawnee
- Spencer
- Sugar Creek

=== Census-designated places ===
- Fort Shawnee
- Gomer
- Westminster

=== Other unincorporated communities ===
- Allentown
- Conant
- Hume
- Joliet
- Kemp
- Landeck
- Maysville
- Needmore
- Oakview
- Rockport
- Rousculp
- Scotts Crossing
- Slabtown
- South Warsaw
- Southworth
- West Newton
- Yoder

== See also ==
- Allen County Regional Transportation Authority
- National Register of Historic Places listings in Allen County, Ohio
- List of counties in Ohio
