= Allentown, Ohio =

Unincorporated community in Ohio, U.S.

Coordinates: 40°45′21″N 84°11′36″W

Allentown is an unincorporated community in Allen County, in the U.S. state of Ohio.

== History ==
Allentown was platted in 1835. A post office called Allentown was established in 1848, and remained in operation until 1904.
