= South Warsaw, Ohio =

Unincorporated community in Ohio, U.S.

Coordinates: 40°39′30″N 84°01′57″W

South Warsaw is an unincorporated community in Allen County, in the U.S. state of Ohio.

== History ==
A post office called South Warsaw was established in 1856, and remained in operation until 1904. The original plat contained nine blocks.
