= Westminster, Ohio =

Unincorporated community in Ohio, U.S.

Coordinates: 40°41′56″N 83°58′46″W

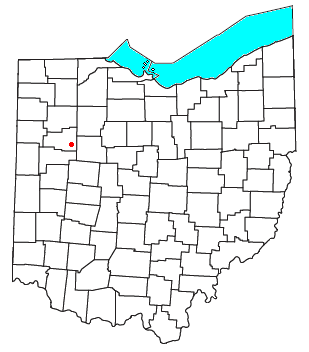
Location of Westminster, Ohio

Westminster is an unincorporated community in western Auglaize Township, Allen County, Ohio, United States. It lies along State Route 117 just north of its intersection with State Route 196, 6.5 miles (10.5 km) north of Waynesfield and 7.5 miles (12.1 km) southeast of the downtown part of the city of Lima, the county seat of Allen County. The upper reaches of the Auglaize River flow past the community. As of the 2020 census, Westminster had a population of 406.

Westminster is part of the Lima Metropolitan Statistical Area.

Westminster is the home of Rudolph Foods, a large producer of pork rinds.

== History ==
Westminster was platted in 1834. A post office called Westminster was established in 1837, and remained in operation until 1944.
