= Rockport, Ohio =

Unincorporated community in Ohio, U.S.

Coordinates: 40°52′20″N 84°0′0″W

Rockport is an unincorporated community in Allen County, in the U.S. state of Ohio.

== History ==
Rockport was platted in 1836. The post office at Rockport was called Cranberry. This post office was established in 1849, and remained in operation until 1901.
