= Westnewton =

Westnewton may refer to:

- Westnewton, Cumbria, England
- Westnewton, Northumberland, England

== See also ==
- West Newton (disambiguation)
