= Hume, Ohio =

Unincorporated community in Ohio, U.S.

Coordinates: 40°39′47″N 84°12′03″W

Hume is an unincorporated community in Allen County, in the U.S. state of Ohio.

== History ==
Hume had its start when the railroad was extended to that point. A post office called Hume was established in 1875, and remained in operation until 1960.
