= Fort Shawnee, Ohio =

- CDP
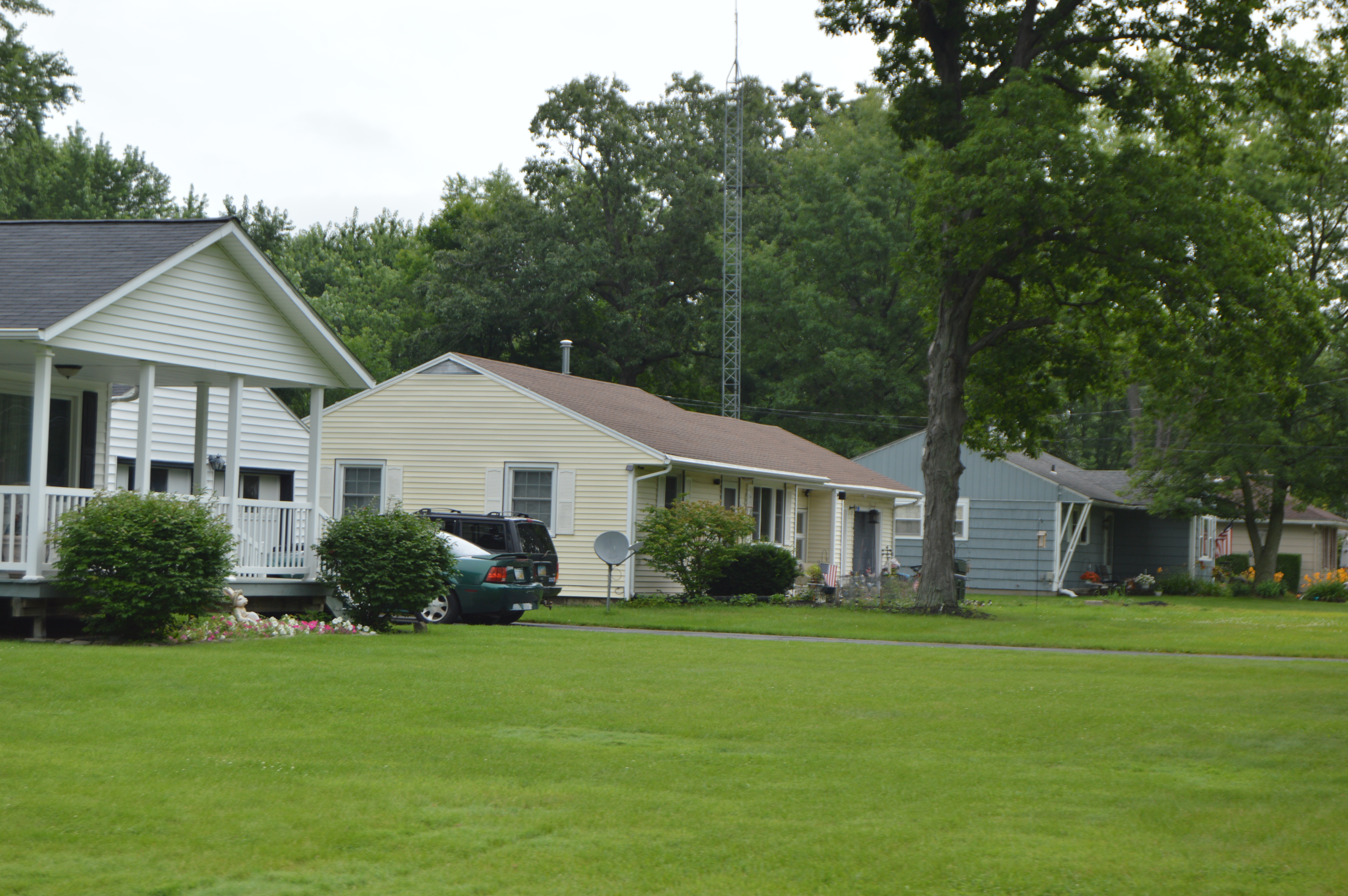
- Houses on Frail Road

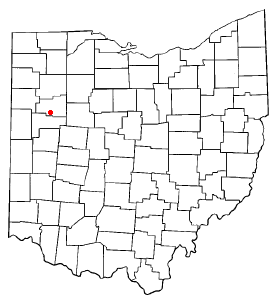
- Location of Fort Shawnee, Ohio
- Coordinates: 40°40′43″N 84°08′21″W
- Country: United States
- State: Ohio
- County: Allen
- Township: Shawnee

Government
  - Mayor: Dennis E. Shaffer

Area
  - Total: 9.58 sq mi (24.81 km^{2})
  - Land: 9.51 sq mi (24.63 km^{2})
  - Water: 0.069 sq mi (0.18 km^{2})
- Elevation: 863 ft (263 m)

Population (2020)
  - Total: 6,263
  - Density: 658.6/sq mi (254.29/km^{2})
- Time zone: UTC-5 (Eastern (EST))
  - Summer (DST): UTC-4 (EDT)
- FIPS code: 39-27944
- GNIS feature ID: 2745893

Fort Shawnee is census-designated place (CDP) in Allen County, Ohio, United States. The population was 6,263 at the 2020 census. It is included in the Lima, Ohio Metropolitan Statistical Area. Fort Shawnee is adjacent to the city of Lima and the village of Cridersville in Auglaize County. In 2012, village residents voted to disincorporate the village. According to the United States Census Bureau, the village had a total area of 7.25 square miles (18.78 km^{2}), of which 7.21 square miles (18.67 km^{2}) is land and 0.04 square miles (0.10 km^{2}) is water.

== Demographics ==
Historical population
Census	Pop.	Note	%±
2020	6,263		—
U.S. Decennial Census

=== 2010 census ===
As of the census of 2010, there were 3,726 people, 1,506 households, and 1,095 families living in the village. The population density was 516.8 inhabitants per square mile (199.5/km^{2}). There were 1,605 housing units at an average density of 222.6 per square mile (85.9/km^{2}). The racial makeup of the village was 94.6% White, 2.5% African American, 0.2% Native American, 0.4% Asian, 0.1% Pacific Islander, 1.0% from other races, and 1.2% from two or more races. Hispanic or Latino of any race were 1.9% of the population.

There were 1,506 households, of which 31.3% had children under the age of 18 living with them, 55.4% were married couples living together, 11.7% had a female householder with no husband present, 5.6% had a male householder with no wife present, and 27.3% were non-families. 22.4% of all households were made up of individuals, and 9.1% had someone living alone who was 65 years of age or older. The average household size was 2.47 and the average family size was 2.87.

The median age in the village was 42 years. 23.3% of residents were under the age of 18; 8.2% were between the ages of 18 and 24; 22.5% were from 25 to 44; 30.2% were from 45 to 64; and 15.8% were 65 years of age or older. The gender makeup of the village was 50.1% male and 49.9% female.

=== 2000 census ===
As of the census of 2000, there were 3,855 people, 1,524 households, and 1,141 families living in the village. The population density was 535.0 inhabitants per square mile (206.6/km^{2}). There were 1,608 housing units at an average density of 223.2 per square mile (86.2/km^{2}). The racial makeup of the village was 94.37% White, 3.06% African American, 0.08% Native American, 0.62% Asian, 0.03% Pacific Islander, 0.99% from other races, and 0.86% from two or more races. Hispanic or Latino of any race were 1.40% of the population.

There were 1,524 households, out of which 32.6% had children under the age of 18 living with them, 62.3% were married couples living together, 9.4% had a female householder with no husband present, and 25.1% were non-families. 21.3% of all households were made up of individuals, and 7.7% had someone living alone who was 65 years of age or older. The average household size was 2.53 and the average family size was 2.92.

In the village the population was spread out, with 24.9% under the age of 18, 7.7% from 18 to 24, 27.0% from 25 to 44, 26.8% from 45 to 64, and 13.6% who were 65 years of age or older. The median age was 39 years. For every 100 females, there were 96.4 males. For every 100 females age 18 and over, there were 94.4 males.

The median income for a household in the village was $46,723, and the median income for a family was $52,072. Males had a median income of $41,908 versus $25,438 for females. The per capita income for the village was $19,916. About 2.4% of families and 2.7% of the population were below the poverty line, including 0.6% of those under age 18 and 4.7% of those age 65 or over.
