= American Township, Ohio =

Township in Ohio, US

American Township, Allen County, Ohio
- Township
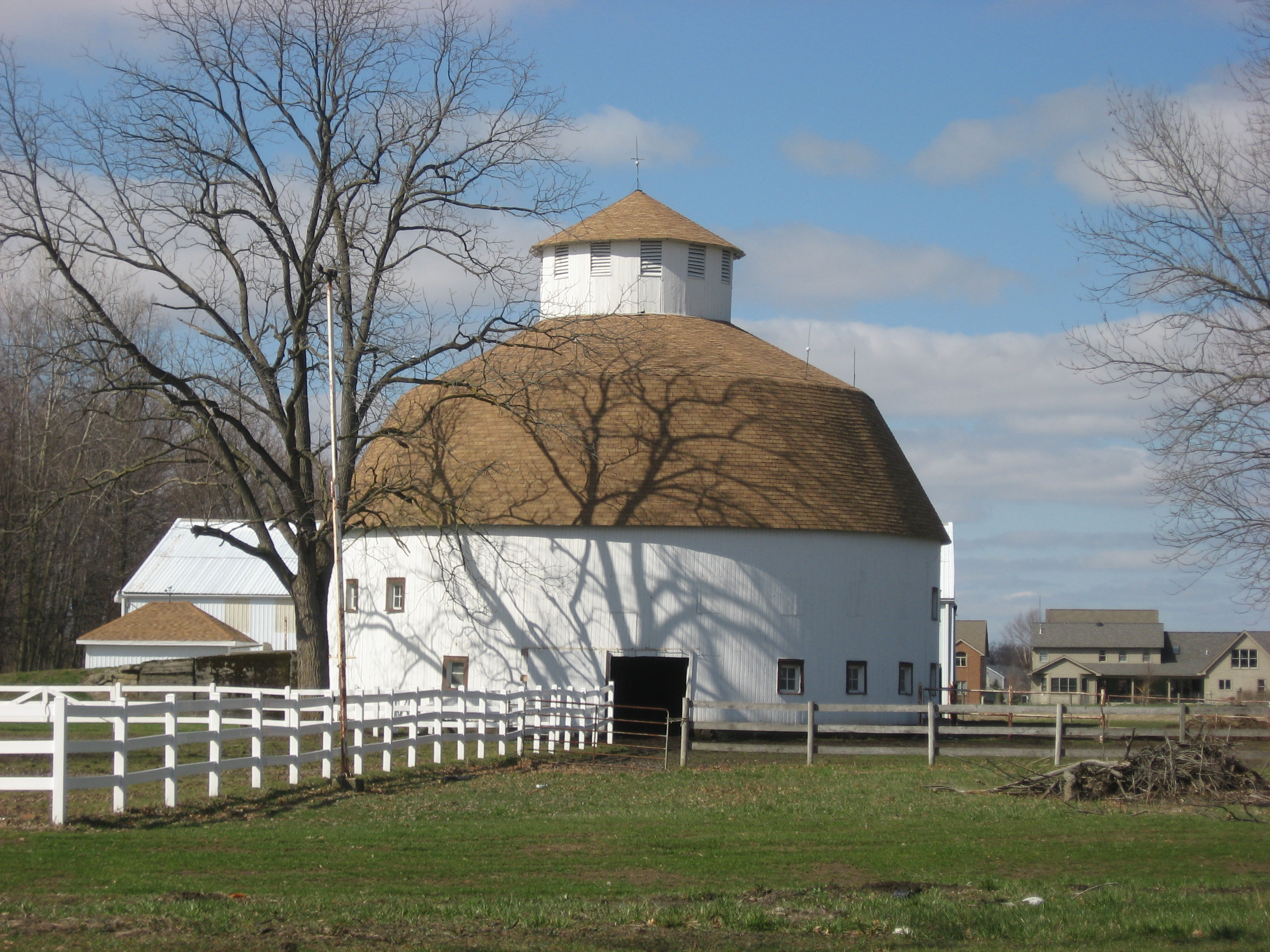
- The Isaac Rozell Round Barn near Elida

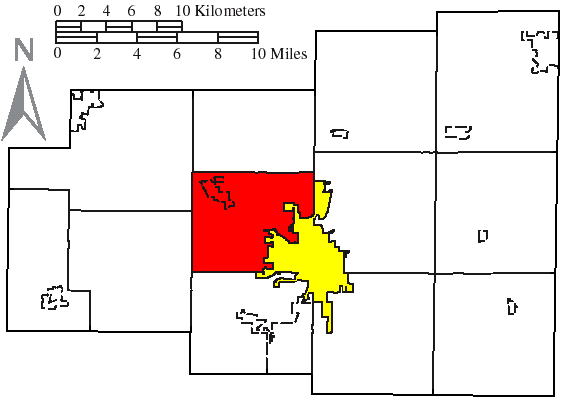
- Location of American Township, Allen County, Ohio
- Coordinates: 40°46′1″N 84°9′59″W
- Country: United States
- State: Ohio
- County: Allen

Area
  - Total: 24.2 sq mi (62.6 km^{2})
  - Land: 24.2 sq mi (62.6 km^{2})
  - Water: 0 sq mi (0.0 km^{2})
- Elevation: 823 ft (251 m)

Population (2020)
  - Total: 14,538
  - Density: 599/sq mi (231.1/km^{2})
- Time zone: UTC-5 (Eastern (EST))
  - Summer (DST): UTC-4 (EDT)
- FIPS code: 39-01756
- GNIS feature ID: 1085690
- Website: www.amertwp.us

American Township is one of the twelve townships of Allen County, Ohio, United States. The 2020 census found 14,538 people in the township.

== Geography ==
Located in the center of the county, it borders the following townships:

- Sugar Creek Township - north
- Bath Township - east
- Perry Township - southeastern corner
- Shawnee Township - south
- Amanda Township - southwest
- Marion Township - northwest

Two municipalities are located in American Township: the village of Elida in the northwest, and part of the city of Lima, the county seat of Allen County, in the southeast.

== Name and history ==
It is the only American Township statewide. American Township was named German Township until 1918 when the township's citizens successfully petitioned for the name change, due to the sinking of the Lusitania. The petition cited Anti-German sentiment as the primary reason for the request.

== Demographics ==
Historical population
Census	Pop.	Note	%±
2000	15,516		—
2010	14,381		−7.3%
2020	14,538		1.1%
U.S. Decennial Census

== Government ==
The township is governed by a three-member board of trustees, who are elected in November of odd-numbered years to a four-year term beginning on the following January 1. Two are elected in the year after the presidential election and one is elected in the year before it. There is also an elected township fiscal officer, who serves a four-year term beginning on April 1 of the year after the election, which is held in November of the year before the presidential election. Vacancies in the fiscal officership or on the board of trustees are filled by the remaining trustees.
