= West Newton, Ohio =

Unincorporated community in Ohio, U.S.

Coordinates: 40°39′14″N 83°53′34″W

West Newton is an unincorporated community in Allen County, in the U.S. state of Ohio.

== History ==
West Newton was platted in 1850. A post office called West Newton was established in 1851, and remained in operation until 1910.
