= Sugar Creek Township, Allen County, Ohio =

Township in Ohio, US

- Township
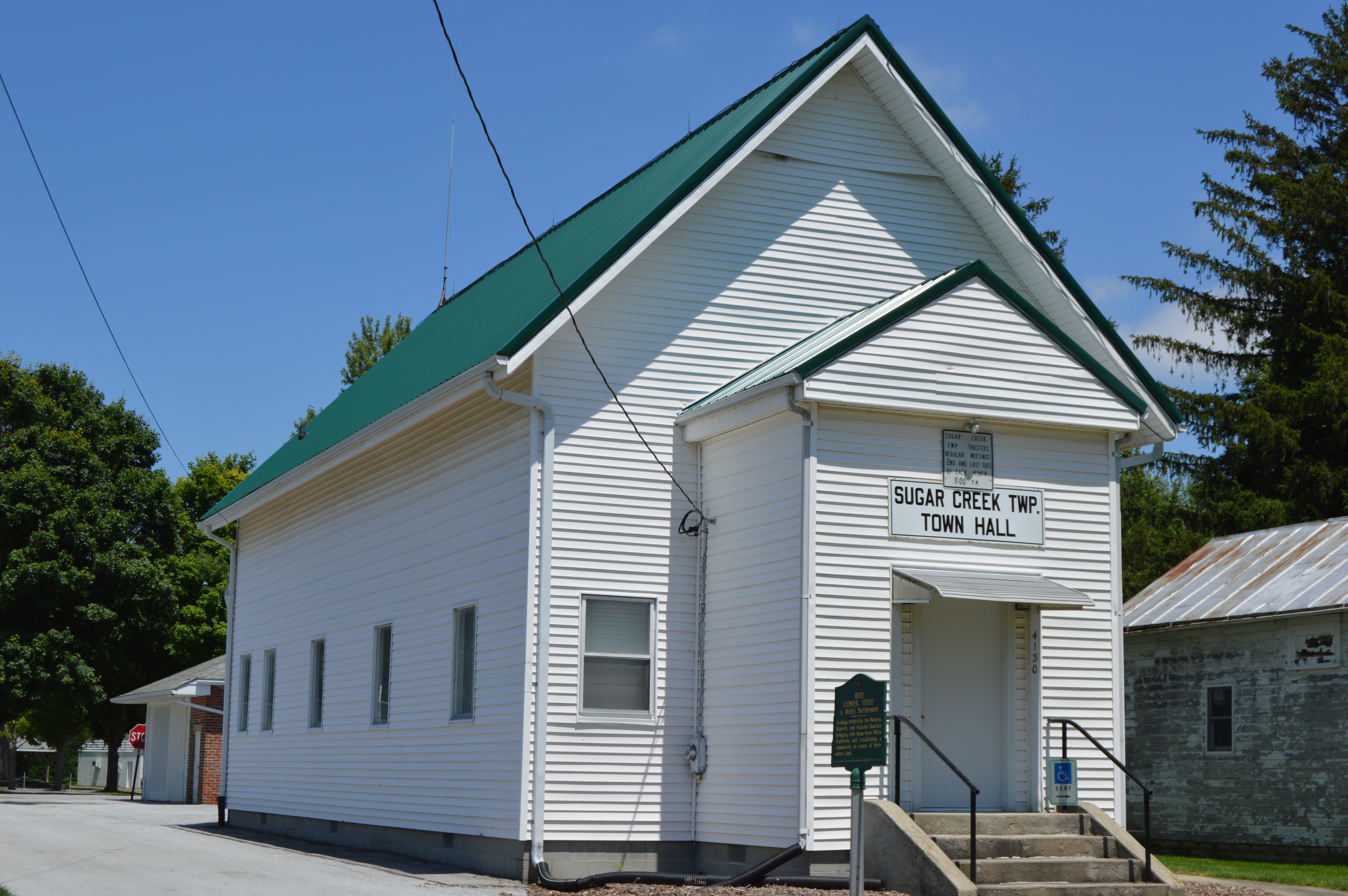
- Township hall at Gomer

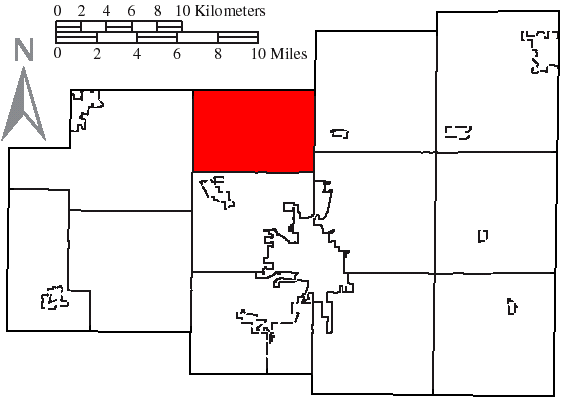
- Location of Sugar Creek Township, Allen County, Ohio
- Coordinates: 40°49′59″N 84°10′28″W
- Country: United States
- State: Ohio
- County: Allen

Area
  - Total: 24.2 sq mi (62.7 km^{2})
  - Land: 24.1 sq mi (62.4 km^{2})
  - Water: 0.12 sq mi (0.3 km^{2})
- Elevation: 784 ft (239 m)

Population (2020)
  - Total: 1,231
  - Density: 53/sq mi (20.6/km^{2})
- Time zone: UTC-5 (Eastern (EST))
  - Summer (DST): UTC-4 (EDT)
- FIPS code: 39-75199
- GNIS feature ID: 1085701

Sugar Creek Township is one of the twelve townships of Allen County, Ohio, United States. The population was 1,231 at the 2020 census.

== Geography ==
Located in the northern part of the county, it borders the following townships:

- Sugar Creek Township, Putnam County - north
- Monroe Township - northeast
- Bath Township - southeast
- American Township - south
- Marion Township - west
- Jennings Township, Putnam County - northwest corner

No municipalities are located in Sugar Creek Township, although the unincorporated community of Gomer lies in the township's north.

== Name and history ==
This township took its name from Sugar Creek. It is one of five Sugar Creek Townships statewide.

== Government ==
The township is governed by a three-member board of trustees, who are elected in November of odd-numbered years to a four-year term beginning on the following January 1. Two are elected in the year after the presidential election and one is elected in the year before it. There is also an elected township fiscal officer, who serves a four-year term beginning on April 1 of the year after the election, which is held in November of the year before the presidential election. Vacancies in the fiscal officership or on the board of trustees are filled by the remaining trustees.
