= Round Barn (Lima, Ohio) =

- U.S. National Register of Historic Places
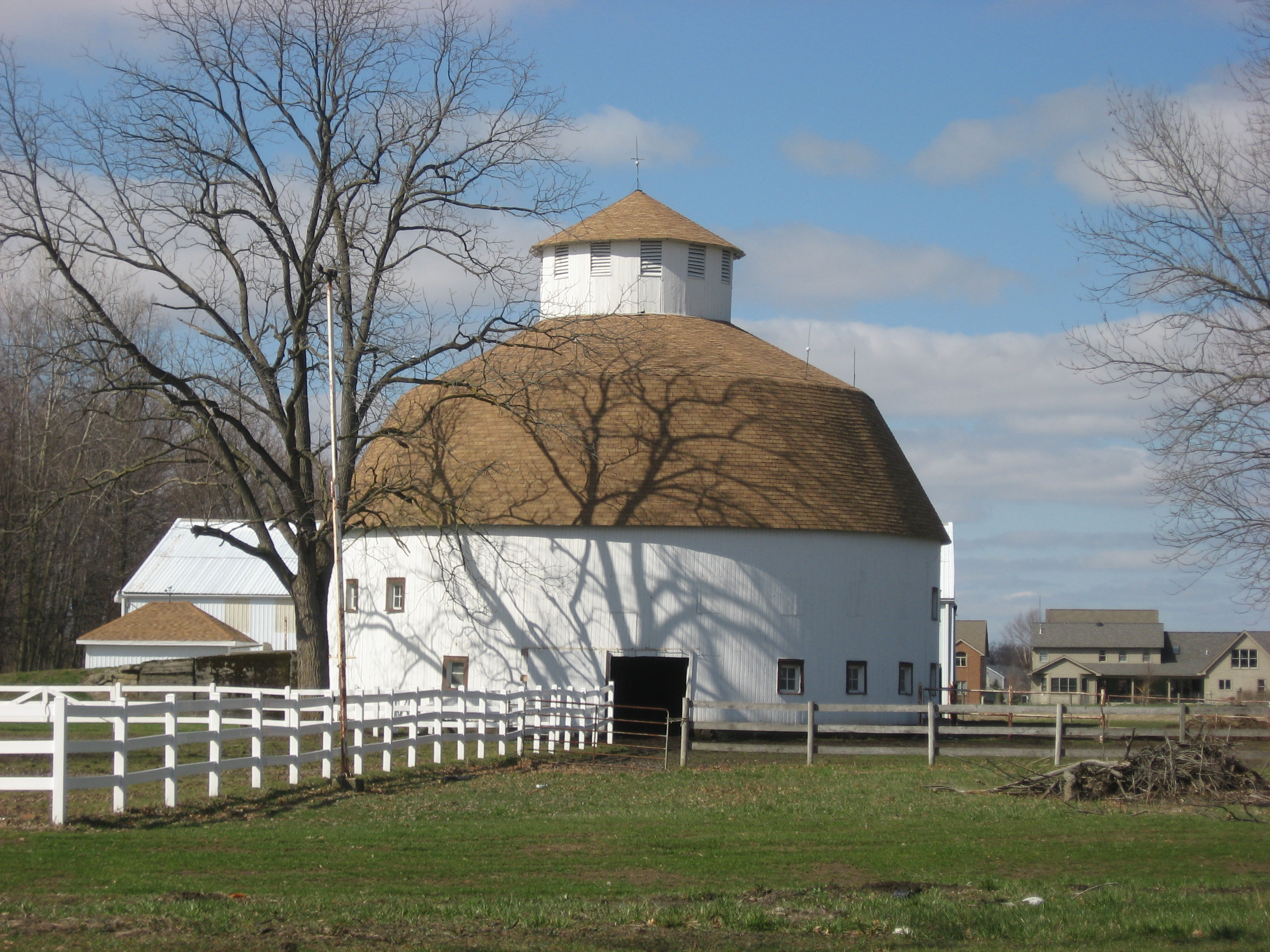
- Round Barn viewed from East Road

- Location within Ohio Location within the United States
- Nearest city: Lima, Ohio
- Coordinates: 40°46′26″N 84°11′25″W
- Area: 2.8 acres (1.1 ha)
- Built: 1911
- Built by: Isaac Rozell
- Architectural style: Round Barn
- MPS: Round Barns in the Black Swamp of Northwest Ohio TR
- NRHP reference No.: 80002934
- Added to NRHP: April 17, 1980

The Round Barn near Lima, Ohio, United States, is a round barn that was built in 1911. It was listed on the National Register of Historic Places in 1980.

It may have been known also as Isaac Rozell Round Barn.
