= Monroe Township, Allen County, Ohio =

Township in Ohio, US

- Township
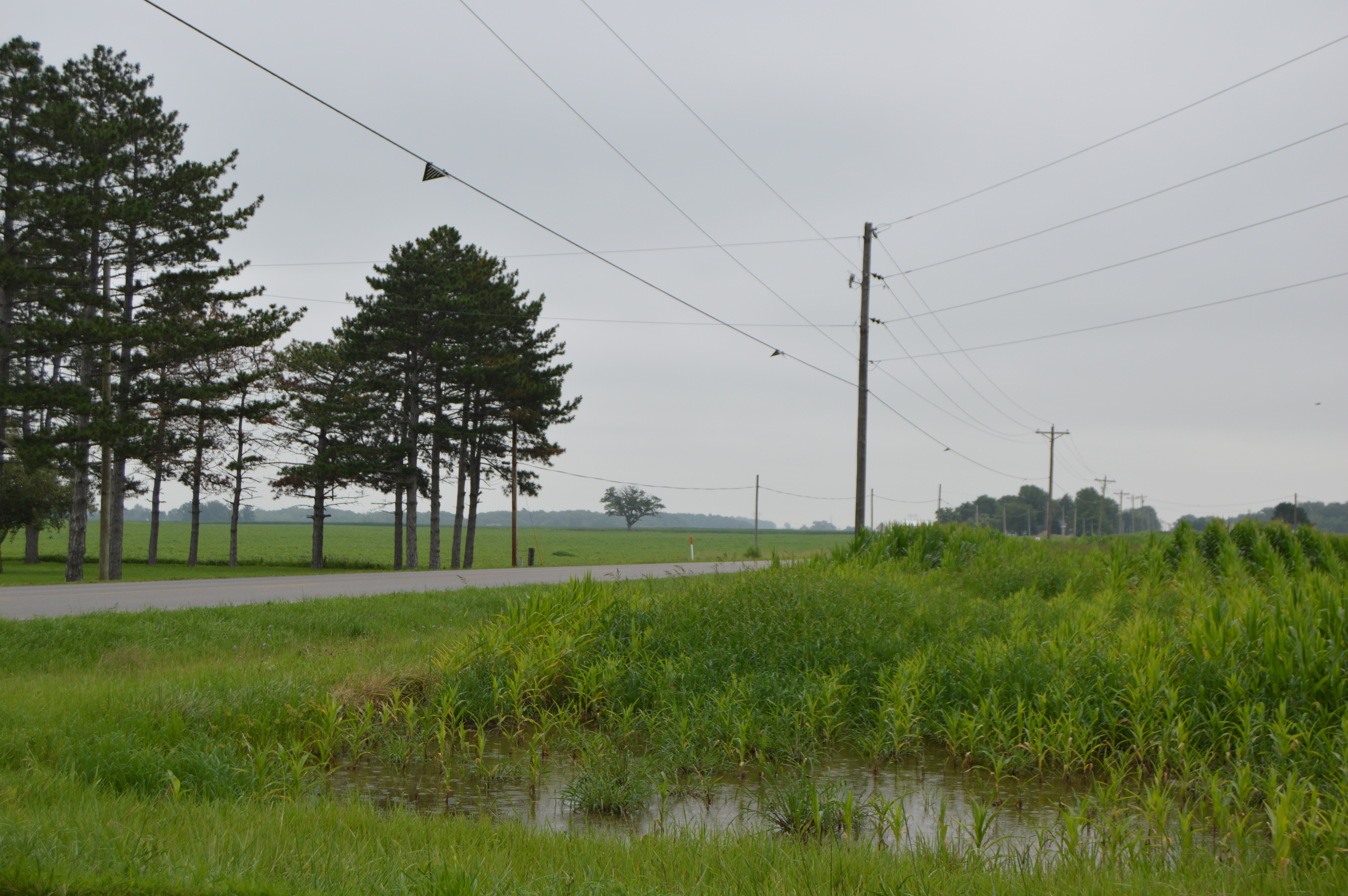
- Cornfield along the Lincoln Highway

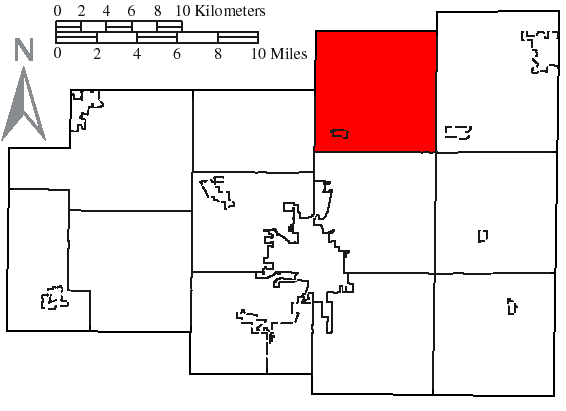
- Location of Monroe Township, Allen County, Ohio
- Coordinates: 40°51′14″N 84°2′47″W
- Country: United States
- State: Ohio
- County: Allen

Area
  - Total: 36.2 sq mi (93.7 km^{2})
  - Land: 36.1 sq mi (93.5 km^{2})
  - Water: 0.077 sq mi (0.2 km^{2})
- Elevation: 801 ft (244 m)

Population (2020)
  - Total: 2,067
  - Density: 62/sq mi (23.8/km^{2})
- Time zone: UTC-5 (Eastern (EST))
  - Summer (DST): UTC-4 (EDT)
- FIPS code: 39-51282
- GNIS feature ID: 1085696

Monroe Township is one of the twelve townships of Allen County, Ohio, United States. The 2020 census found 2,067 people in the township.

== Geography ==
Located in the northern part of the county, it borders the following townships:

- Pleasant Township, Putnam County - north
- Richland Township - east
- Jackson Township - southeast corner
- Bath Township - south
- Sugar Creek Township - southwest
- Sugar Creek Township, Putnam County - northwest

The village of Cairo is located in southwestern Monroe Township.

== Name and history ==
It is one of twenty-two Monroe Townships statewide.

== Government ==
The township is governed by a three-member board of trustees, who are elected in November of odd-numbered years to a four-year term beginning on the following January 1. Two are elected in the year after the presidential election and one is elected in the year before it. There is also an elected township fiscal officer, who serves a four-year term beginning on April 1 of the year after the election, which is held in November of the year before the presidential election. Vacancies in the fiscal officership or on the board of trustees are filled by the remaining trustees.
