= Perry Township, Allen County, Ohio =

Township in Ohio, US

- Township
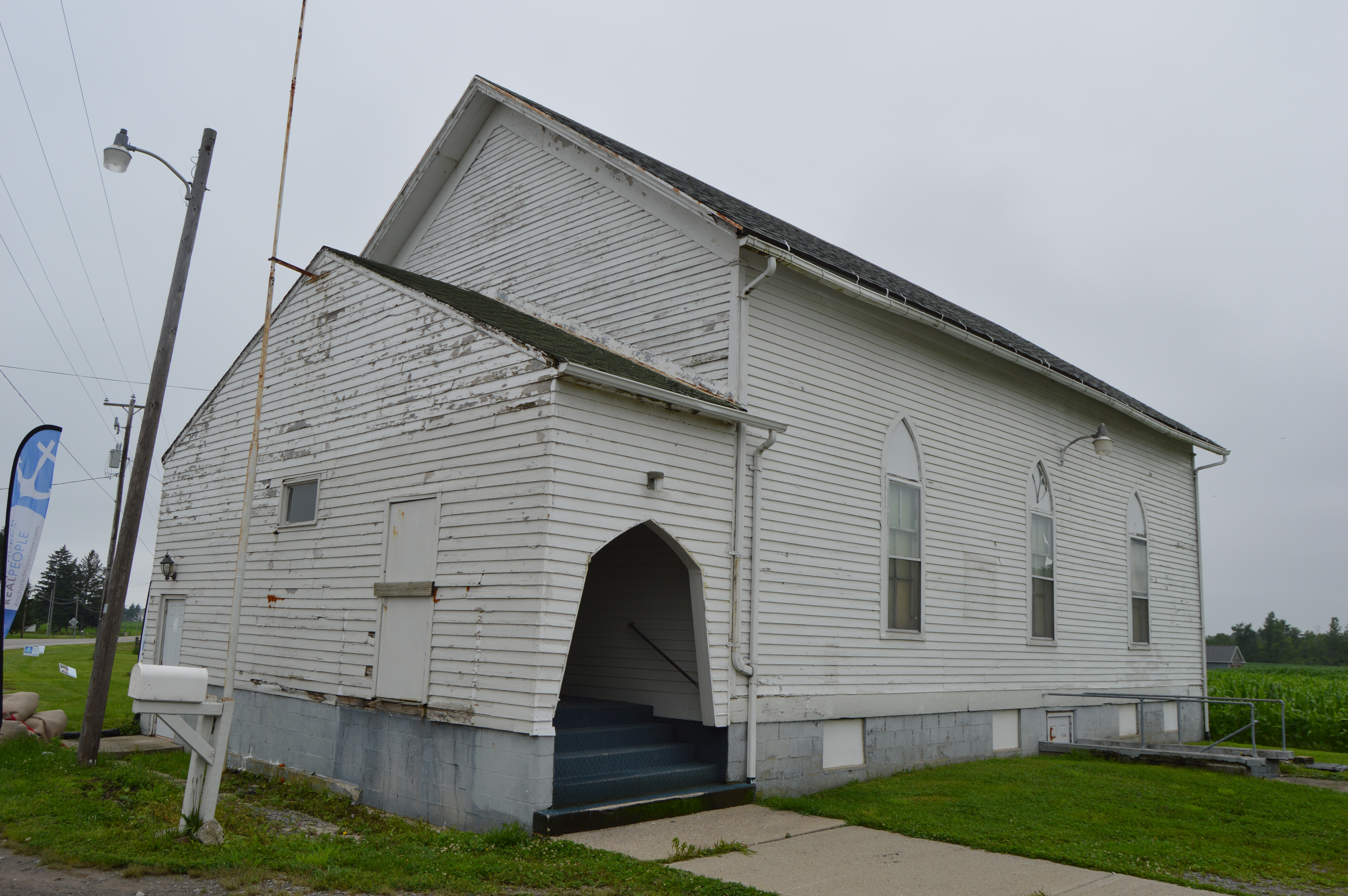
- Anchored Hope Baptist Church on State Route 117

- Logo

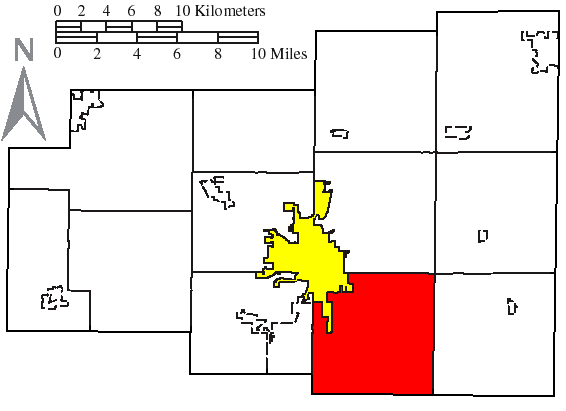
- Location of Perry Township, Allen County, Ohio
- Coordinates: 40°41′42″N 84°4′34″W
- Country: United States
- State: Ohio
- County: Allen

Area
  - Total: 32.8 sq mi (84.9 km^{2})
  - Land: 32.7 sq mi (84.7 km^{2})
  - Water: 0.077 sq mi (0.2 km^{2})
- Elevation: 932 ft (284 m)

Population (2020)
  - Total: 3,382
  - Density: 108/sq mi (41.7/km^{2})
- Time zone: UTC-5 (Eastern (EST))
  - Summer (DST): UTC-4 (EDT)
- FIPS code: 39-61742
- GNIS feature ID: 1085697
- Website: perryallenohio.com

Perry Township is one of the twelve townships of Allen County, Ohio, United States. The 2020 census found 3,382 people in the township.

== Geography ==
Located in the southern part of the county, it borders the following townships:

- Bath Township - north
- Jackson Township - northeast corner
- Auglaize Township - east
- Wayne Township, Auglaize County - southeast corner
- Union Township, Auglaize County - south
- Duchouquet Township, Auglaize County - southwest
- Shawnee Township - west
- American Township - northwest corner

Part of the city of Lima, the county seat of Allen County, is located in northwestern Perry Township.

== Name and history ==
It is one of twenty-six Perry Townships statewide.

Perry Township was first settled in 1830 by one John Ridenour. The township was officially established in December 1833, and it was organized in the following April.

== Government ==
The township is governed by a three-member board of trustees, who are elected in November of odd-numbered years to a four-year term beginning on the following January 1. Two are elected in the year after the presidential election and one is elected in the year before it. There is also an elected township fiscal officer, who serves a four-year term beginning on April 1 of the year after the election, which is held in November of the year before the presidential election. Vacancies in the fiscal officership or on the board of trustees are filled by the remaining trustees.
