= Bath Township, Allen County, Ohio =

Township in Ohio, US

- Township
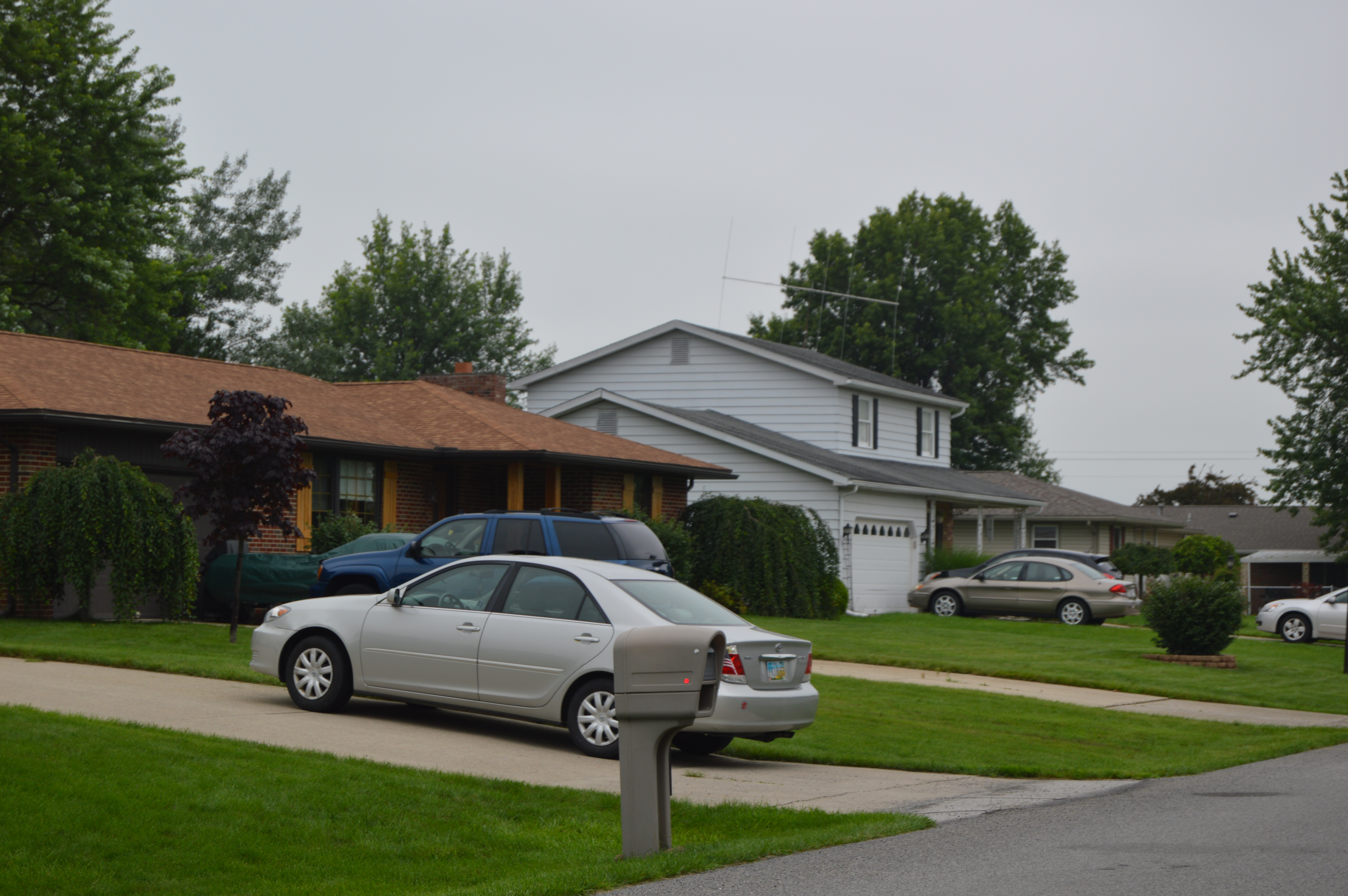
- Suburban neighborhood off Bluelick Road

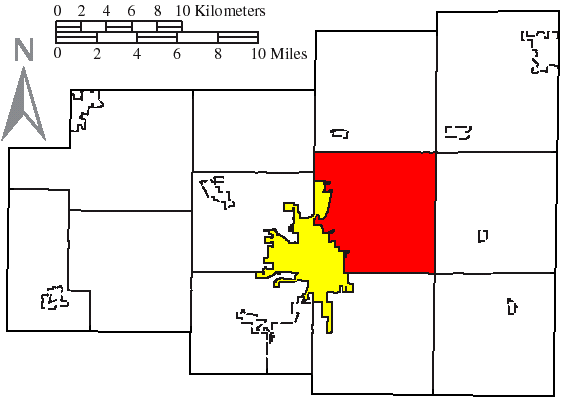
- Location of Bath Township, Allen County, Ohio
- Coordinates: 40°45′30″N 84°3′50″W
- Country: United States
- State: Ohio
- County: Allen

Area
  - Total: 32.0 sq mi (83.0 km^{2})
  - Land: 30.7 sq mi (79.5 km^{2})
  - Water: 1.4 sq mi (3.5 km^{2})
- Elevation: 899 ft (274 m)

Population (2020)
  - Total: 9,399
  - Density: 317/sq mi (122.3/km^{2})
- Time zone: UTC-5 (Eastern (EST))
  - Summer (DST): UTC-4 (EDT)
- FIPS code: 39-04206
- GNIS feature ID: 1085692
- Website: www.bathtwp.com

Bath Township is one of the twelve townships of Allen County, Ohio, United States. The 2020 census found 9,399 people in the unincorporated parts of the township, outside the city of Lima.

== Geography ==
Located in the center of the county, it borders the following townships:

- Monroe Township – north
- Richland Township – northeast corner
- Jackson Township – east
- Auglaize Township – southeast corner
- Perry Township – south
- Shawnee Township – southwest corner
- American Township – west
- Sugar Creek Township – northwest

Part of the city of Lima, the county seat of Allen County, is located in southwestern Bath Township.

== Name and history ==
Statewide, other Bath Townships are located in Greene and Summit counties.

Bath Township was the first permanent settlement within the present day bounds of Allen County. The first settlers in the township were Christopher S. Wood and his family, who settled in section 7 of Bath Township in 1824. Wood was one of the first American pioneers to settle in that area, and he established the first government in 1829 after settling there. There is no record of its settling in the 1831 registers of the newly formed Allen County, yet it was a fully functioning community by that time. In 1831 the people of the soon to be Jackson Township petitioned to break away from Bath, and their request was granted. Until the formation of Lima and the nearby Ottawa Township (now subsumed by Lima), the future land was also part of Bath.

== Government ==
Historical population
Census	Pop.	Note	%±
1880	1,532		—
1890	1,448		−5.5%
2000	9,819		—
2010	9,725		−1.0%
2020	9,399		−3.4%

The township is governed by a three-member board of trustees, who are elected in November of odd-numbered years to a four-year term beginning on the following January 1. Two are elected in the year after the presidential election and one is elected in the year before it. There is also an elected township fiscal officer, who serves a four-year term beginning on April 1 of the year after the election, which is held in November of the year before the presidential election. Vacancies in the fiscal officership or on the board of trustees are filled by the remaining trustees. The current chairperson is Roy A. Hollenbacher.

=== Schools ===
Bath Township is serviced by one school district, Bath Local School District. The district contains an elementary school, a junior high school, and a high school (Bath High School).
