= Auglaize Township, Allen County, Ohio =

Township in Ohio, US

Auglaize Township, Auglaize County, Ohio
- Township
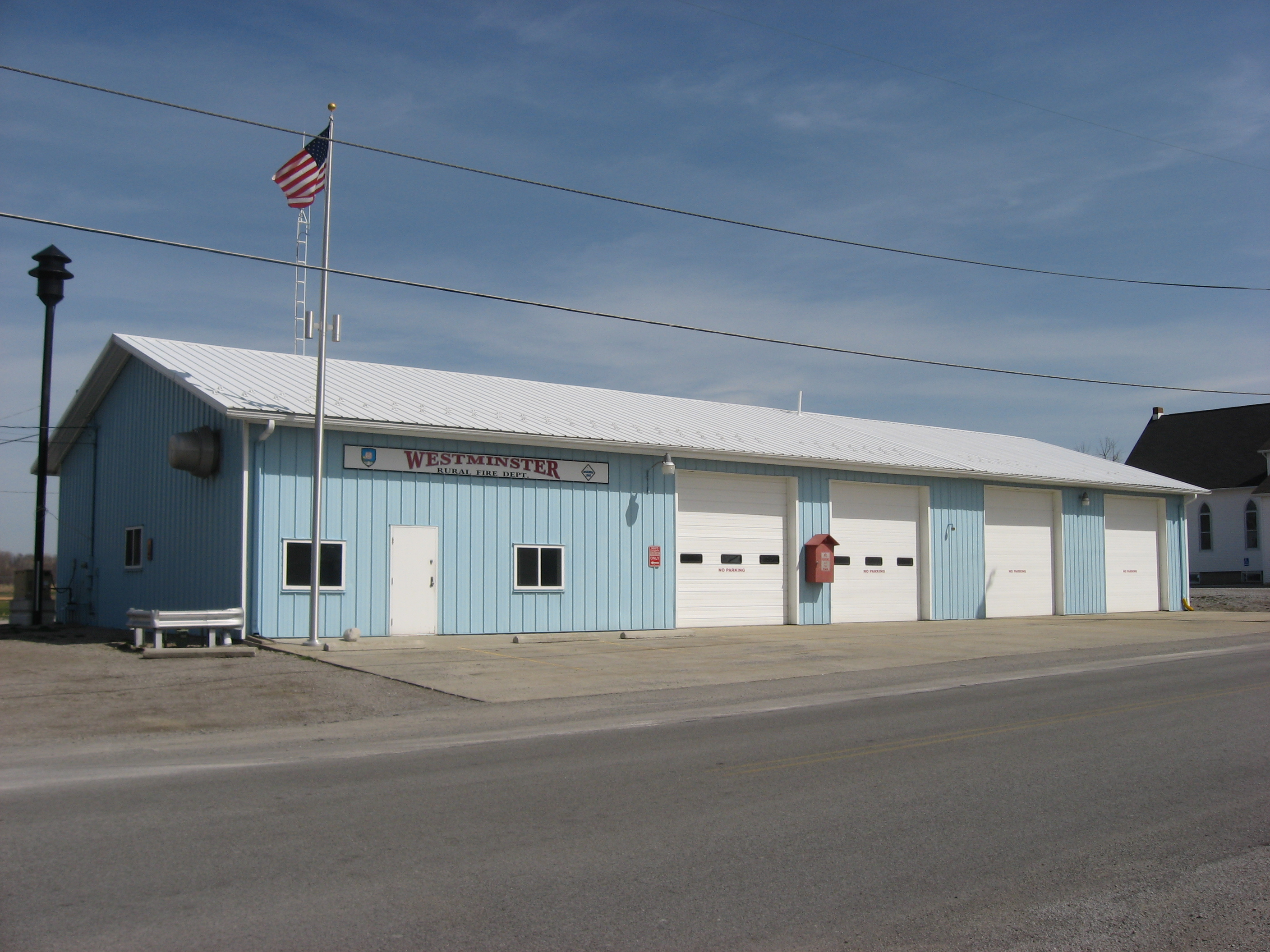
- Fire department at Westminster

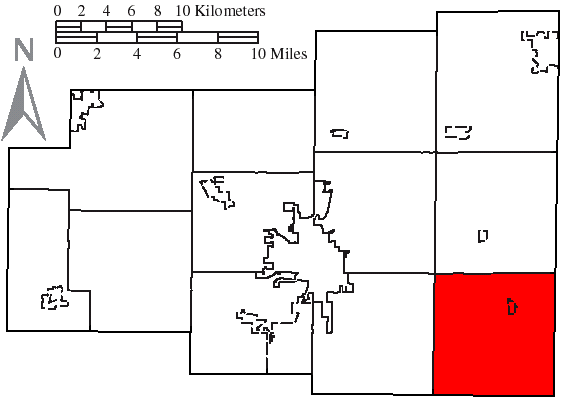
- Location of Auglaize Township, Allen County, Ohio
- Coordinates: 40°40′54″N 83°56′24″W
- Country: United States
- State: Ohio
- County: Allen

Area
  - Total: 36.1 sq mi (93.6 km^{2})
  - Land: 36.0 sq mi (93.2 km^{2})
  - Water: 0.15 sq mi (0.4 km^{2})
- Elevation: 980 ft (300 m)

Population (2020)
  - Total: 2,757
  - Density: 77/sq mi (29.9/km^{2})
- Time zone: UTC-5 (Eastern (EST))
  - Summer (DST): UTC-4 (EDT)
- FIPS code: 39-02988
- GNIS feature ID: 1085691
- Website: https://auglaizetwpallencooh.gov/

Auglaize Township is one of the twelve townships of Allen County, Ohio, United States. The 2020 census found 2,757 people in the township.

== Geography ==
Located in the southeastern corner of the county, it borders the following townships:

- Jackson Township - north
- Liberty Township, Hardin County - northeast corner
- Marion Township, Hardin County - east
- Roundhead Township, Hardin County - southeast corner
- Wayne Township, Auglaize County - south
- Union Township, Auglaize County - southwest corner
- Perry Township - west
- Bath Township - northwest corner

The village of Harrod is located in northern Auglaize Township, and the unincorporated community of Westminster lies in the township's west.

== Name and history ==
Statewide, the only other Auglaize Township is located in Paulding County.

Auglaize Township was organized in 1832.

== Government ==
The township is governed by a three-member board of trustees, who are elected in November of odd-numbered years to a four-year term beginning on the following January 1. Two are elected in the year after the presidential election and one is elected in the year before it. There is also an elected township fiscal officer, who serves a four-year term beginning on April 1 of the year after the election, which is held in November of the year before the presidential election. Vacancies in the fiscal officership or on the board of trustees are filled by the remaining trustees. The current Chairperson is T. Blain Brock II
