= Marion Township, Allen County, Ohio =

Township in Ohio, US

- Township
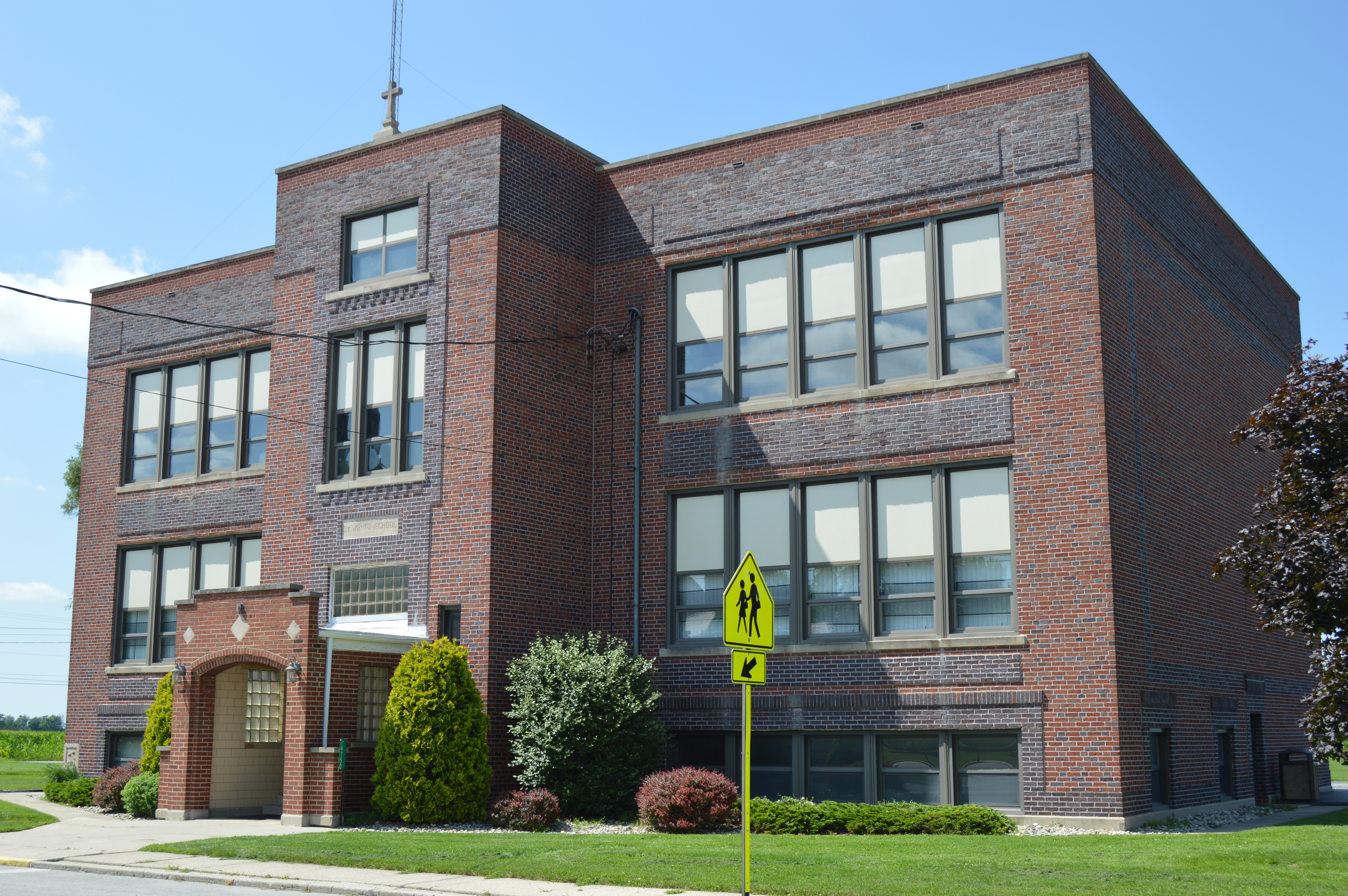
- Community school at Landeck

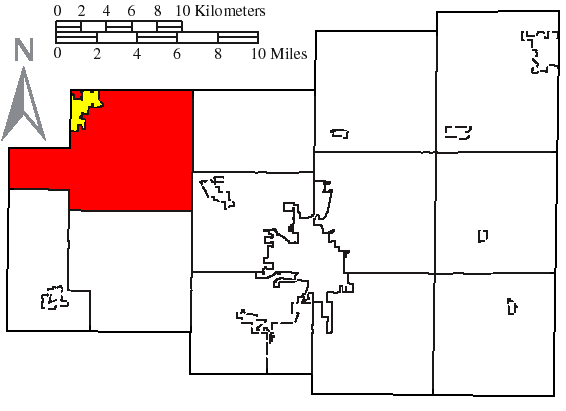
- Location of Marion Township, Allen County, Ohio
- Coordinates: 40°50′1″N 84°18′14″W
- Country: United States
- State: Ohio
- County: Allen

Area
  - Total: 42.5 sq mi (110.2 km^{2})
  - Land: 42.4 sq mi (109.7 km^{2})
  - Water: 0.19 sq mi (0.5 km^{2})
- Elevation: 781 ft (238 m)

Population (2020)
  - Total: 6,629
  - Density: 159/sq mi (61.2/km^{2})
- Time zone: UTC-5 (Eastern (EST))
  - Summer (DST): UTC-4 (EDT)
- FIPS code: 39-47656
- GNIS feature ID: 1085695

Marion Township is one of the twelve townships of Allen County, Ohio, United States. As of the 2020 census, the population was 6,629.

== Geography ==
Located in the northwestern corner of the county, it borders the following townships:

- Jennings Township, Putnam County - north
- Sugar Creek Township, Putnam County - northeast corner
- Sugar Creek Township - east
- American Township - southeast corner
- Amanda Township - south
- Spencer Township - southwest
- Jennings Township, Van Wert County - west
- Washington Township, Van Wert County - northwest

Part of the city of Delphos is located in northwestern Marion Township.

== Name and history ==
It is one of twelve Marion Townships statewide.

== Government ==
The township is governed by a three-member board of trustees, who are elected in November of odd-numbered years to a four-year term beginning on the following January 1. Two are elected in the year after the presidential election and one is elected in the year before it. There is also an elected township fiscal officer, who serves a four-year term beginning on April 1 of the year after the election, which is held in November of the year before the presidential election. Vacancies in the fiscal officership or on the board of trustees are filled by the remaining trustees.
