= Jackson Township, Allen County, Ohio =

Township in Ohio, US

- Township
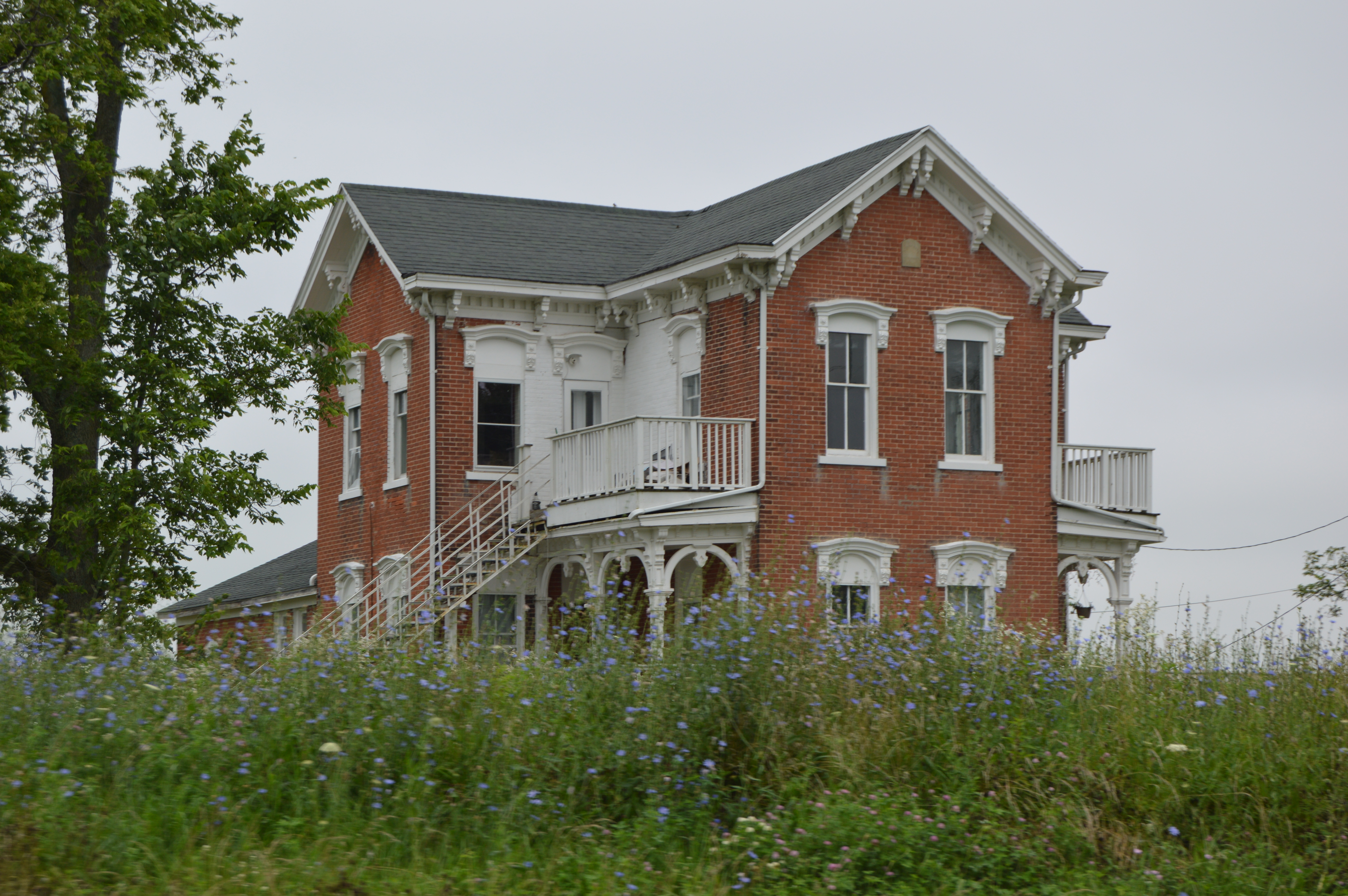
- 1870s farmhouse on Napoleon Road

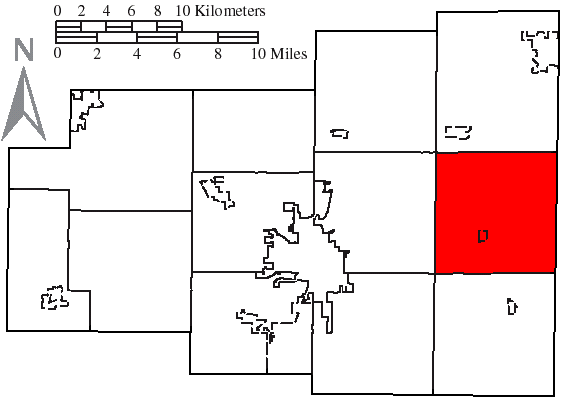
- Location of Jackson Township, Allen County, Ohio
- Coordinates: 40°46′8″N 83°56′36″W
- Country: United States
- State: Ohio
- County: Allen

Area
  - Total: 36.0 sq mi (93.3 km^{2})
  - Land: 35.7 sq mi (92.5 km^{2})
  - Water: 0.31 sq mi (0.8 km^{2})
- Elevation: 915 ft (279 m)

Population (2020)
  - Total: 3,143
  - Density: 85/sq mi (33/km^{2})
- Time zone: UTC-5 (Eastern (EST))
  - Summer (DST): UTC-4 (EDT)
- FIPS code: 39-37646
- GNIS feature ID: 1085693

Jackson Township is one of the twelve townships of Allen County, Ohio, United States. The 2020 census found 3,143 people in the township.

== Geography ==
Located in the eastern part of the county, it borders the following townships:

- Richland Township - north
- Orange Township, Hancock County - northeast corner
- Liberty Township, Hardin County - east
- Marion Township, Hardin County - southeast corner
- Auglaize Township - south
- Perry Township - southwest corner
- Monroe Township - west
- Bath Township - northwest corner

The village of Lafayette is located in central Jackson Township.

== Name and history ==
It is one of thirty-seven Jackson Townships statewide.

== Government ==
The township is governed by a three-member board of trustees, who are elected in November of odd-numbered years to a four-year term beginning on the following January 1. Two are elected in the year after the presidential election and one is elected in the year before it. There is also an elected township fiscal officer, who serves a four-year term beginning on April 1 of the year after the election, which is held in November of the year before the presidential election. Vacancies in the fiscal officership or on the board of trustees are filled by the remaining trustees.
