= Amanda Township, Allen County, Ohio =

Township in Ohio, US

- Township
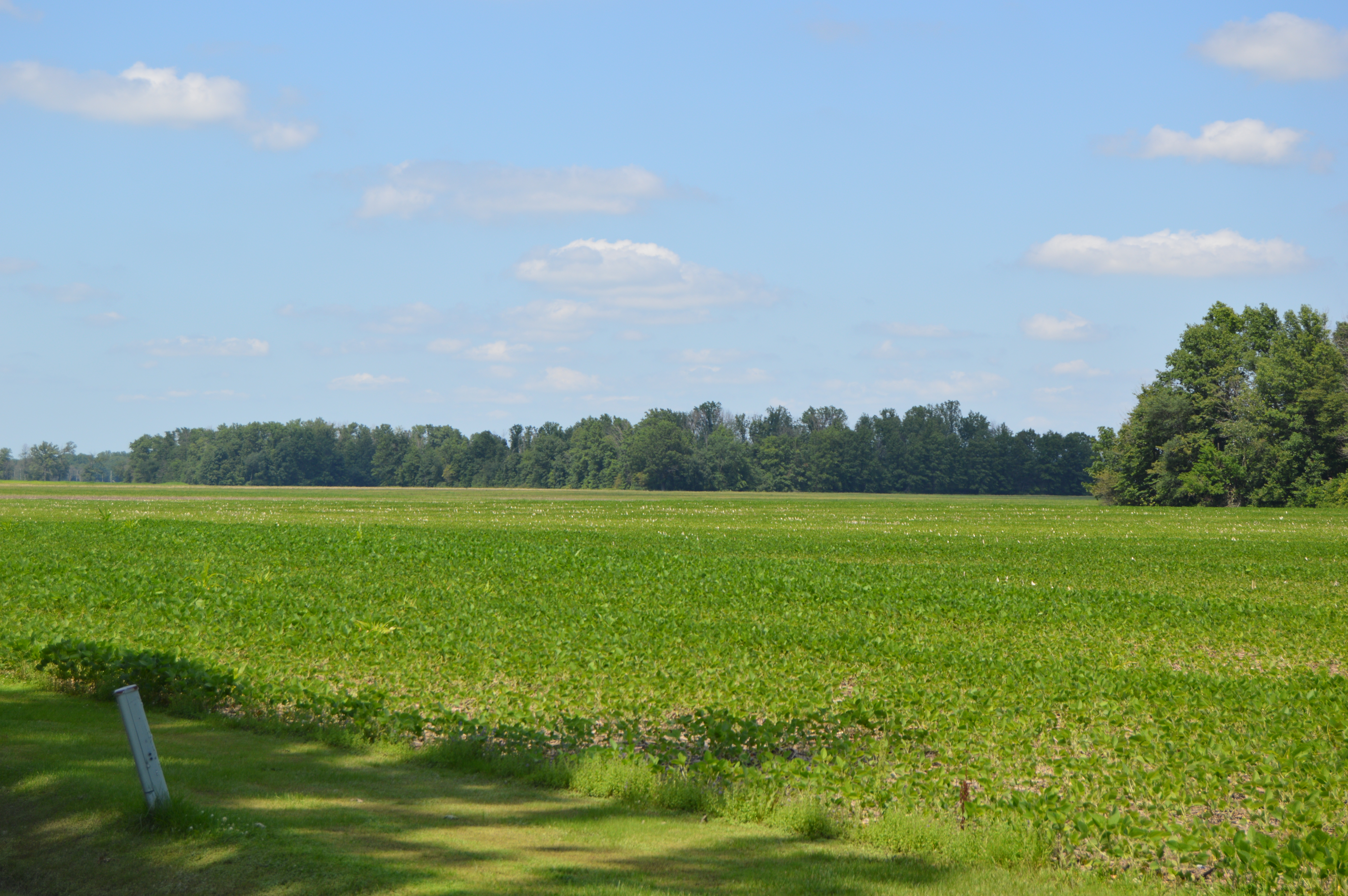
- Fields north of Allentown Road

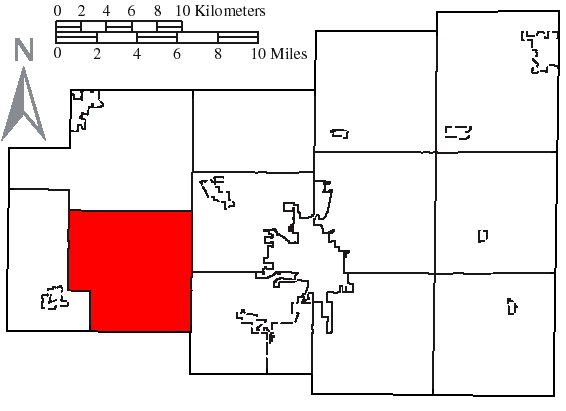
- Location of Amanda Township, Allen County, Ohio
- Coordinates: 40°44′11″N 84°16′19″W
- Country: United States
- State: Ohio
- County: Allen

Area
  - Total: 34.4 sq mi (89.1 km^{2})
  - Land: 33.3 sq mi (86.3 km^{2})
  - Water: 1.1 sq mi (2.8 km^{2})
- Elevation: 810 ft (247 m)

Population (2020)
  - Total: 2,061
  - Density: 62/sq mi (24/km^{2})
- Time zone: UTC-5 (Eastern (EST))
  - Summer (DST): UTC-4 (EDT)
- FIPS code: 39-01602
- GNIS feature ID: 1085689

Amanda Township is one of the twelve townships of Allen County, Ohio, United States. As of the 2020 census the population was 2,061.

== Geography ==
Located in the western part of the county, it borders the following townships:

- Marion Township – north
- American Township – northeast
- Shawnee Township – southeast
- Logan Township, Auglaize County – south
- Spencer Township – west

No municipalities are located in Amanda Township.

== Name and history ==
Statewide, other Amanda Townships are located in Fairfield and Hancock counties.

== Government ==
The township is governed by a three-member board of trustees, who are elected in November of odd-numbered years to a four-year term beginning on the following January 1. Two are elected in the year after the presidential election and one is elected in the year before it. There is also an elected township fiscal officer, who serves a four-year term beginning on April 1 of the year after the election, which is held in November of the year before the presidential election. Vacancies in the fiscal officership or on the board of trustees are filled by the remaining trustees.
