= Lima–Van Wert–Wapakoneta combined statistical area =

Coordinates: 40°42′N 84°15′W

Lima–Van Wert–Celina, OH CSA
- Combined Statistical Area
Map of Lima–Van Wert–Celina, OH CSA
City of Lima
Lima MSA
Wapakoneta µSA
Celina µSA
Van Wert µSA

The Lima–Van Wert–Celina, OH Combined Statistical Area (CSA) is made up of four counties in Northwest Ohio. The Lima, OH Metropolitan Statistical Area and three Micropolitan Statistical Areas – Celina, Van Wert and Wapakoneta, are components of the CSA. As of the 2020 Census, the CSA had a population of 220,087, with an estimated population of 218,540 in 2025.

== Components ==
| Statistical Area | 2025 Estimate | 2020 Census | Change | Area | Density |
|---|---|---|---|---|---|
| Lima, OH Metropolitan Statistical Area | 100,881 | 102,206 | −1.30% | 407 sq mi (1,050 km^{2}) | 248/sq mi (96/km^{2}) |
| Wapakoneta, OH Micropolitan Statistical Area | 45,909 | 46,422 | −1.11% | 402 sq mi (1,040 km^{2}) | 114/sq mi (44/km^{2}) |
| Celina, OH Micropolitan Statistical Area | 42,737 | 42,528 | +0.49% | 473 sq mi (1,230 km^{2}) | 90/sq mi (35/km^{2}) |
| Van Wert, OH Micropolitan Statistical Area | 29,013 | 28,931 | +0.28% | 410 sq mi (1,100 km^{2}) | 71/sq mi (27/km^{2}) |
| Total | 218,540 | 220,087 | −0.70% | 1,692 sq mi (4,380 km^{2}) | 129/sq mi (50/km^{2}) |

== Communities ==
=== Cities ===
- Delphos
- Lima (Principal city)
- Saint Marys
- Van Wert (Principal city)
- Wapakoneta (Principal city)

=== Villages ===
- Beaverdam
- Bluffton (partial)
- Buckland
- Cairo
- Convoy
- Cridersville
- Elgin
- Elida
- Harrod
- Lafayette
- Middle Point
- Minster
- New Bremen
- New Knoxville
- Ohio City
- Scott (partial)
- Spencerville
- Uniopolis
- Venedocia
- Waynesfield
- Willshire
- Wren

=== Unincorporated places ===
- Fort Shawnee
- Fryburg
- Geyer
- Glenmore
- Glynwood
- Gomer
- Kossuth
- Lock Two
- Moulton
- New Hampshire
- Saint Johns
- Santa Fe
- Westminster

== Townships ==
=== Allen County ===
- Amanda
- American
- Auglaize
- Bath
- Jackson
- Marion
- Monroe
- Perry
- Richland
- Shawnee
- Spencer
- Sugar Creek

=== Auglaize County ===
- Clay
- Duchouquet
- German
- Goshen
- Jackson
- Logan
- Moulton
- Noble
- Pusheta
- Saint Marys
- Salem
- Union
- Washington
- Wayne

=== Van Wert County ===
- Harrison
- Hoaglin
- Jackson
- Jennings
- Liberty
- Pleasant
- Ridge
- Tully
- Union
- Washington
- Willshire
- York

== Demographics ==
As of the census of 2000, there were 184,743 people, 69,609 households, and 49,333 families residing within the CSA. The racial makeup of the CSA was 90.28% White, 7.34% African American, 0.19% Native American, 0.46% Asian, 0.01% Pacific Islander, 0.54% from other races, and 1.19% from two or more races. Hispanic or Latino of any race were 1.25% of the population.

The median income for a household in the CSA was $39,971, and the median income for a family was $47,083. Males had a median income of $34,982 versus $23,735 for females. The per capita income for the CSA was $18,466.

== See also ==
- Ohio census statistical areas
