= Ohio State Route 81 =

State highway in western Ohio, US

State Route 81

Route information
- Maintained by ODOT
- Length: 70.489 mi (113.441 km)
- Existed: 1927–present

Major junctions
- West end: SR 124 near Willshire
- US 33 / SR 49 in Willshire; US 127 near Rockford; I-75 near Lima; US 68 in Dunkirk
- East end: SR 53 in Patterson

Location
- Country: United States
- State: Ohio
- Counties: Van Wert, Allen, Hardin

Highway system
- Ohio State Highway System; Interstate; US; State; Scenic
← SR 80	→ SR 82

State Route 81 (SR 81) is an east–west route in western Ohio. Its western terminus is at the Indiana state line near Willshire (the route continues as State Road 124), and its eastern terminus is at SR 53 in Patterson. The route also goes through or close to the towns of Elgin, Lima, Ada, and Dunkirk.

== History ==
SR 81 was certified by 1927. It was originally routed from Ada to Patterson on the former northernmost section of the now-defunct SR 69. At the time of SR 81's current designation, SR 69 was rerouted to Mount Cory (this route is now part of SR 235). SR 81 was extended to the Indiana state line in 1940 along formerly unnumbered roads from Ada to Lima and along the route of the now-defunct SR 704 (which was created in 1937) from Lima to the state line. No major changes have occurred to the routing since then.

From 1923 to 1926, SR 81 was a short route in northeastern Ohio between Brentwood Lake and Twinsburg. In 1926, the route became part of SR 82.

== Major junctions ==
County	Location	mi	km	Destinations	Notes
Van Wert	Willshire Township	0.000	0.000	SR 124 west	Indiana state line
Van Wert	Willshire	0.422	0.679	US 33 west (Decatur Road)	Western end of US 33 concurrency
Van Wert	Willshire	0.633	1.019	US 33 east / SR 49 south (State Street)	Eastern end of US 33 concurrency; eastern end of SR 49 concurrency
Van Wert	Willshire Township	0.730	1.175	SR 49 north	Western end of SR 49 concurrency
Van Wert	Liberty Township	9.123	14.682	SR 118 – Ohio City, Rockford	
Van Wert	Liberty Township	11.712	18.849	US 127 – Celina, Van Wert	
Van Wert	Jennings Township	20.364	32.773	SR 116 / Elgin Converse Road – Venedocia, St. Marys	
Allen	Spencer–Amanda township line	24.887– 24.935	40.052– 40.129	SR 66 south – Spencerville	Western end of SR 66 concurrency
Allen	Amanda Township	25.175	40.515	SR 66 north – Delphos	Eastern end of SR 66 concurrency
Allen	Lima	37.587	60.490	SR 309 west (North Jameson Avenue)	Western end of SR 309 concurrency
Allen	Lima	38.467	61.907	SR 65 (North West Street)	Western end of SR 65 southbound concurrency
Allen	Lima	38.519	61.990	SR 65 north (North Elizabeth Street)	Western end of SR 65 northbound concurrency
Allen	Lima	38.711	62.299	SR 65 south / SR 309 east (North Union Street)	Eastern end of SR 65 southbound / SR 309 eastbound concurrency
Allen	Lima	38.762	62.381	SR 65 / SR 309 (North Central Avenue)	Eastern end of SR 65 northbound / SR 309 westbound concurrency
Allen	Bath Township	40.742	65.568	I-75 – Dayton, Toledo	Exit 127 (I-75)
Hardin	Ada	54.248	87.304	SR 235 (North Main Street)	
Hardin	Dunkirk	64.372	103.597	US 68 (South Main Street)	
Hardin	Patterson	70.489	113.441	SR 53 (Kenton Street) / Main Street	
1.000 mi = 1.609 km; 1.000 km = 0.621 mi: Concurrency terminus
