= Hoaglin (disambiguation) =

Hoaglin may refer to:

- Hoaglin, Ohio, unincorporated community in Ohio, United States
- Hoaglin Township, Van Wert County, Ohio, township of Van Wert County, Ohio, United States
- Fred Hoaglin, former center in the NFL who played from 1966 to 1976
