= Seamersville, Ohio =

Unincorporated community in Ohio, U.S.

Coordinates: 40°55′56″N 84°25′01″W

Seamersville is an unincorporated community within the Township of Jackson, a division of Van Wert County, in the U.S. state of Ohio.

== History ==
A post office called Seamersville was in operation from 1900 until 1903.
