= Dull, Ohio =

- Unincorporated community
- Location within Ohio Location within the United States
- Coordinates: 40°45′51″N 84°40′00″W
- Country: United States
- State: Ohio
- County: Van Wert
- Elevation: 824 ft (251 m)
- Time zone: UTC-5 (Eastern (EST))
  - Summer (DST): UTC-4 (EDT)
- Area codes: 419 & 567
- GNIS feature ID: 1064561

Dull is an unincorporated community in Liberty Township, Van Wert County, Ohio, United States. Dull is 2.50 miles (4.02 km) west-southwest of Ohio City.

== History ==
Dull was originally called McKee, and under the latter name was laid out in 1879 by J. M. Dull and others. A post office was established under the name Dull in 1880, and remained in operation until 1909. The community is sometimes called Dulltown.
