= Van Wert County Airport =

Airport in Van Wert, Ohio

- IATA: none; ICAO: KVNW; FAA LID: VNW

Summary
- Owner/Operator: Van Wert County, Ohio
- Serves: Van Wert, Ohio
- Location: Van Wert County, Ohio
- Built: 1930
- Time zone: UTC−05:00 (-5)
  - Summer (DST): UTC−04:00 (-4)
- Elevation AMSL: 787 ft (240 m)
- Coordinates: 40°51′53″N 084°36′35″W
- Website: www.vwairport.com

Map
- Location of airport in Ohio VNW (the United States)

Runways
Direction	Length		Surface
Direction	ft	m	Surface
9/27	5,000	1,219	Asphalt

Statistics (2020)
- Aircraft movements: 27,375

The Van Wert County Airport (ICAO: KVNW, FAA LID: VNW) (Note: The airport formerly used the FAA location identifier 6G0.) is a publicly owned, public use airport located 2 miles southwest of Van Wert in Van Wert County, Ohio. The airport is primarily a general aviation facility and serves small, privately owned aircraft.

The airport hosts a regular fly in/cruise in with planes, cars, and motorcycles on display.

== History ==
The airport was dedicated on 24 June 1928.

The Souslin Flying Service opened a location at the airport in March 1938. A contract for the construction of a 2,880-square-foot (268 m^{2}) cement block hangar was awarded in late June 1939. By late August, the airport had two runways on about 100 acres (40 ha) of land.

A severe storm on 19 March 1948 seriously damaged the airport and fourteen airplanes located there.

By early October 1951, the city had purchased 350 acres (140 ha) and a new 2,000-foot (610 m) paved runway was under construction. It was in use by late June of the following year. However, by 1958, this was viewed as too short and a longer runway was requested. The airport was almost relocated further west in the early 1960s, but the death of the airport manager in an air racing crash prevented the move. Instead, the runway was extended to 3,200 feet (980 m) in 1962.

Lakefield Aviation assumed the lease for the airport in early March 1967. A plan to add another 1,300 feet (400 m) was announced in December 1967. Due to the impending loss of a grant by Paulding County, a joint airport near the county line was suggested by a member of that county's airport authority in late July 1968. After failing to obtain a $100,000 grant from the state in years prior, in late September 1970 the city began considering applying for an FAA matching grant to extend the runway to at least 3,500 feet (1,100 m). This would, in turn, make the airport eligible for a $50,000 state grant.

By mid June 1971, approximately 30 residents that were worried expansion might result in the loss of trees close to their property proposed purchasing a strip of land from the airport. By 1972, a group of citizens opposed to expanding the airport in its existing location had arisen. (Note: The group subsequently placed anti-expansion advertisements in the local paper.) The city sued three local landowners in January 1973 to acquire their 40 acres (16 ha) for the airport and the following month was counter sued by a fourth individual whose 74 acres (30 ha) were also needed. After being initially denied by a judge, a restraining order preventing the city from purchasing land was upheld by the Third District Court of Appeals in mid September. In early November, citizens voted roughly two to one in favor of repealing an ordinance permitting expansion of the airport. The city council approved a runway extension to 3,500 feet (1,100 m), the paving of a ramp and other improvements in mid August 1974. A county airport authority was established in late December.

A proposal by the city to annex the airport was rejected by the county in late June 1999.

By mid October 2004, the runway had been extended to 4,000 feet (1,200 m). By 2005, the parallel taxiway had been extended to 3,000 feet (910 m) and an AWOS added.

The FBO's terminal building was upgraded in 2021. The project cost $1.6 million and was built with private funds. New facilities included classrooms, a new lounge, and space to stay overnight. In 2023, an airport expansion went up for debate, including a potential runway expansion in order to handle bigger jets. The airport pursued both public and private funding options to support the growth. Later in 2023, the airport received nearly $90,000 from the FAA to upgrade its lighting system. Relevant projects included reconstructing the runway lighting system, constructing a lighting vault to meet FAA standards, and installing replacement runway end identifier lights to make the airport more accessible by improving approaches to the runway. The runway was lengthened to 5,005 feet (1,526 m) in 2025.

== Facilities and aircraft ==
=== Facilities ===
The airport has two runways. Runway 9/27 measures 4,000 x 75 ft (1219 x 23 m) and is paved with asphalt; runway 18/36 measures 2558 x 95 ft (780 x 29 m) and is made of turf.

The airport has a county-operated fixed-base operator. It sells fuel, both Avgas and Jet A; offers services such as general maintenance, catering, hangars, courtesy transportation, and rental cars; and provides amenities such as conference rooms, pilot supplies, a crew lounge, snooze rooms, and showers.

The airport partners with Purdue University to be a satellite training facility for aviation, allowing students to earn credits towards a degree.

=== Aircraft ===
For the 12-month period ending September 24, 2020, the airport had 27,375 aircraft operations, an average of 75 per day; it was entirely general aviation. For the same time period, 22 aircraft were based at the airport: 20 single-engine airplanes, 1 multi-engine airplane, and 1 jet.
