= Cavett, Ohio =

Unincorporated community in Ohio, U.S.

Coordinates: 40°56′47″N 84°34′53″W

Cavett is an unincorporated community in Van Wert County, in the U.S. state of Ohio.

== History ==
A post office called Cavett was established in 1881, and remained in operation until 1918. Cavett was the name of a local family of pioneer settlers.
