= Hoaglin, Ohio =

Unincorporated community in Ohio, U.S.

Coordinates: 40°56′46″N 84°29′42″W

Hoaglin is an unincorporated community in Van Wert County, in the U.S. state of Ohio.

== History ==
A post office called Hoaglin was established in 1886, and remained in operation until 1904. Hoaglin Township derives its name from the local Hoaglin family.
