= Jonestown, Van Wert County, Ohio =

Unincorporated community in Ohio, U.S.

Coordinates: 40°46′17″N 84°30′50″W

Jonestown is an unincorporated community in Van Wert County, in the U.S. state of Ohio.

== History ==
Jonestown was founded in 1886. A large share of the first settlers having the surname Jones caused the name to be selected. A variant name was Tokio. A post office called Tokio was established in 1880, and remained in operation until 1950.
