= Schumm, Ohio =

Unincorporated community in Ohio, U.S.

Coordinates: 40°45′23″N 84°43′39″W

Schumm is an unincorporated community in Van Wert County, in the U.S. state of Ohio.

== History ==
A post office called Schumm was established in 1881, and remained in operation until 1953. The namesake Schumm family settled the area in 1837.
