= Dixon, Indiana and Ohio =

Unincorporated community in Indiana and Ohio, US

Coordinates: 40°57′0″N 84°48′11″W

Dixon is an unincorporated community in Allen County, Indiana and Van Wert County, Ohio.

== History ==
Dixon was laid out around 1854. A post office was established on the town's Ohio side in 1855, where it was in operation until 1958.
