= Willshire Township, Van Wert County, Ohio =

Township in Ohio, US

- Township
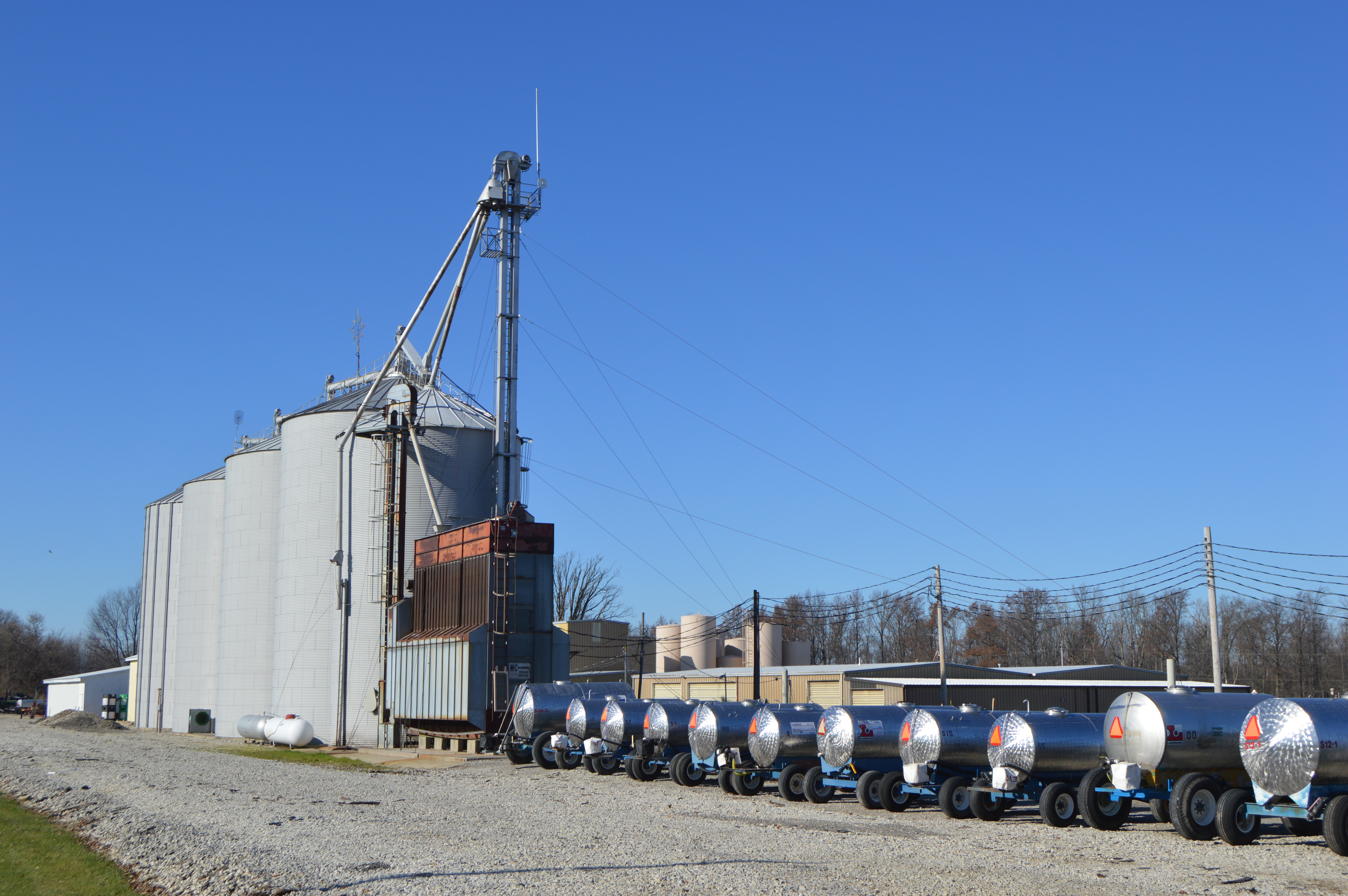
- Grain elevator at Glenmore

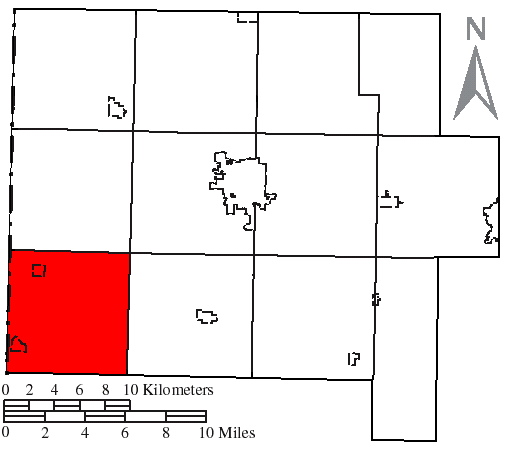
- Location of Willshire Township in Van Wert County
- Coordinates: 40°46′31″N 84°45′23″W
- Country: United States
- State: Ohio
- County: Van Wert

Area
  - Total: 35.8 sq mi (92.6 km^{2})
  - Land: 35.7 sq mi (92.5 km^{2})
  - Water: 0 sq mi (0.0 km^{2})
- Elevation: 830 ft (253 m)

Population (2020)
  - Total: 1,652
  - Density: 46.3/sq mi (17.9/km^{2})
- Time zone: UTC-5 (Eastern (EST))
  - Summer (DST): UTC-4 (EDT)
- ZIP code: 45898
- Area code: 419
- FIPS code: 39-85750
- GNIS feature ID: 1087097

Willshire Township is one of the twelve townships of Van Wert County, Ohio, United States. The 2020 census found 1,652 people in the township.

== Geography ==
Located in the southwestern corner of the county along the Indiana line, it borders the following townships:

- Harrison Township - north
- Pleasant Township - northeast corner
- Liberty Township - east
- Dublin Township, Mercer County - southeast corner
- Black Creek Township, Mercer County - south
- Blue Creek Township, Adams County, Indiana - southwest
- St. Marys Township, Adams County, Indiana - west

Two villages are located in Willshire Township: Willshire in the southwest, and Wren in the northwest. The unincorporated communities of Abanaka and Glenmore lie in the township's east.

== Name and history ==
It is the only Willshire Township statewide.

== Government ==
The township is governed by a three-member board of trustees, who are elected in November of odd-numbered years to a four-year term beginning on the following January 1. Two are elected in the year after the presidential election and one is elected in the year before it. There is also an elected township fiscal officer, who serves a four-year term beginning on April 1 of the year after the election, which is held in November of the year before the presidential election. Vacancies in the fiscal officership or on the board of trustees are filled by the remaining trustees.
