= Glenmore, Ohio =

Unincorporated community in Ohio, U.S.

Coordinates: 40°47′05″N 84°41′54″W

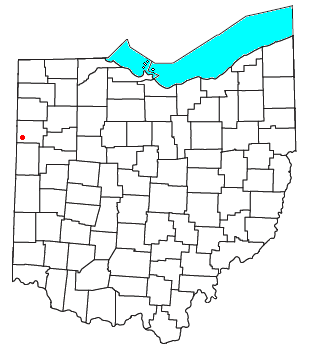
Location of Glenmore, Ohio

Glenmore is an unincorporated community in eastern Willshire Township, Van Wert County, Ohio, United States. It lies at the intersection of the north-south Glenmore Road with the east-west Glenmore Road. Twentyseven Mile Creek, a subsidiary of the St. Marys River, runs on the western edge of Glenmore after rising a short distance to the south of the community. It is located 8½ miles (13¾ kilometers) southwest of Van Wert, the county seat of Van Wert County.

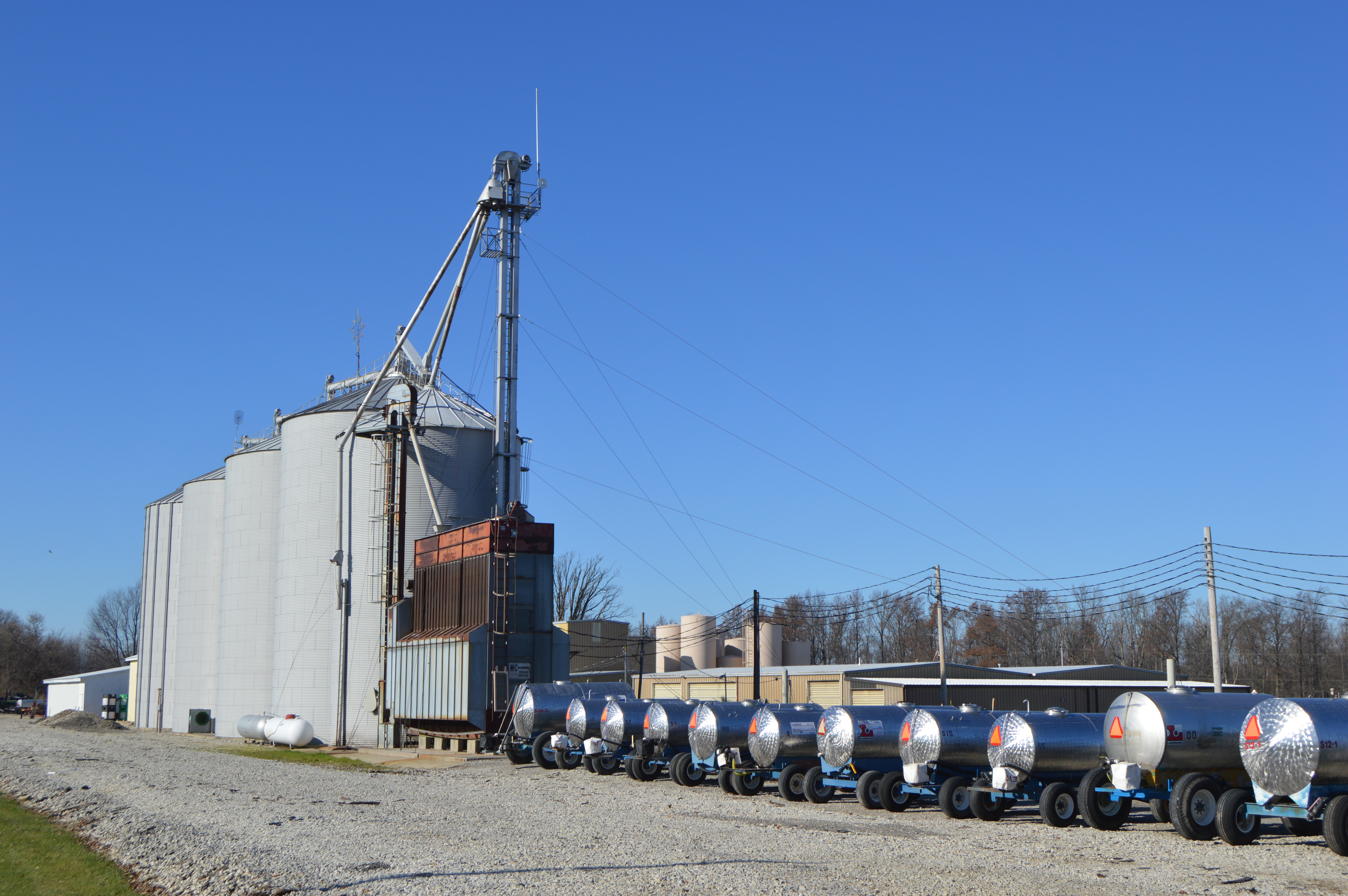
Grain elevator at Glenmore
