= Union Township, Van Wert County, Ohio =

Township in Ohio, US

- Township
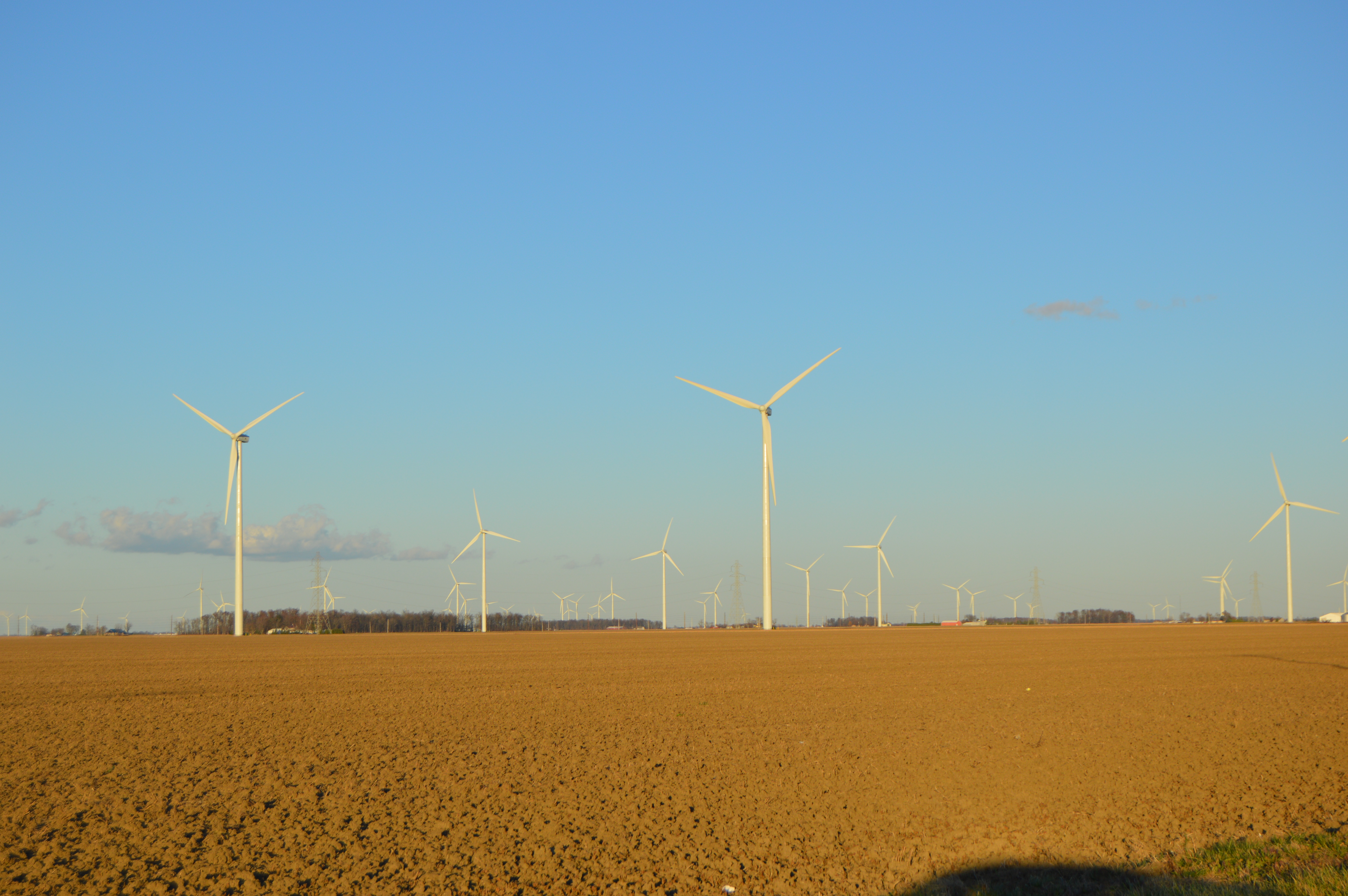
- Fields and a wind farm just east of Convoy

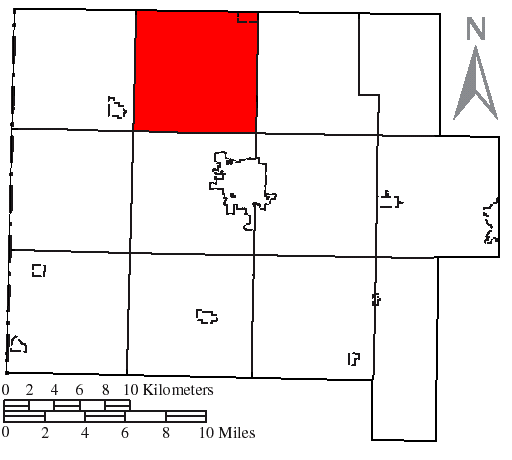
- Location of Union Township in Van Wert County
- Coordinates: 40°57′3″N 84°37′13″W
- Country: United States
- State: Ohio
- County: Van Wert

Area
  - Total: 36.5 sq mi (94.5 km^{2})
  - Land: 36.5 sq mi (94.5 km^{2})
  - Water: 0 sq mi (0.0 km^{2})
- Elevation: 751 ft (229 m)

Population (2020)
  - Total: 946
  - Density: 25.9/sq mi (10.0/km^{2})
- Time zone: UTC-5 (Eastern (EST))
  - Summer (DST): UTC-4 (EDT)
- FIPS code: 39-78596
- GNIS feature ID: 1087095

Union Township is one of the twelve townships of Van Wert County, Ohio, United States. The 2020 census found 946 people in the township.

== Geography ==
Located in the northern part of the county, it borders the following townships:

- Blue Creek Township, Paulding County - north
- Latty Township, Paulding County - northeast corner
- Hoaglin Township - east
- Ridge Township - southeast corner
- Pleasant Township - south
- Harrison Township - southwest corner
- Tully Township - west
- Benton Township, Paulding County - northwest corner

Part of the village of Scott is located in northwestern Union Township, along the border with Paulding County.

== Name and history ==
It is one of twenty-seven Union Townships statewide.

== Government ==
The township is governed by a three-member board of trustees, who are elected in November of odd-numbered years to a four-year term beginning on the following January 1. Two are elected in the year after the presidential election and one is elected in the year before it. There is also an elected township fiscal officer, who serves a four-year term beginning on April 1 of the year after the election, which is held in November of the year before the presidential election. Vacancies in the fiscal officership or on the board of trustees are filled by the remaining trustees.
