= Pleasant Township, Van Wert County, Ohio =

Township in Ohio, US

- Township
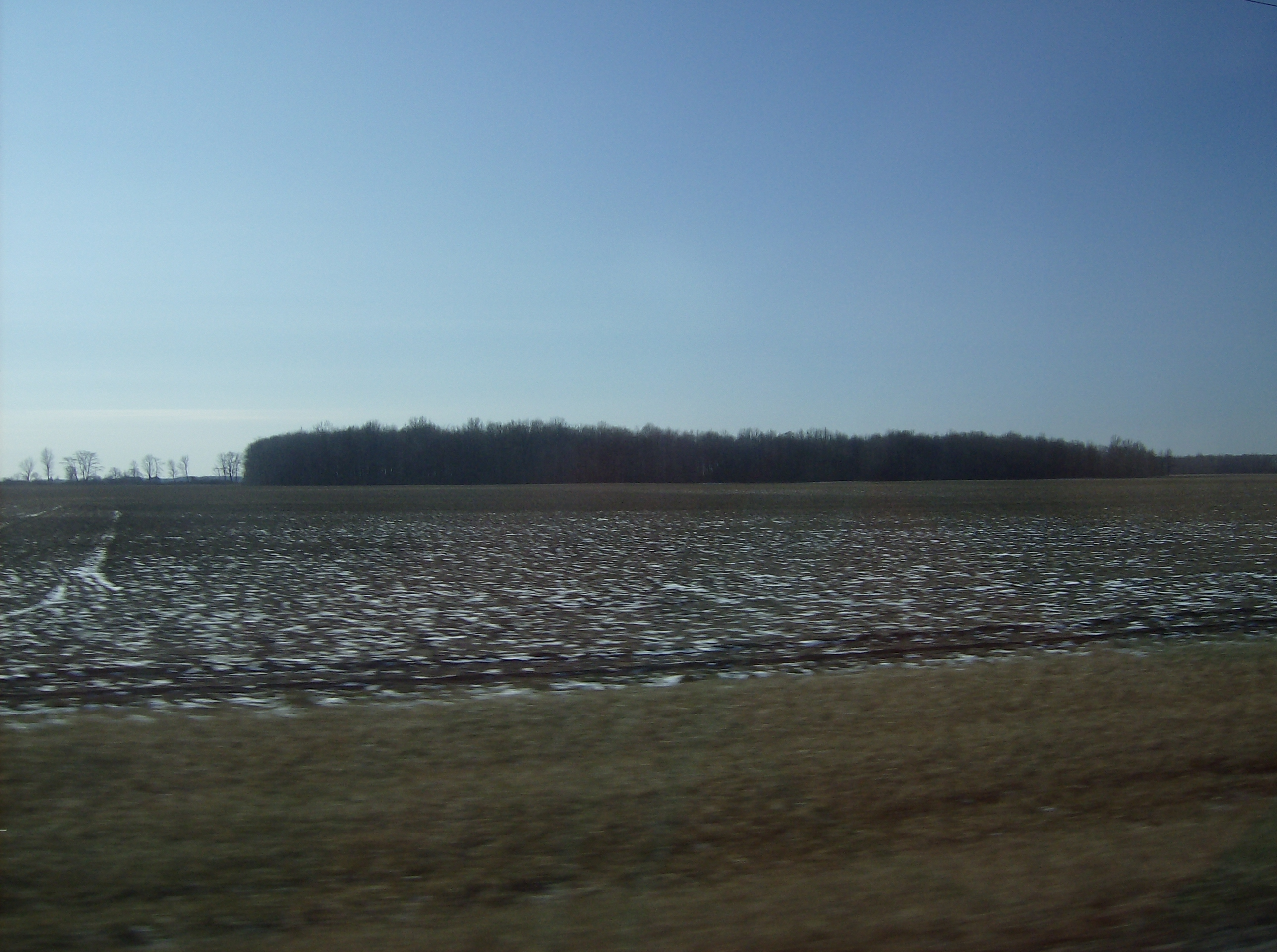
- Winter scene on U.S. Route 224 west of Van Wert

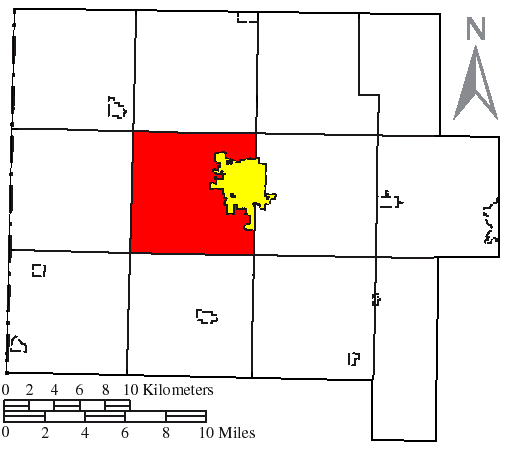
- Location of Pleasant Township (red) in Van Wert County, next to the city of Van Wert (yellow)
- Coordinates: 40°52′6″N 84°35′52″W
- Country: United States
- State: Ohio
- County: Van Wert

Area
  - Total: 36.8 sq mi (95.4 km^{2})
  - Land: 36.6 sq mi (94.8 km^{2})
  - Water: 0.23 sq mi (0.6 km^{2})
- Elevation: 781 ft (238 m)

Population (2020)
  - Total: 10,928
  - Density: 299/sq mi (115.3/km^{2})
- Time zone: UTC-5 (Eastern (EST))
  - Summer (DST): UTC-4 (EDT)
- FIPS code: 39-63408
- GNIS feature ID: 1087092
- Website: https://www.pleasanttownshipvw.com/

Pleasant Township is one of the twelve townships of Van Wert County, Ohio, United States. The 2020 census found 10,928 people in the township.

== Geography ==
Located in the central part of the county, it borders the following townships:

- Union Township—north
- Hoaglin Township—northeast corner
- Ridge Township—east
- York Township—southeast corner
- Liberty Township—south
- Willshire Township—southwest corner
- Harrison Township—west
- Tully Township—northwest corner

The majority of the city of Van Wert, the county seat and largest city of Van Wert County, is located in the eastern half of Pleasant Township.

Pleasant Township is one of only two county townships (the other being Ridge Township) without a border on another county.

== Name and history ==
It is one of fifteen Pleasant Townships statewide.

== Government ==
The township is governed by a three-member board of trustees, who are elected in November of odd-numbered years to a four-year term beginning on the following January 1. Two are elected in the year after the presidential election and one is elected in the year before it. There is also an elected township fiscal officer, who serves a four-year term beginning on April 1 of the year after the election, which is held in November of the year before the presidential election. Vacancies in the fiscal officership or on the board of trustees are filled by the remaining trustees.
