= Harrison Township, Van Wert County, Ohio =

Township in Ohio, US

- Township
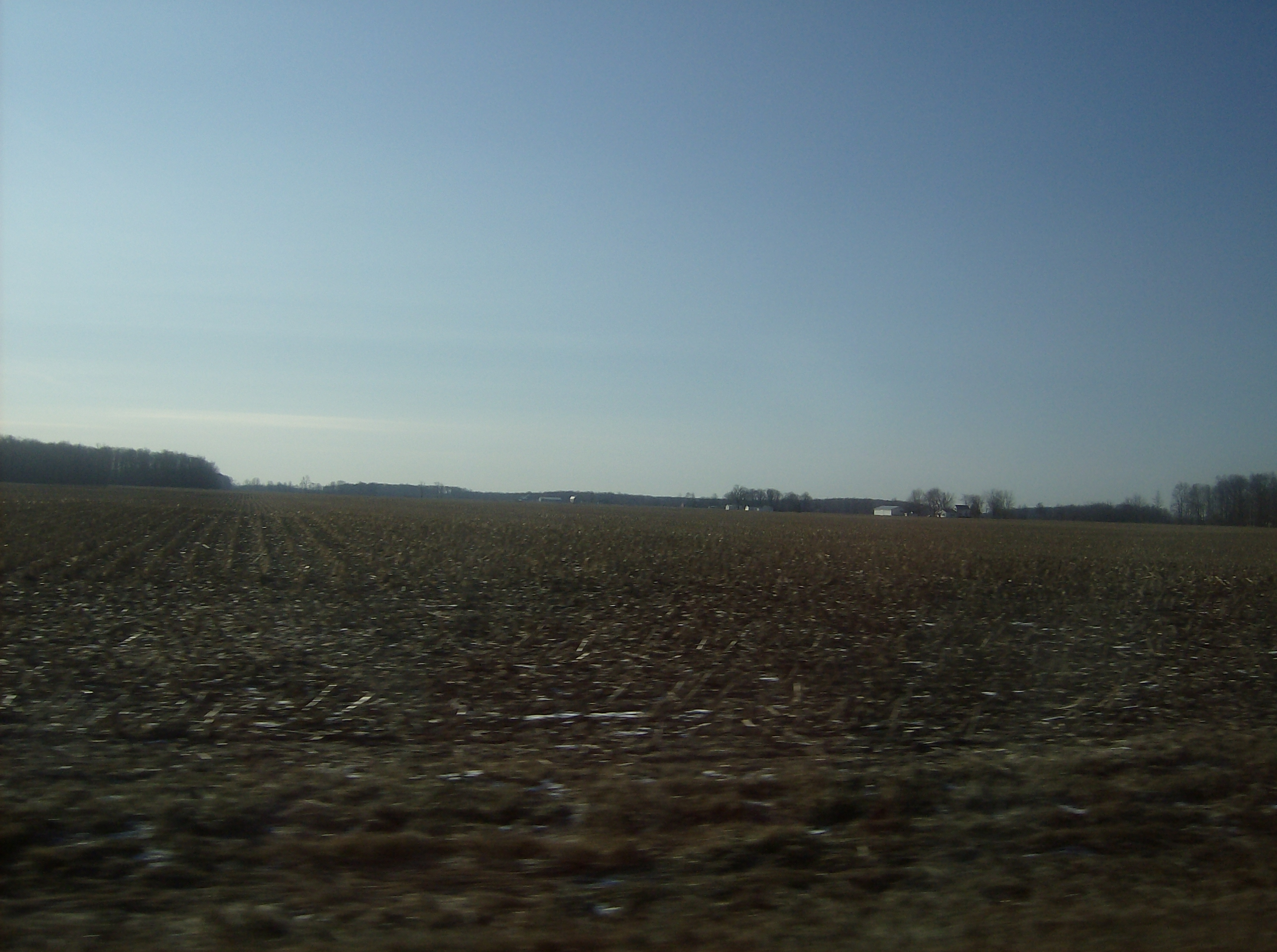
- Fields on U.S. Route 224 just east of Indiana

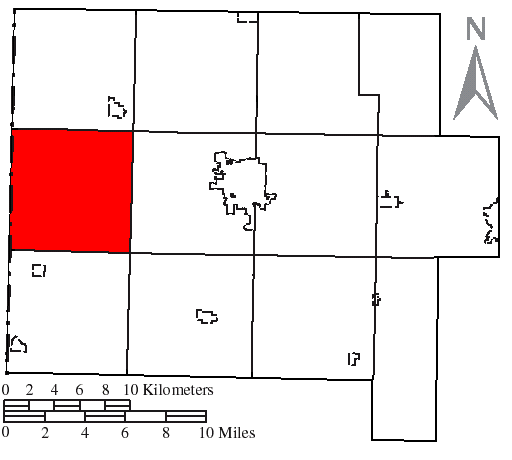
- Location of Harrison Township in Van Wert County
- Coordinates: 40°51′57″N 84°45′3″W
- Country: United States
- State: Ohio
- County: Van Wert

Area
  - Total: 36.0 sq mi (93.2 km^{2})
  - Land: 36.0 sq mi (93.2 km^{2})
  - Water: 0 sq mi (0.0 km^{2})
- Elevation: 810 ft (247 m)

Population (2020)
  - Total: 1,020
  - Density: 28.3/sq mi (10.9/km^{2})
- Time zone: UTC-5 (Eastern (EST))
  - Summer (DST): UTC-4 (EDT)
- FIPS code: 39-34034
- GNIS feature ID: 1087087

Harrison Township is one of the twelve townships of Van Wert County, Ohio, United States. The 2020 census found 1,020 people in the township.

== Geography ==
Located in the western part of the county along the Indiana line, it borders the following townships:

- Tully Township - north
- Union Township - northeast corner
- Pleasant Township - east
- Liberty Township - southeast corner
- Willshire Township - south
- St. Marys Township, Adams County, Indiana - southwest
- Union Township, Adams County, Indiana - west

No municipalities are located within Harrison Township.

== Name and history ==
It is one of nineteen Harrison Townships statewide.

== Government ==
The township is governed by a three-member board of trustees, who are elected in November of odd-numbered years to a four-year term beginning on the following January 1. Two are elected in the year after the presidential election and one is elected in the year before it. There is also an elected township fiscal officer, who serves a four-year term beginning on April 1 of the year after the election, which is held in November of the year before the presidential election. Vacancies in the fiscal officership or on the board of trustees are filled by the remaining trustees.
