= Abanaka, Ohio =

- Unincorporated community
- Location within Ohio Location within the United States
- Coordinates: 40°45′36″N 84°41′54″W
- Country: United States
- State: Ohio
- County: Van Wert
- Elevation: 830 ft (250 m)
- Time zone: UTC-5 (Eastern (EST))
  - Summer (DST): UTC-4 (EDT)
- Postal code: 45874
- Area codes: 419 & 567
- GNIS feature ID: 1048447

Abanaka is an unincorporated community in Van Wert County, in the U.S. state of Ohio.

== History ==
A post office called Abanaka was established in 1880, and remained in operation until 1906. Abanaka is a name derived from a Native American language meaning "easterner".
