= Washington Township, Van Wert County, Ohio =

Township in Ohio, US

- Township
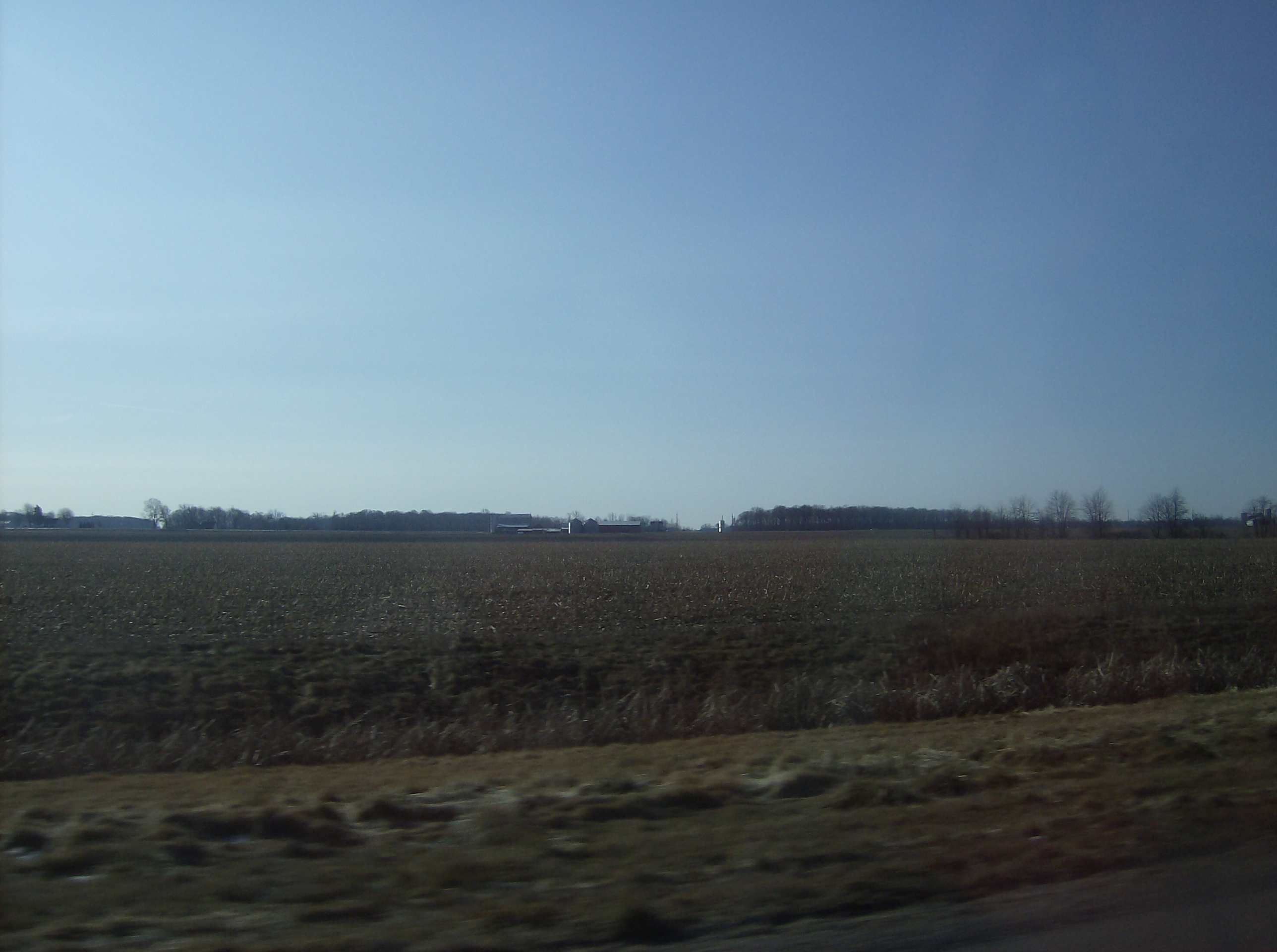
- Farmland in west-central Washington Township

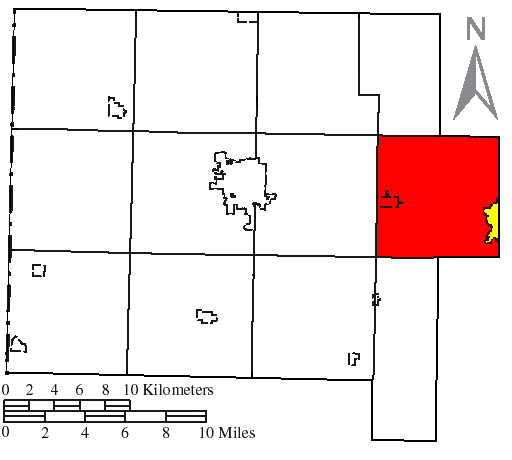
- Location of Washington Township (red) in Van Wert County, next to the city of Delphos (yellow)
- Coordinates: 40°50′52″N 84°22′41″W
- Country: United States
- State: Ohio
- County: Van Wert

Area
  - Total: 36.7 sq mi (95.1 km^{2})
  - Land: 36.7 sq mi (95.0 km^{2})
  - Water: 0.039 sq mi (0.1 km^{2})
- Elevation: 771 ft (235 m)

Population (2020)
  - Total: 5,126
  - Density: 140/sq mi (54/km^{2})
- Time zone: UTC-5 (Eastern (EST))
  - Summer (DST): UTC-4 (EDT)
- FIPS code: 39-81676
- GNIS feature ID: 1087096
- Website: https://www.washingtontwpvw.com/

Washington Township is one of the twelve townships of Van Wert County, Ohio, United States. The 2020 census found 5,126 people in the township.

== Geography ==
Located in the eastern part of the county, it borders the following townships:

- Jackson Township - north
- Monterey Township, Putnam County - northeast
- Jennings Township, Putnam County - east
- Marion Township, Allen County - southeast
- Jennings Township - south
- York Township - southwest corner
- Ridge Township - west
- Hoaglin Township - northwest corner

Part of the city of Delphos is located in southeastern Washington Township, along the border with Allen County, and the village of Middle Point is located in the western part of the township.

Van Wert County's farthest eastern point is located in Washington Township.

== Name and history ==
It is one of forty-three Washington Townships statewide.

== Government ==
The township is governed by a three-member board of trustees, who are elected in November of odd-numbered years to a four-year term beginning on the following January 1. Two are elected in the year after the presidential election and one is elected in the year before it. There is also an elected township fiscal officer, who serves a four-year term beginning on April 1 of the year after the election, which is held in November of the year before the presidential election. Vacancies in the fiscal officership or on the board of trustees are filled by the remaining trustees.
