= Tully Township, Van Wert County, Ohio =

Township in Ohio, US

- Township
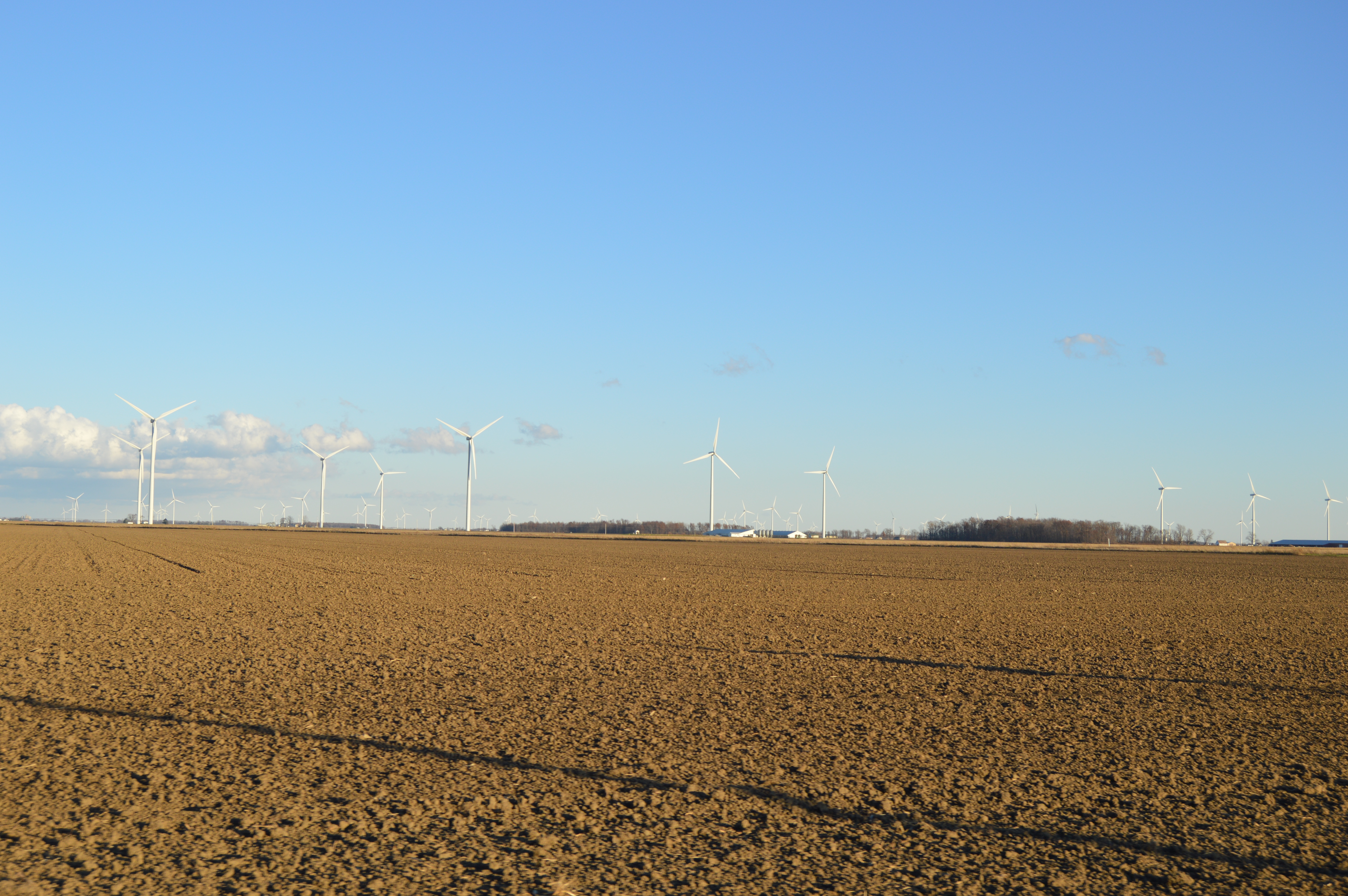
- Fields and wind turbines in the township's far northeast

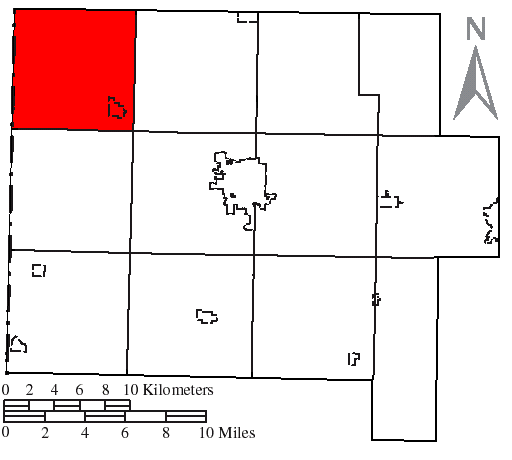
- Location of Tully Township in Van Wert County
- Coordinates: 40°56′19″N 84°44′10″W
- Country: United States
- State: Ohio
- County: Van Wert

Area
  - Total: 36.1 sq mi (93.6 km^{2})
  - Land: 36.1 sq mi (93.6 km^{2})
  - Water: 0 sq mi (0.0 km^{2})
- Elevation: 781 ft (238 m)

Population (2020)
  - Total: 2,013
  - Density: 55.7/sq mi (21.5/km^{2})
- Time zone: UTC-5 (Eastern (EST))
  - Summer (DST): UTC-4 (EDT)
- FIPS code: 39-77756
- GNIS feature ID: 1087094

Tully Township is one of the twelve townships of Van Wert County, Ohio, United States. The 2020 census found 2,013 people in the township.

== Geography ==
Located in the northwestern corner of the county along the Indiana line, it borders the following townships:

- Benton Township, Paulding County - north
- Blue Creek Township, Paulding County - northeast corner
- Union Township - east
- Pleasant Township - southeast corner
- Harrison Township - south
- Union Township, Adams County, Indiana - southwest
- Monroe Township, Allen County, Indiana - west

The village of Convoy is located in southeastern Tully Township.

== Name and history ==
Statewide, the only other Tully Township is located in Marion County.

== Government ==
The township is governed by a three-member board of trustees, who are elected in November of odd-numbered years to a four-year term beginning on the following January 1. Two are elected in the year after the presidential election and one is elected in the year before it. There is also an elected township fiscal officer, who serves a four-year term beginning on April 1 of the year after the election, which is held in November of the year before the presidential election. Vacancies in the fiscal officership or on the board of trustees are filled by the remaining trustees.
