= York Township, Van Wert County, Ohio =

Township in Ohio, US

- Township
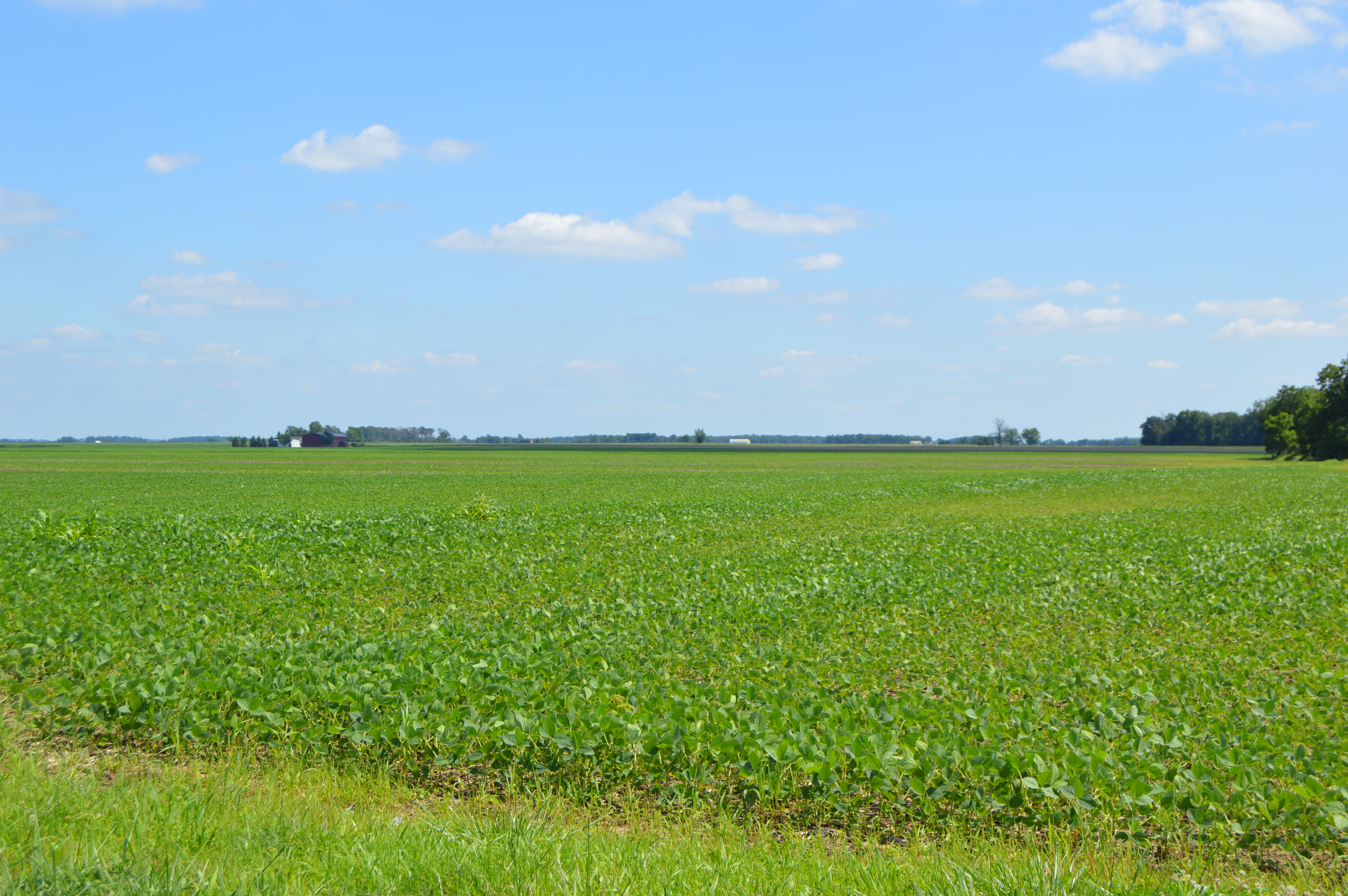
- Fields between Venedocia and Elgin

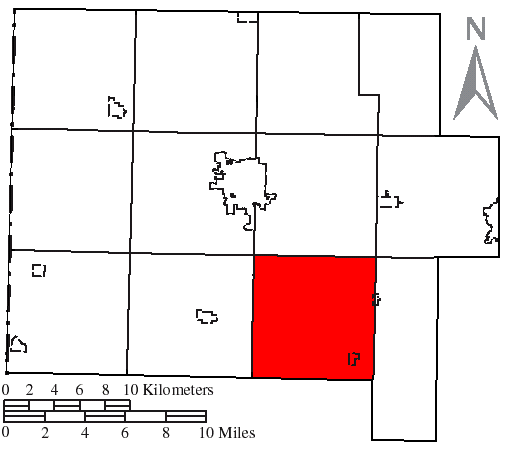
- Location of York Township in Van Wert County
- Coordinates: 40°45′38″N 84°30′13″W
- Country: United States
- State: Ohio
- County: Van Wert

Area
  - Total: 36.4 sq mi (94.4 km^{2})
  - Land: 36.4 sq mi (94.4 km^{2})
  - Water: 0 sq mi (0.0 km^{2})
- Elevation: 810 ft (247 m)

Population (2020)
  - Total: 768
  - Density: 21.1/sq mi (8.14/km^{2})
- Time zone: UTC-5 (Eastern (EST))
  - Summer (DST): UTC-4 (EDT)
- FIPS code: 39-87136
- GNIS feature ID: 1087098

York Township is one of the twelve townships of Van Wert County, Ohio, United States. The 2020 census found 768 people in the township.

== Geography ==
Located in the southern part of the county, it borders the following townships:

- Ridge Township - north
- Washington Township - northeast corner
- Jennings Township - east
- Union Township, Mercer County - south
- Dublin Township, Mercer County - southwest corner
- Liberty Township - west
- Pleasant Township - northwest corner

Two villages are located in York Township: Elgin in the southeast, and part of Venedocia in the northeast, along the border with Jennings Township.

== Name and history ==
It is one of ten York Townships statewide.

== Government ==
The township is governed by a three-member board of trustees, who are elected in November of odd-numbered years to a four-year term beginning on the following January 1. Two are elected in the year after the presidential election and one is elected in the year before it. There is also an elected township fiscal officer, who serves a four-year term beginning on April 1 of the year after the election, which is held in November of the year before the presidential election. Vacancies in the fiscal officership or on the board of trustees are filled by the remaining trustees.
