= Ridge Township, Van Wert County, Ohio =

Township in Ohio, US

- Township
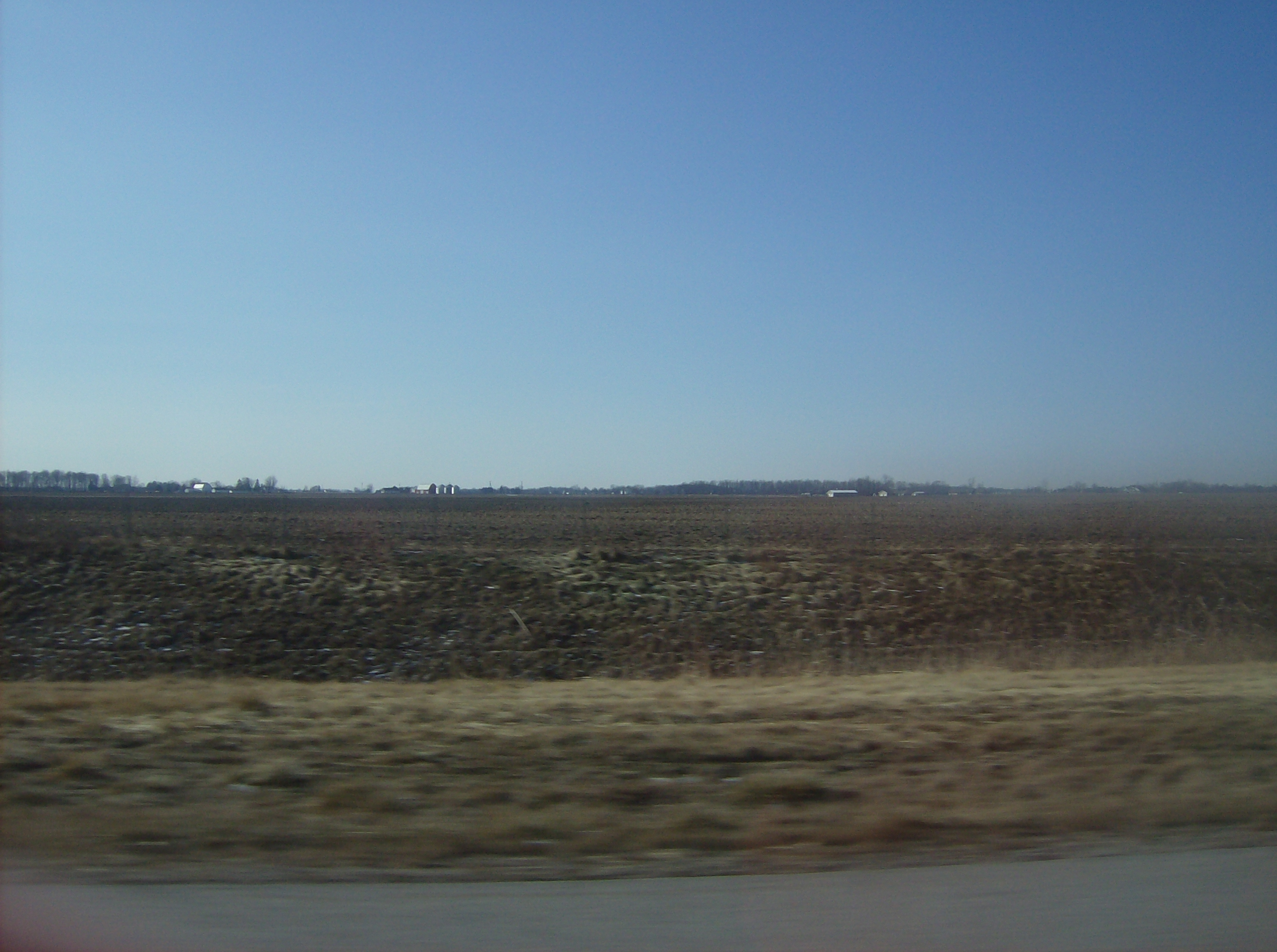
- Much of Ridge Township is flat farmland

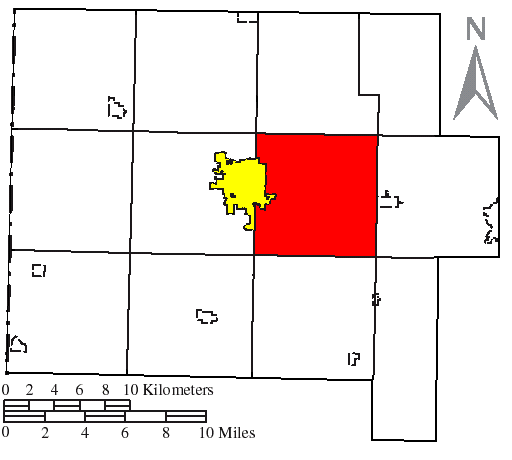
- Location of Ridge Township (red) in Van Wert County, next to the city of Van Wert (yellow)
- Coordinates: 40°51′56″N 84°32′4″W
- Country: United States
- State: Ohio
- County: Van Wert

Area
  - Total: 36.4 sq mi (94.2 km^{2})
  - Land: 36.3 sq mi (93.9 km^{2})
  - Water: 0.12 sq mi (0.3 km^{2})
- Elevation: 790 ft (240 m)

Population (2020)
  - Total: 3,309
  - Density: 91/sq mi (35.2/km^{2})
- Time zone: UTC-5 (Eastern (EST))
  - Summer (DST): UTC-4 (EDT)
- FIPS code: 39-66978
- GNIS feature ID: 1087093

Ridge Township is one of the twelve townships of Van Wert County, Ohio, United States. The 2020 census found 3,309 people in the township.

== Geography ==
Located in the central part of the county, it borders the following townships:

- Hoaglin Township - north
- Jackson Township - northeast corner
- Washington Township - east
- Jennings Township - southeast corner
- York Township - south
- Liberty Township - southwest corner
- Pleasant Township - west
- Union Township - northwest corner

Part of the city of Van Wert, the county seat and largest city of Van Wert County, is located in the western half of Ridge Township.

Ridge Township is one of only two county townships (the other being Pleasant Township) without a border on another county.

== Name and history ==
Statewide, the only other Ridge Township is located in Wyandot County.

== Government ==
The township is governed by a three-member board of trustees, who are elected in November of odd-numbered years to a four-year term beginning on the following January 1. Two are elected in the year after the presidential election and one is elected in the year before it. There is also an elected township fiscal officer, who serves a four-year term beginning on April 1 of the year after the election, which is held in November of the year before the presidential election. Vacancies in the fiscal officership or on the board of trustees are filled by the remaining trustees.
