= Middle Point, Ohio =

- Village
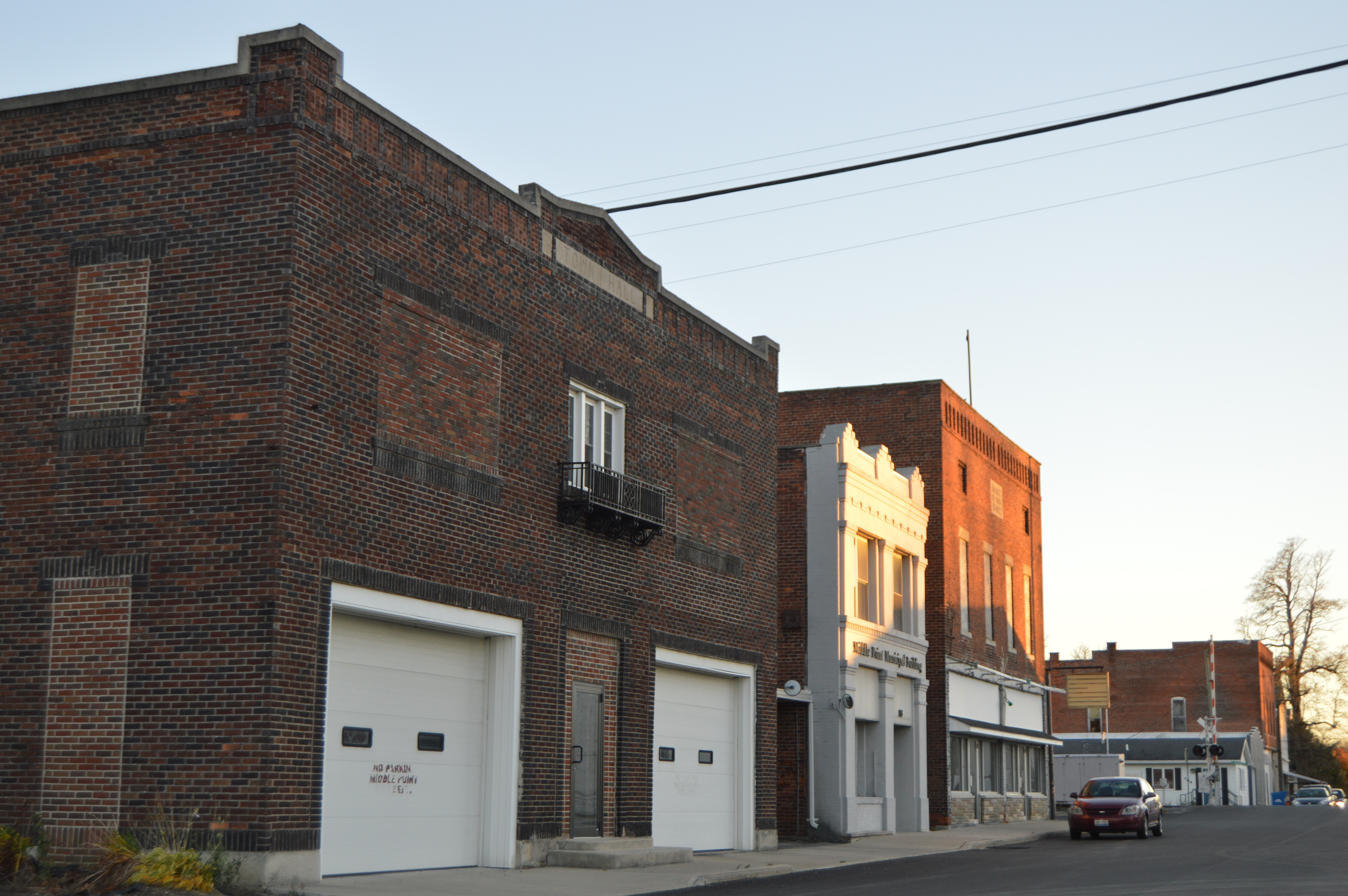
- Adams Street downtown

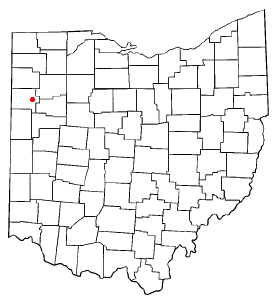
- Location of Middle Point, Ohio

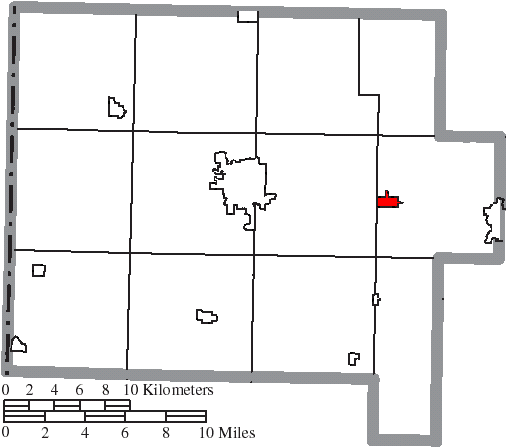
- Location of Middle Point in Van Wert County
- Coordinates: 40°51′20″N 84°26′46″W
- Country: United States
- State: Ohio
- County: Van Wert
- Township: Washington

Area
  - Total: 0.55 sq mi (1.43 km^{2})
  - Land: 0.54 sq mi (1.41 km^{2})
  - Water: 0.0077 sq mi (0.02 km^{2})
- Elevation: 778 ft (237 m)

Population (2020)
  - Total: 566
  - Density: 1,040.3/sq mi (401.65/km^{2})
- Time zone: UTC-5 (Eastern (EST))
  - Summer (DST): UTC-4 (EDT)
- ZIP code: 45863
- Area code: 419
- FIPS code: 39-49728
- GNIS feature ID: 2399331
- Website: http://www.villageofmiddlepoint.com/

Middle Point is a village in Van Wert County, Ohio, United States. The population was 566 at the 2020 census. It is included within the Van Wert, Ohio Micropolitan Statistical Area.

== History ==
Middle Point was laid out in 1851. The town's original name was Sykestown, after the Sykes family whom originally owned the land in the mid 19th century. The village was later renamed Middle Point for its relatively central location between Delphos and Van Wert. A post office has been in operation at Middle Point since 1854. Middle Point was incorporated as a village in 1874.

== Geography ==
According to the United States Census Bureau, the village has a total area of 0.57 square miles (1.48 km^{2}), of which 0.56 square miles (1.45 km^{2}) is land and 0.01 square miles (0.03 km^{2}) is water.

== Demographics ==
Historical population
Census	Pop.	Note	%±
1870	119		—
1880	442		271.4%
1890	432		−2.3%
1900	604		39.8%
1910	607		0.5%
1920	670		10.4%
1930	574		−14.3%
1940	586		2.1%
1950	583		−0.5%
1960	571		−2.1%
1970	543		−4.9%
1980	709		30.6%
1990	639		−9.9%
2000	593		−7.2%
2010	576		−2.9%
2020	566		−1.7%
U.S. Decennial Census

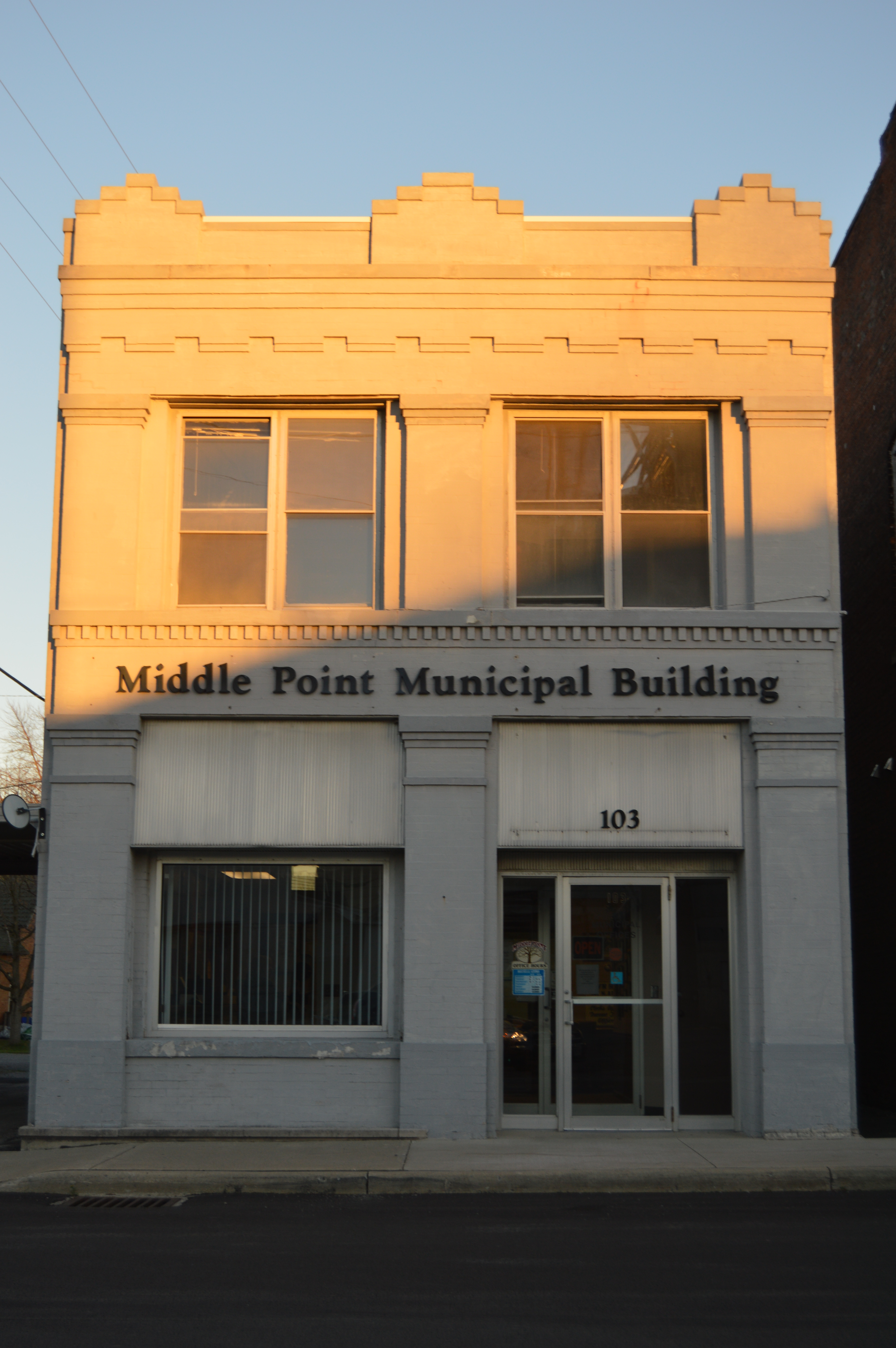
Middle Point Municipal building

=== 2010 census ===
As of the census of 2010, there were 576 people, 227 households, and 158 families living in the village. The population density was 1,028.6 inhabitants per square mile (397.1/km^{2}). There were 256 housing units at an average density of 457.1 per square mile (176.5/km^{2}). The racial makeup of the village was 99.3% White, 0.2% from other races, and 0.5% from two or more races. Hispanic or Latino of any race were 0.7% of the population.

There were 227 households, of which 32.6% had children under the age of 18 living with them, 54.6% were married couples living together, 9.7% had a female householder with no husband present, 5.3% had a male householder with no wife present, and 30.4% were non-families. 26.0% of all households were made up of individuals, and 10.6% had someone living alone who was 65 years of age or older. The average household size was 2.54 and the average family size was 3.09.

The median age in the village was 39 years. 27.1% of residents were under the age of 18; 7.7% were between the ages of 18 and 24; 24.7% were from 25 to 44; 26.5% were from 45 to 64; and 14.2% were 65 years of age or older. The gender makeup of the village was 49.8% male and 50.2% female.

=== 2000 census ===
As of the census of 2000, there were 593 people, 232 households, and 167 families living in the village. The population density was 1,066.2 inhabitants per square mile (411.7/km^{2}). There were 252 housing units at an average density of 453.1 per square mile (174.9/km^{2}). The racial makeup of the village was 97.98% White, 0.67% from other races, and 1.35% from two or more races. Hispanic or Latino of any race were 1.69% of the population.

There were 232 households, out of which 31.0% had children under the age of 18 living with them, 57.3% were married couples living together, 11.2% had a female householder with no husband present, and 28.0% were non-families. 25.9% of all households were made up of individuals, and 11.2% had someone living alone who was 65 years of age or older. The average household size was 2.56 and the average family size was 3.04.

In the village, the population was spread out, with 26.8% under the age of 18, 7.3% from 18 to 24, 27.3% from 25 to 44, 27.2% from 45 to 64, and 11.5% who were 65 years of age or older. The median age was 36 years. For every 100 females there were 93.8 males. For every 100 females age 18 and over, there were 89.5 males.

The median income for a household in the village was $33,661, and the median income for a family was $37,279. Males had a median income of $31,429 versus $22,857 for females. The per capita income for the village was $15,278. About 4.4% of families and 4.9% of the population were below the poverty line, including 4.3% of those under age 18 and none of those age 65 or over.

== Education ==
Middle Point has a public library, a branch of the Brumback Library.
