= Van Wert County, Ohio =

County in Ohio, United States

- County
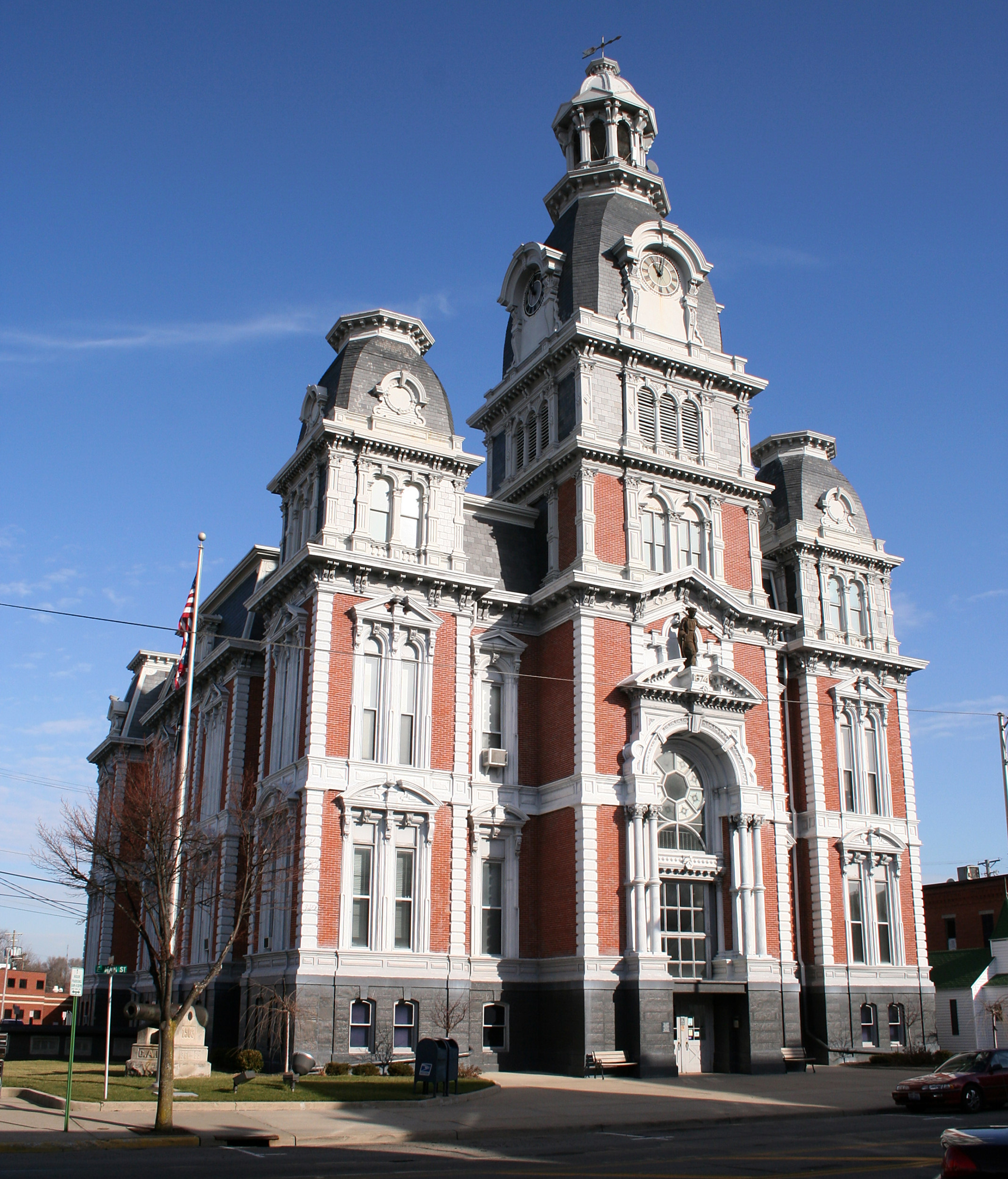
- Van Wert County Courthouse

- Flag Seal

- Location within the U.S. state of Ohio
- Coordinates: 40°52′N 84°35′W
- Country: United States
- State: Ohio
- Founded: February 12, 1820
- Named for: Isaac Van Wart
- Seat: Van Wert
- Largest city: Van Wert

Area
  - Total: 410 sq mi (1,100 km^{2})
  - Land: 409 sq mi (1,060 km^{2})
  - Water: 1.3 sq mi (3.4 km^{2}) 0.3%

Population (2020)
  - Total: 28,931
  - Estimate (2025): 29,013 ▲
  - Density: 71/sq mi (27/km^{2})
- Time zone: UTC−5 (Eastern)
  - Summer (DST): UTC−4 (EDT)
- Congressional district: 5th
- Website: www.vanwertcountyohio.gov

Van Wert County is a county located in the U.S. state of Ohio. As of the 2020 census, the population was 28,931. Its county seat is Van Wert. The county was created on February 12, 1820, and later organized on March 18, 1837. It is named for Isaac Van Wart, one of the captors of John André in the American Revolutionary War.

Van Wert County comprises the Van Wert, OH Micropolitan Statistical Area, which is included within the Lima–Van Wert–Celina, OH Combined Statistical Area.

== Geography ==
According to the U.S. Census Bureau, the county has a total area of 410 square miles (1,100 km^{2}), of which 409 square miles (1,060 km^{2}) is land and 1.3 square miles (3.4 km^{2}) (0.3%) is water.

=== Adjacent counties ===
- Paulding County (north)
- Putnam County (northeast)
- Allen County, Ohio (east)
- Auglaize County (southeast)
- Mercer County (south)
- Adams County, Indiana (southwest)
- Allen County, Indiana (northwest)

Van Wert County is one of the few counties in the US to border two counties of the same name in different states (Allen County in Ohio and Indiana).

== Demographics ==
Historical population
Census	Pop.	Note	%±
1830	49		—
1840	1,577		3,118.4%
1850	4,793		203.9%
1860	10,238		113.6%
1870	15,823		54.6%
1880	23,028		45.5%
1890	29,671		28.8%
1900	30,394		2.4%
1910	29,119		−4.2%
1920	28,210		−3.1%
1930	26,273		−6.9%
1940	26,759		1.8%
1950	26,971		0.8%
1960	28,840		6.9%
1970	29,194		1.2%
1980	30,458		4.3%
1990	30,464		0.0%
2000	29,659		−2.6%
2010	28,744		−3.1%
2020	28,931		0.7%
2025 (est.)	29,013	▲	0.3%
U.S. Decennial Census; 1790–1960 1900–1990; 1990–2000 2020

=== 2020 census ===
As of the 2020 census, the county had a population of 28,931 and a median age of 41.0 years. 23.7% of residents were under the age of 18 and 19.3% were 65 years of age or older. For every 100 females there were 98.5 males overall and 96.5 males for every 100 females age 18 and over.

As of the 2020 census, the racial makeup of the county was 92.7% White, 0.9% Black or African American, 0.2% American Indian and Alaska Native, 0.3% Asian, <0.1% Native Hawaiian and Pacific Islander, 1.6% from some other race, and 4.2% from two or more races. Hispanic or Latino residents of any race comprised 3.8% of the population.

According to the 2020 census, 49.6% of residents lived in urban areas while 50.4% lived in rural areas.

There were 11,589 households in the county, 29.4% of which had children under 18, 51.3% were married-couple households, 18.0% had a male householder with no spouse or partner present, and 23.3% had a female householder with no spouse or partner present. About 27.9% of households were made up of individuals and 13.1% had someone living alone who was 65 years of age or older. There were 12,540 housing units, of which 7.6% were vacant; among occupied units, 76.4% were owner-occupied and 23.6% were renter-occupied. The homeowner vacancy rate was 1.7% and the rental vacancy rate was 9.1%.

=== Racial and ethnic composition ===
Van Wert County, Ohio – Racial and ethnic composition Note: the US Census treats Hispanic/Latino as an ethnic category. This table excludes Latinos from the racial categories and assigns them to a separate category. Hispanics/Latinos may be of any race.
Race / ethnicity (NH = Non-Hispanic)	Pop 1980	Pop 1990	Pop 2000	Pop 2010	Pop 2020	% 1980	% 1990	% 2000	% 2010	% 2020
White alone (NH)	29,867	29,674	28,687	27,351	26,467	98.06%	97.41%	96.72%	95.15%	91.48%
Black or African American alone (NH)	113	187	222	237	257	0.37%	0.61%	0.75%	0.82%	0.89%
Native American or Alaska Native alone (NH)	25	28	31	36	37	0.08%	0.09%	0.10%	0.13%	0.13%
Asian alone (NH)	62	77	57	65	88	0.20%	0.25%	0.19%	0.23%	0.30%
Native Hawaiian or Pacific Islander alone (NH)	x	x	0	2	13	x	x	0.00%	0.01%	0.04%
Other race alone (NH)	15	16	28	13	79	0.05%	0.05%	0.09%	0.05%	0.27%
Mixed race or Multiracial (NH)	x	x	172	300	893	x	x	0.58%	1.04%	3.09%
Hispanic or Latino (any race)	376	482	462	740	1,097	1.23%	1.58%	1.56%	2.57%	3.79%
Total	30,458	30,464	29,659	28,744	28,931	100.00%	100.00%	100.00%	100.00%	100.00%

=== 2010 census ===
As of the 2010 United States census, there were 28,744 people, 11,439 households and 7,921 families living in the county. The population density was 70.3 inhabitants per square mile (27.1 inhabitants/km^{2}). There were 12,615 housing units at an average density of 30.8 units per square mile (11.9 units/km^{2}). The racial makeup of the county was 96.6% white, 0.9% black or African American, 0.2% Asian, 0.1% American Indian, 0.8% from other races, and 1.4% from two or more races. Those of Hispanic or Latino origin made up 2.6% of the population. In terms of ancestry, 43.6% were German, 12.4% were Irish, 11.5% were English and 11.0% were American.

Of the 11,439 households, 31.4% had children under the age of 18 living with them, 55.6% were married couples living together, 9.2% had a female householder with no husband present, 30.8% were non-families, and 26.6% of all households were made up of individuals. The average household size was 2.48 and the average family size was 2.98. The median age was 40.3 years.

The median income for a household in the county was $44,415 and the median income for a family was $51,215. Males had a median income of $37,408 versus $28,692 for females. The per capita income for the county was $20,772. About 6.1% of families and 8.8% of the population were below the poverty line, including 12.7% of those under age 18 and 6.6% of those age 65 or over.

=== 2000 census ===
As of the 2000 census, there were 29,659 people, 11,587 households and 8,354 families living in the county. The population density was 72 inhabitants per square mile (28 inhabitants/km^{2}). There were 12,363 housing units at an average density of 30 units per square mile (12/km^{2}). The racial makeup of the county was 97.43% White, 0.75% Black or African American, 0.11% Native American, 0.19% Asian, 0.75% from other races and 0.77% from two or more races. 1.56% of the population were Hispanic or Latino of any race.

There were 11,587 households, out of which 32.90% had children under the age of 18 living with them, 60.20% were married couples living together, 8.50% had a female householder with no husband present, and 27.90% were non-families. 24.70% of all households were made up of individuals, and 11.40% had someone living alone who was 65 years of age or older. The average household size was 2.52 and the average family size was 3.00.

In the county, the population was spread out, with 26.00% under the age of 18, 8.30% from 18 to 24, 27.30% from 25 to 44, 22.90% from 45 to 64, and 15.50% who were 65 years of age or older. The median age was 38 years. For every 100 females there were 95.50 males. For every 100 females age 18 and over, there were 92.40 males.

The median income for a household in the county was $39,497, and the median income for a family was $46,503. Males had a median income of $32,377 versus $23,859 for females. The per capita income for the county was $18,293. About 4.20% of families and 5.50% of the population were below the poverty line, including 5.80% of those under age 18 and 4.00% of those age 65 or over.

== Politics ==
Van Wert County is a stronghold Republican county in presidential elections. In 2020, Donald Trump nearly won 80% of the votes cast in the county.

United States presidential election results for Van Wert County, Ohio
Year	Republican		Democratic		Third party(ies)	
Year	No.	%	No.	%	No.	%
1856	758	48.01%	789	49.97%	32	2.03%
1860	1,015	50.93%	959	48.12%	19	0.95%
1864	1,214	50.44%	1,193	49.56%	0	0.00%
1868	1,547	51.95%	1,431	48.05%	0	0.00%
1872	1,805	51.62%	1,686	48.21%	6	0.17%
1876	2,290	48.64%	2,410	51.19%	8	0.17%
1880	2,634	50.51%	2,571	49.30%	10	0.19%
1884	3,052	50.43%	2,940	48.58%	60	0.99%
1888	3,411	48.18%	3,398	48.00%	270	3.81%
1892	3,373	46.52%	3,629	50.06%	248	3.42%
1896	3,957	49.26%	3,984	49.60%	92	1.15%
1900	4,006	52.18%	3,582	46.65%	90	1.17%
1904	4,120	54.08%	3,325	43.65%	173	2.27%
1908	3,809	49.28%	3,783	48.95%	137	1.77%
1912	2,490	35.04%	3,287	46.26%	1,329	18.70%
1916	3,802	49.19%	3,753	48.56%	174	2.25%
1920	7,495	59.99%	4,899	39.21%	99	0.79%
1924	6,206	53.14%	4,318	36.98%	1,154	9.88%
1928	7,540	59.39%	5,089	40.08%	67	0.53%
1932	5,918	42.04%	7,977	56.66%	183	1.30%
1936	6,275	42.59%	7,744	52.56%	714	4.85%
1940	8,656	58.05%	6,254	41.95%	0	0.00%
1944	8,529	62.83%	5,046	37.17%	0	0.00%
1948	6,785	56.84%	5,127	42.95%	24	0.20%
1952	9,355	64.68%	5,108	35.32%	0	0.00%
1956	9,834	70.03%	4,208	29.97%	0	0.00%
1960	9,666	65.68%	5,050	34.32%	0	0.00%
1964	6,194	44.60%	7,695	55.40%	0	0.00%
1968	7,835	57.92%	4,360	32.23%	1,332	9.85%
1972	9,545	71.28%	3,644	27.21%	202	1.51%
1976	8,344	58.42%	5,689	39.83%	251	1.76%
1980	7,866	61.11%	4,070	31.62%	936	7.27%
1984	9,570	73.68%	3,338	25.70%	80	0.62%
1988	9,410	70.56%	3,848	28.85%	78	0.58%
1992	7,227	50.83%	3,822	26.88%	3,168	22.28%
1996	6,999	53.67%	4,453	34.15%	1,589	12.18%
2000	8,679	65.66%	4,209	31.84%	331	2.50%
2004	10,678	72.02%	4,095	27.62%	54	0.36%
2008	9,168	62.36%	5,178	35.22%	355	2.41%
2012	9,585	68.97%	4,029	28.99%	284	2.04%
2016	10,469	76.03%	2,697	19.59%	604	4.39%
2020	11,650	77.70%	3,067	20.45%	277	1.85%
2024	11,616	78.45%	3,000	20.26%	190	1.28%

United States Senate election results for Van Wert County, Ohio1
Year	Republican		Democratic		Third party(ies)	
Year	No.	%	No.	%	No.	%
2024	10,826	74.12%	3,204	21.93%	577	3.95%

== Government ==
Van Wert County has a 3-member Board of County Commissioners that administer and oversee the various County departments, similar to all but 2 of the 88 Ohio counties. The elected commissioners serve four-year terms. Van Wert County's three elected commissioners are: Thad Lichtensteiger (R), Stan Owens (R), and Todd Wolfrum (R).

== Transportation ==
The Van Wert County Airport is located one nautical mile (1.2 mi; 1.9 km) west-southwest of Van Wert's central business district.

== Communities ==
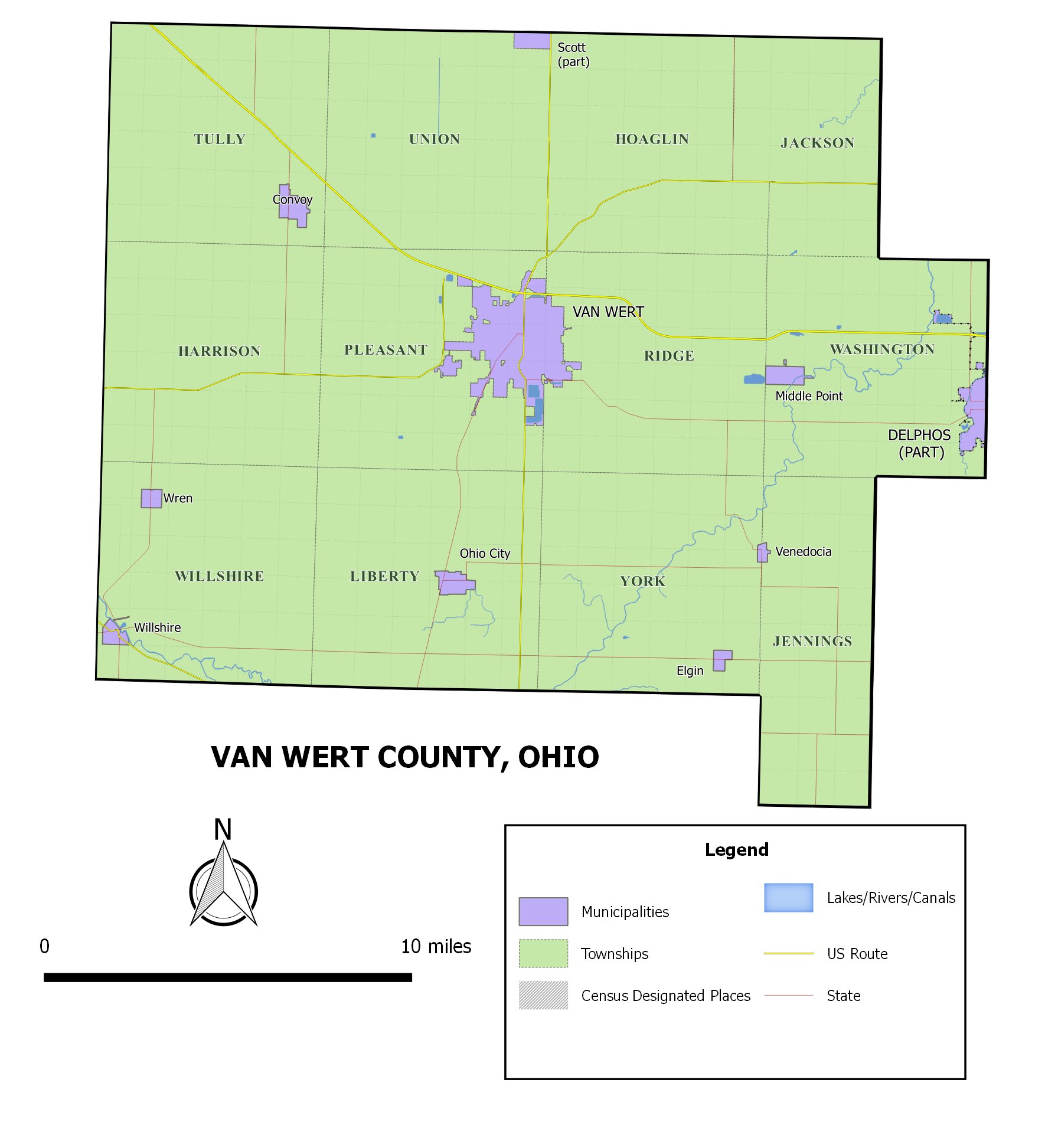
Municipalities and townships of Van Wert County

=== Cities ===
- Delphos (part)
- Van Wert (county seat)

=== Villages ===
- Convoy
- Elgin
- Middle Point
- Ohio City
- Scott
- Venedocia
- Willshire
- Wren

=== Townships ===
- Harrison
- Hoaglin
- Jackson
- Jennings
- Liberty
- Pleasant
- Ridge
- Tully
- Union
- Washington
- Willshire
- York

=== Unincorporated communities ===
- Abanaka
- Cavett
- Dixon‡
- Dull
- Glenmore
- Hoaglin
- Jonestown
- Middlebury
- Monticello
- Schumm
- Seamersville

== See also ==
- National Register of Historic Places listings in Van Wert County, Ohio
