= Jennings Township, Van Wert County, Ohio =

Township in Ohio, US

- Township
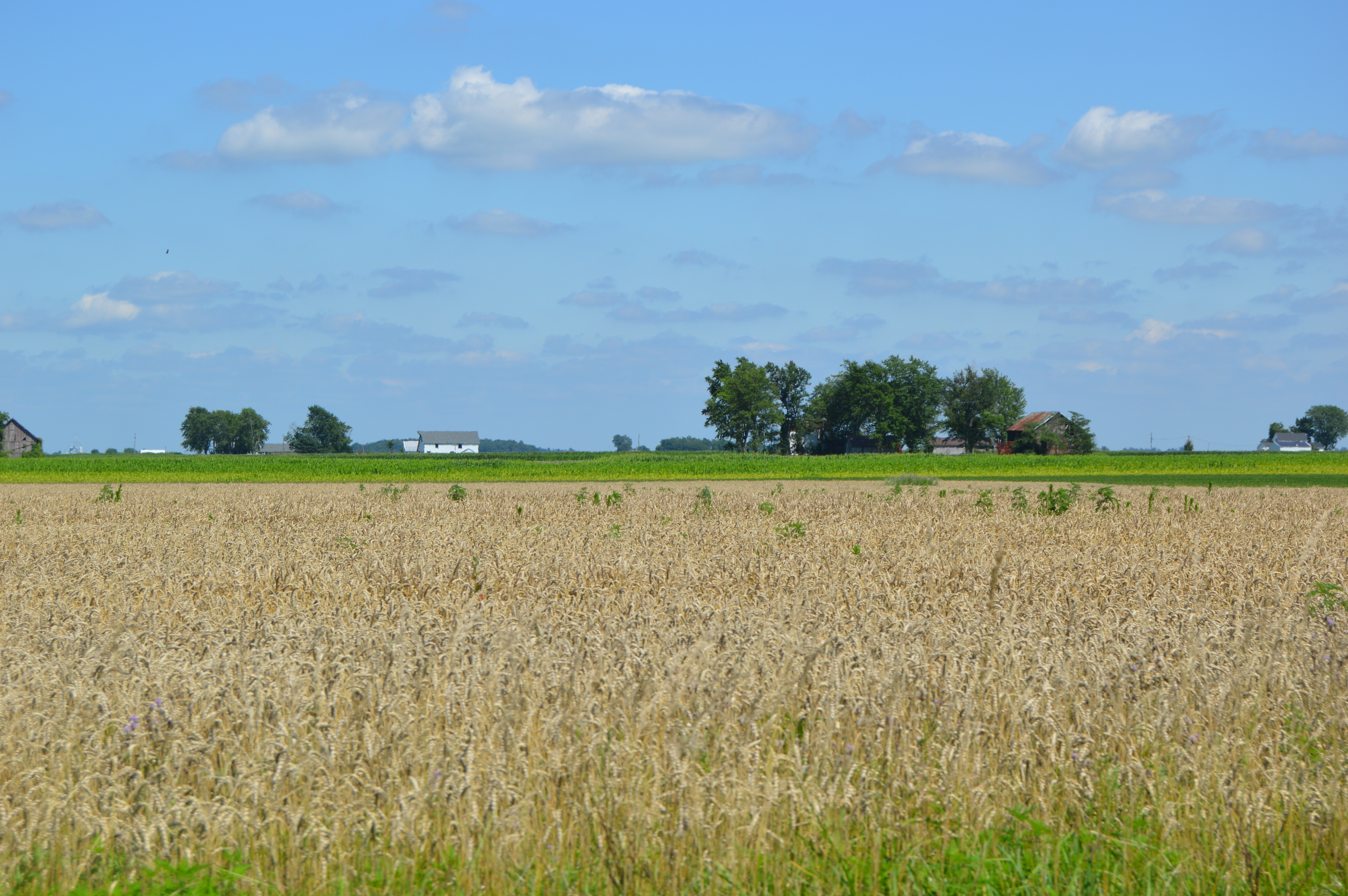
- Fields northeast of Venedocia

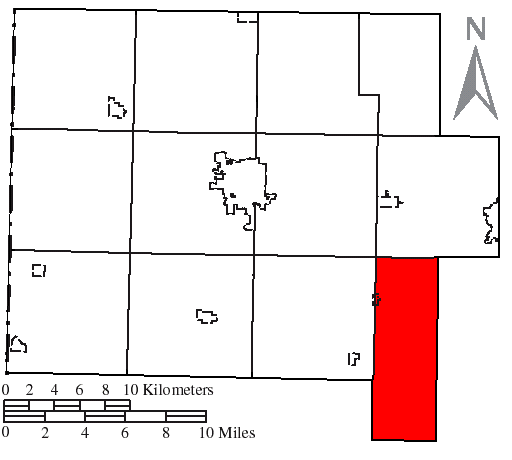
- Location of Jennings Township in Van Wert County
- Coordinates: 40°45′18″N 84°25′26″W
- Country: United States
- State: Ohio
- County: Van Wert

Area
  - Total: 28.1 sq mi (72.7 km^{2})
  - Land: 28.1 sq mi (72.7 km^{2})
  - Water: 0 sq mi (0.0 km^{2})
- Elevation: 810 ft (247 m)

Population (2020)
  - Total: 636
  - Density: 22.7/sq mi (8.75/km^{2})
- Time zone: UTC-5 (Eastern (EST))
  - Summer (DST): UTC-4 (EDT)
- FIPS code: 39-38990
- GNIS feature ID: 1087090

Jennings Township is one of the twelve townships of Van Wert County, Ohio, United States. The 2020 census found 636 people in the township.

== Geography ==
Located in the southeastern corner of the county, it borders the following townships:

- Washington Township - north
- Marion Township, Allen County - northeast
- Spencer Township, Allen County - east
- Salem Township, Auglaize County - south
- Union Township, Mercer County - southwest
- York Township - west
- Ridge Township - northwest corner

Part of the village of Venedocia is located in northwestern Jennings Township, along the border with York Township.

Van Wert County's most southerly point is located in Jennings Township. It is the only county township with a border on Auglaize County.

== Name and history ==
Statewide, the only other Jennings Township is located in Putnam County.

== Government ==
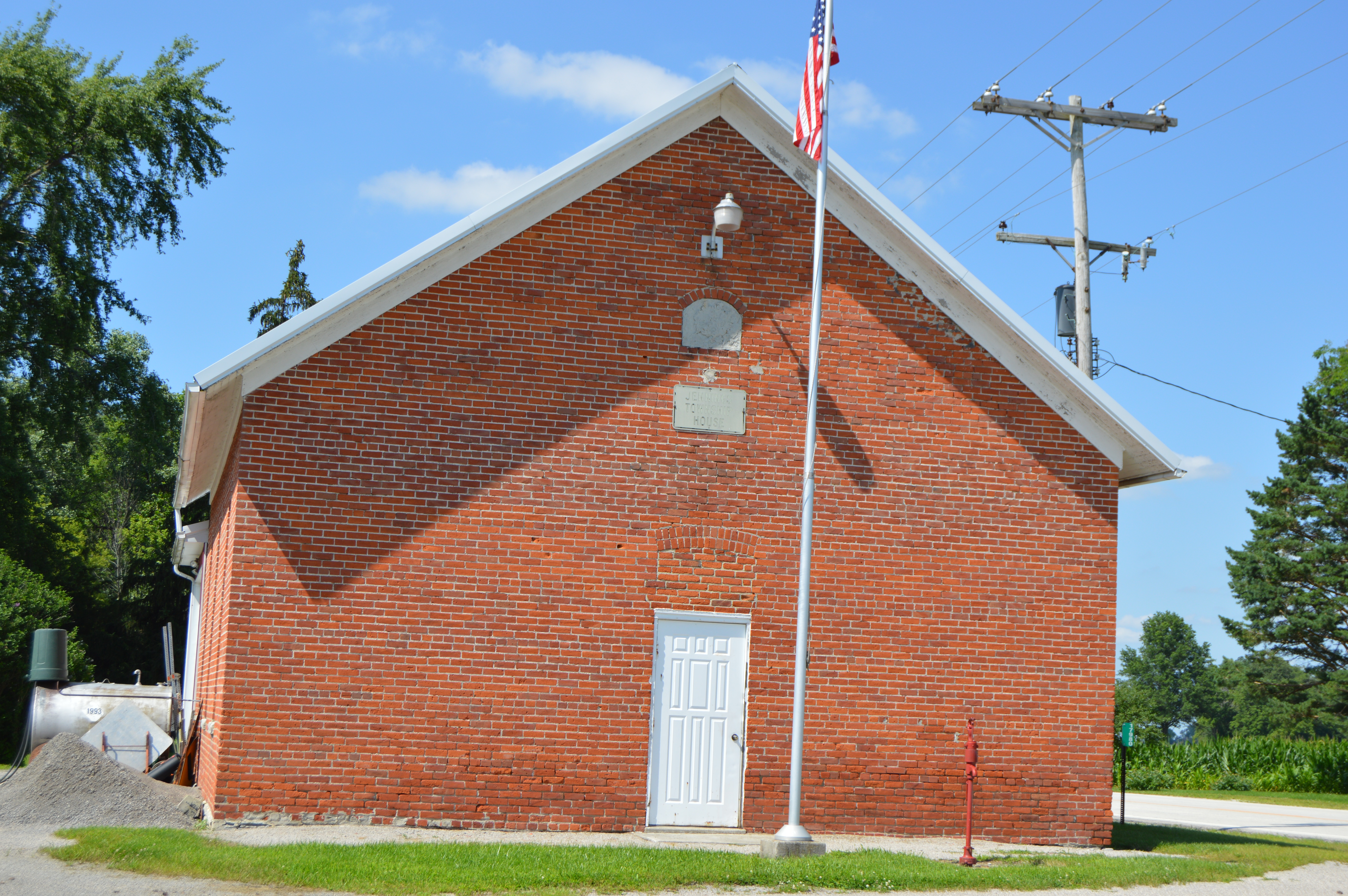
Jennings Town Hall

The township is governed by a three-member board of trustees, who are elected in November of odd-numbered years to a four-year term beginning on the following January 1. Two are elected in the year after the presidential election and one is elected in the year before it. There is also an elected township fiscal officer, who serves a four-year term beginning on April 1 of the year after the election, which is held in November of the year before the presidential election. Vacancies in the fiscal officership or on the board of trustees are filled by the remaining trustees.
