= Jackson Township, Van Wert County, Ohio =

Township in Ohio, US

- Township
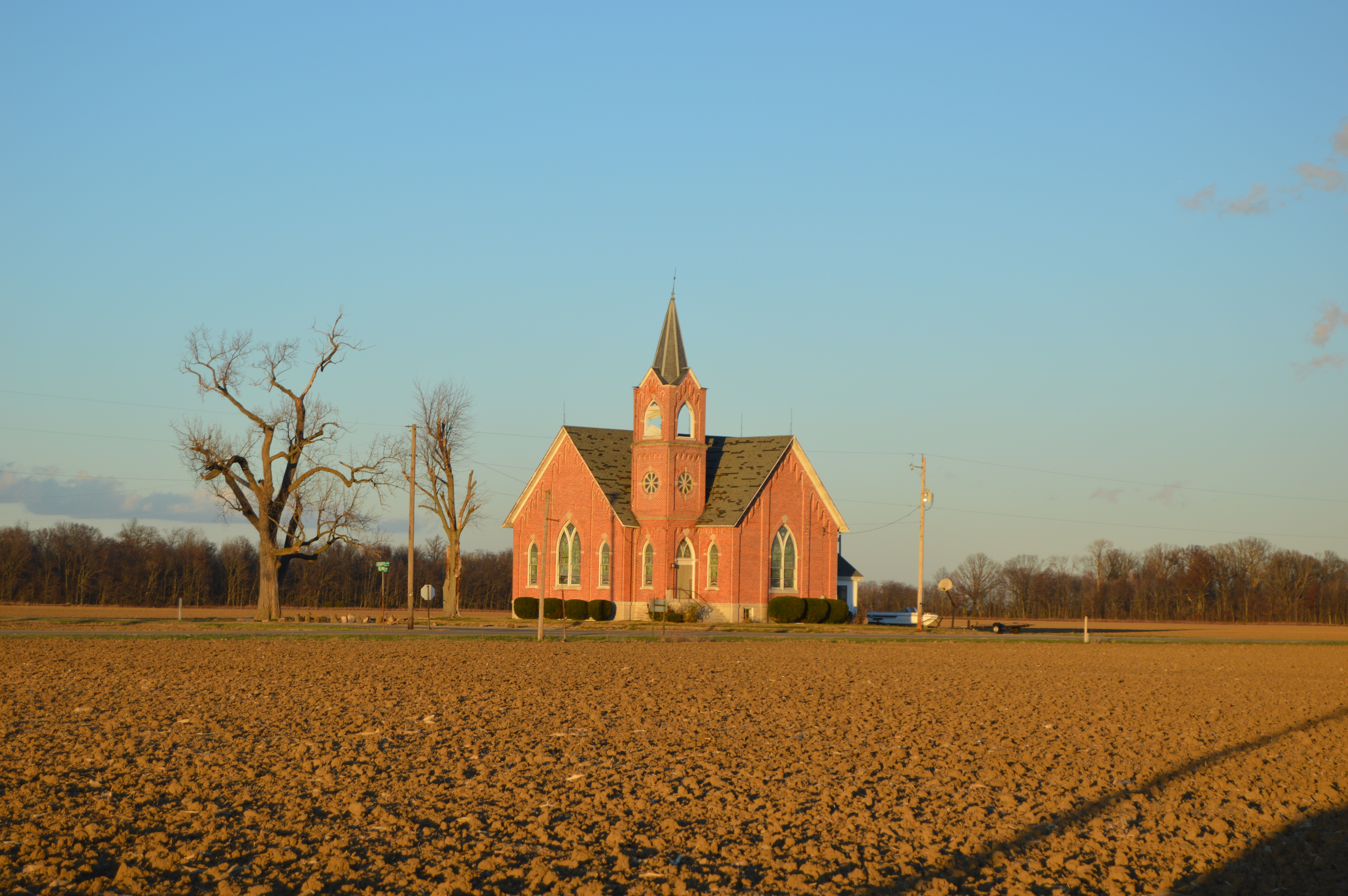
- Fields and the former Grace United Methodist Church

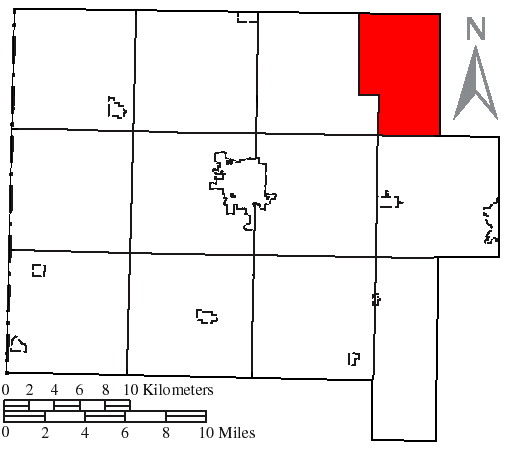
- Location of Jackson Township in Van Wert County
- Coordinates: 40°56′50″N 84°26′19″W
- Country: United States
- State: Ohio
- County: Van Wert

Area
  - Total: 22.3 sq mi (57.8 km^{2})
  - Land: 22.3 sq mi (57.8 km^{2})
  - Water: 0 sq mi (0.0 km^{2})
- Elevation: 738 ft (225 m)

Population (2020)
  - Total: 446
  - Density: 20.0/sq mi (7.72/km^{2})
- Time zone: UTC-5 (Eastern (EST))
  - Summer (DST): UTC-4 (EDT)
- FIPS code: 39-38122
- GNIS feature ID: 1087089

Jackson Township is one of the twelve townships of Van Wert County, Ohio, United States. The 2020 census found 446 people in the township.

== Geography ==
Located in the northeastern corner of the county, it borders the following townships:

- Washington Township, Paulding County - north
- Monterey Township, Putnam County - east
- Washington Township - south
- Ridge Township - southwest corner
- Hoaglin Township - west
- Latty Township, Paulding County - northwest

No municipalities are located within Jackson Township.

== Name and history ==
It is one of thirty-seven Jackson Townships statewide.

== Government ==
The township is governed by a three-member board of trustees, who are elected in November of odd-numbered years to a four-year term beginning on the following January 1. Two are elected in the year after the presidential election and one is elected in the year before it. There is also an elected township fiscal officer, who serves a four-year term beginning on April 1 of the year after the election, which is held in November of the year before the presidential election. Vacancies in the fiscal officership or on the board of trustees are filled by the remaining trustees.
