= Liberty Township, Van Wert County, Ohio =

Township in Ohio, US

Liberty Township, Van Wert, Ohio
- Township
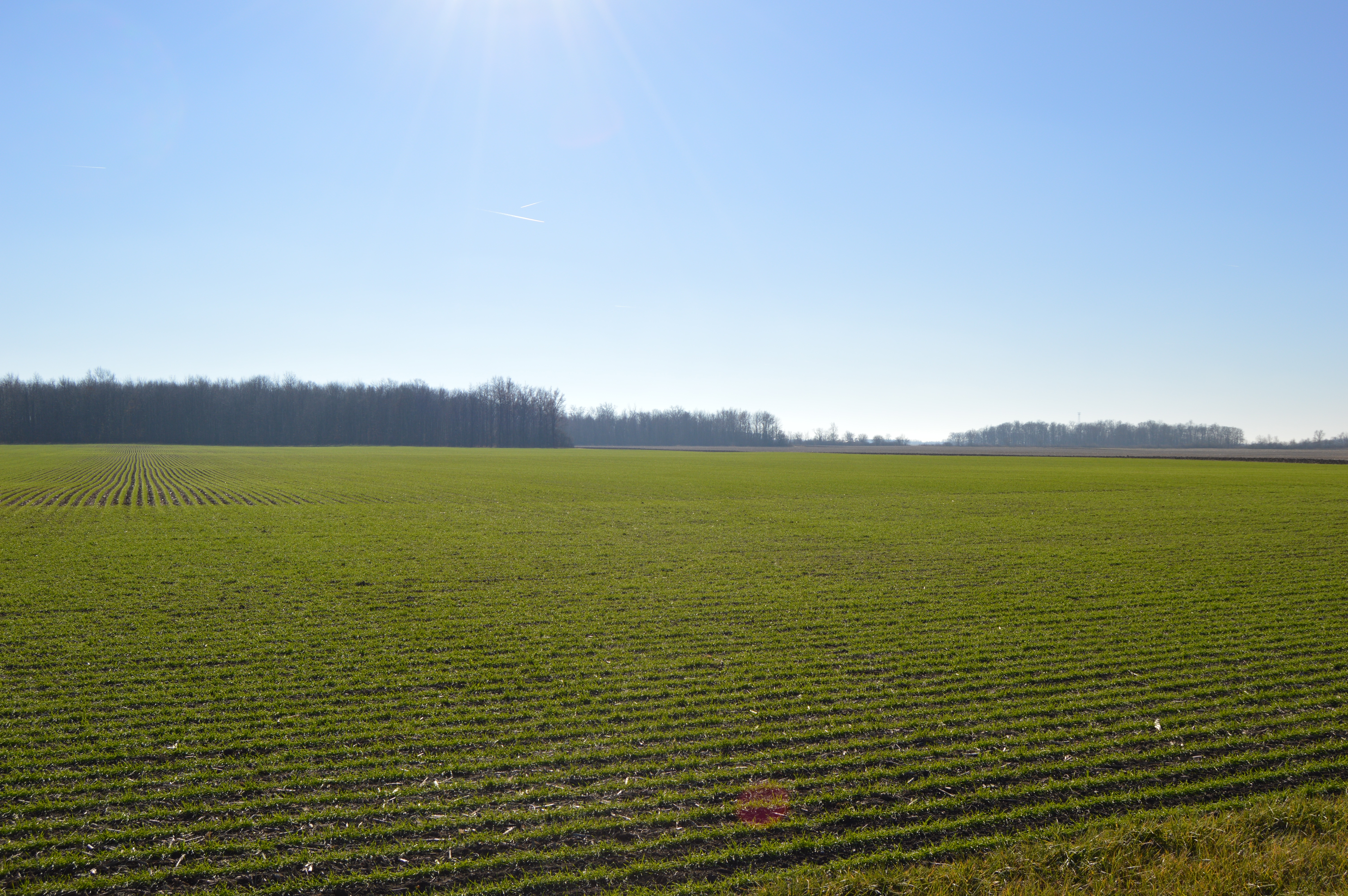
- Wheat fields west of Ohio City

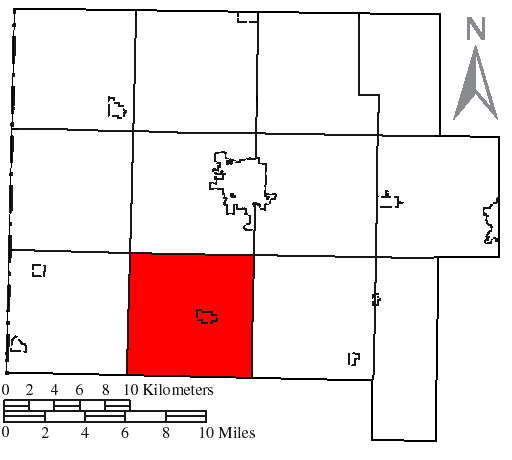
- Location of Liberty Township in Van Wert County
- Coordinates: 40°46′26″N 84°37′22″W
- Country: United States
- State: Ohio
- County: Van Wert

Area
  - Total: 37.1 sq mi (96.1 km^{2})
  - Land: 37.1 sq mi (96.1 km^{2})
  - Water: 0 sq mi (0.0 km^{2})
- Elevation: 820 ft (250 m)

Population (2020)
  - Total: 1,437
  - Density: 38.7/sq mi (15.0/km^{2})
- Time zone: UTC-5 (Eastern (EST))
  - Summer (DST): UTC-4 (EDT)
- FIPS code: 39-43372
- GNIS feature ID: 1087091

Liberty Township is one of the twelve townships of Van Wert County, Ohio, United States. The 2020 census found 1,437 people in the township.

== Geography ==
Located in the southern part of the county, it borders the following townships:

- Pleasant Township - north
- Ridge Township - northeast corner
- York Township - east
- Union Township, Mercer County - southeast corner
- Dublin Township, Mercer County - south
- Black Creek Township, Mercer County - southwest corner
- Willshire Township - west
- Harrison Township - northwest corner

The village of Ohio City is located in central Liberty Township. The unincorporated community of Dull lies in the township's southwest quadrant.

== Name and history ==
It is one of twenty-five Liberty Townships statewide.

== Government ==
The township is governed by a three-member board of trustees, who are elected in November of odd-numbered years to a four-year term beginning on the following January 1. Two are elected in the year after the presidential election and one is elected in the year before it. There is also an elected township fiscal officer, who serves a four-year term beginning on April 1 of the year after the election, which is held in November of the year before the presidential election. Vacancies in the fiscal officership or on the board of trustees are filled by the remaining trustees.
