= Elgin, Ohio =

- Village
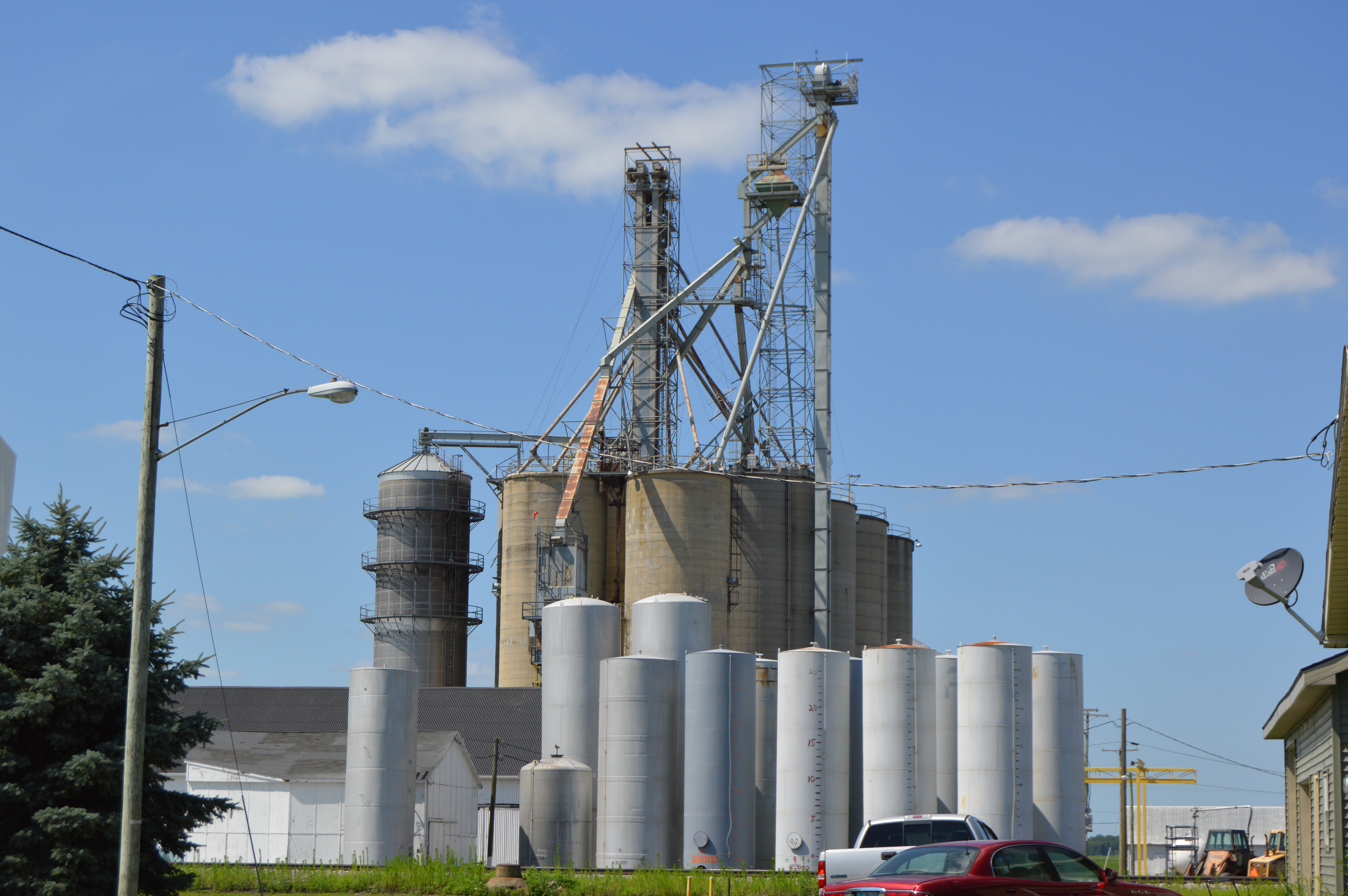
- Grain elevator

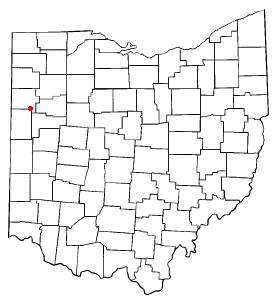
- Location of Elgin, Ohio

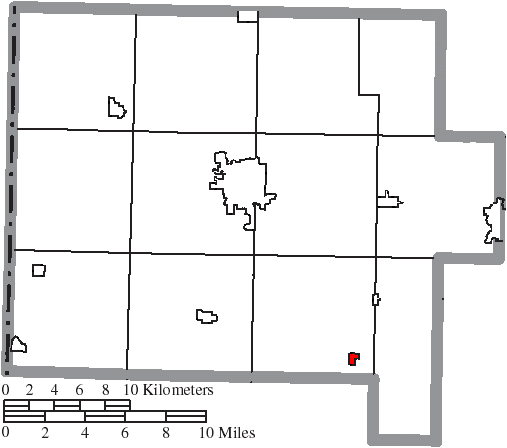
- Location of Elgin in Van Wert County
- Coordinates: 40°44′34″N 84°28′34″W
- Country: United States
- State: Ohio
- County: Van Wert
- Township: York

Area
  - Total: 0.22 sq mi (0.58 km^{2})
  - Land: 0.22 sq mi (0.58 km^{2})
  - Water: 0 sq mi (0.00 km^{2})
- Elevation: 814 ft (248 m)

Population (2020)
  - Total: 49
  - Estimate (2023): 45
  - Density: 219/sq mi (84.5/km^{2})
- Time zone: UTC-5 (Eastern (EST))
  - Summer (DST): UTC-4 (EDT)
- ZIP code: 45838
- Area code: 419
- FIPS code: 39-24794
- GNIS feature ID: 2398798

Elgin is a village in Van Wert County, Ohio, United States. The population was 49 at the 2020 census. It is included within the Van Wert, Ohio Micropolitan Statistical Area.

== Geography ==
According to the United States Census Bureau, the village has a total area of 0.23 square miles (0.60 km^{2}), all land.

== Demographics ==
Historical population
Census	Pop.	Note	%±
1900	208		—
1910	129		−38.0%
1920	115		−10.9%
1930	112		−2.6%
1940	116		3.6%
1950	126		8.6%
1960	80		−36.5%
1970	89		11.3%
1980	96		7.9%
1990	71		−26.0%
2000	50		−29.6%
2010	57		14.0%
2020	49		−14.0%
2023 (est.)	45	▼	−8.2%
U.S. Decennial Census

=== 2010 census ===
As of the census of 2010, there were 57 people, 22 households, and 17 families living in the village. The population density was 247.8 inhabitants per square mile (95.7/km^{2}). There were 22 housing units at an average density of 95.7 per square mile (36.9/km^{2}). The racial makeup of the village was 98.2% White and 1.8% from two or more races.

There were 22 households, of which 36.4% had children under the age of 18 living with them, 50.0% were married couples living together, 18.2% had a female householder with no husband present, 9.1% had a male householder with no wife present, and 22.7% were non-families. 22.7% of all households were made up of individuals, and 4.5% had someone living alone who was 65 years of age or older. The average household size was 2.59 and the average family size was 3.00.

The median age in the village was 37.3 years. 22.8% of residents were under the age of 18; 14% were between the ages of 18 and 24; 21% were from 25 to 44; 35% were from 45 to 64; and 7% were 65 years of age or older. The gender makeup of the village was 56.1% male and 43.9% female.

=== 2000 census ===
As of the census of 2000, there were 50 people, 19 households, and 15 families living in the village. The population density was 221.1 inhabitants per square mile (85.4/km^{2}). There were 20 housing units at an average density of 88.4 per square mile (34.1/km^{2}). The racial makeup of the village was 100.00% White.

There were 19 households, out of which 31.6% had children under the age of 18 living with them, 63.2% were married couples living together, 21.1% had a female householder with no husband present, and 15.8% were non-families. 15.8% of all households were made up of individuals, and 5.3% had someone living alone who was 65 years of age or older. The average household size was 2.63 and the average family size was 2.88.

In the village, the population was spread out, with 28.0% under the age of 18, 8.0% from 18 to 24, 34.0% from 25 to 44, 22.0% from 45 to 64, and 8.0% who were 65 years of age or older. The median age was 38 years. For every 100 females there were 72.4 males. For every 100 females age 18 and over, there were 89.5 males.

The median income for a household in the village was $38,750, and the median income for a family was $48,125. Males had a median income of $25,000 versus $25,417 for females. The per capita income for the village was $12,022. There were 18.2% of families and 22.0% of the population living below the poverty line, including 31.8% of under eighteens and none of those over 64.
