= Ohio City, Ohio =

- Village
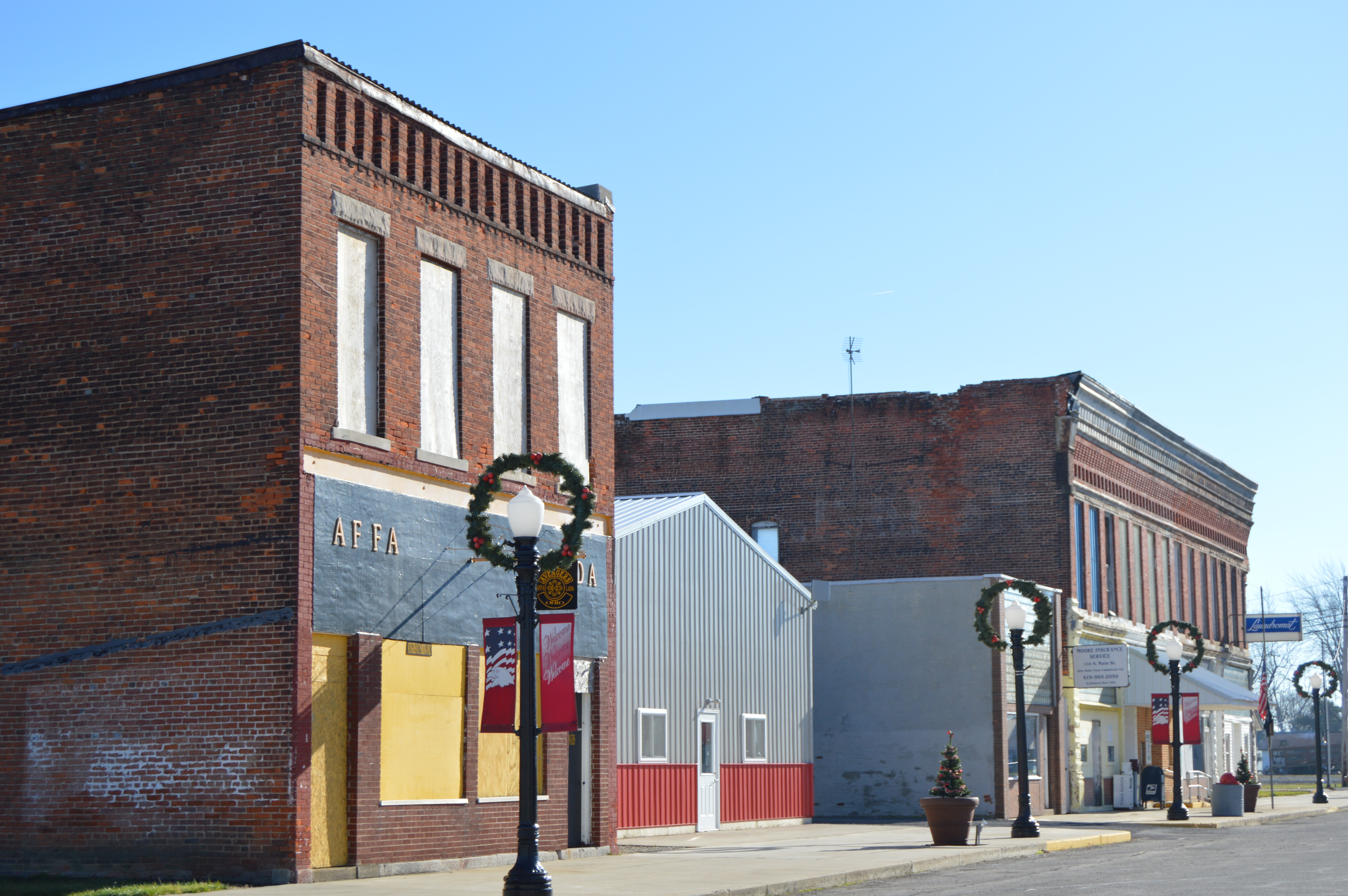
- Main Street downtown

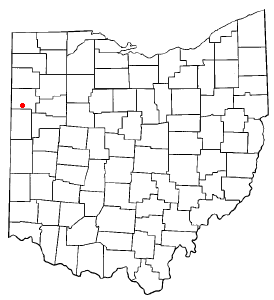
- Location of Ohio City, Ohio

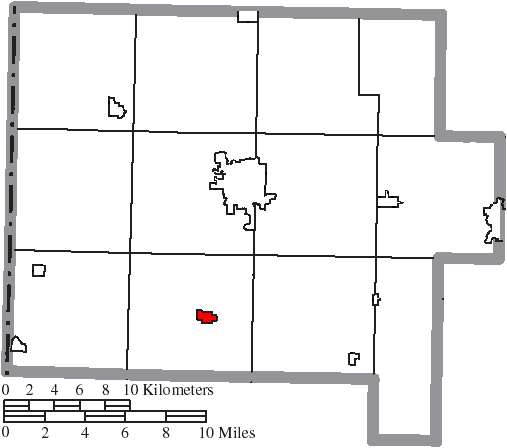
- Location of Ohio City in Van Wert County
- Coordinates: 40°46′18″N 84°37′20″W
- Country: United States
- State: Ohio
- County: Van Wert
- Township: Liberty

Government
  - Type: Mayor–Council
  - Mayor: David May Jr
  - Council: Glory Agler, Kent Ransbottom, Dave May, Elisha Mankey, Jack Brown
  - Administrator: Jeff Krugh

Area
  - Total: 0.53 sq mi (1.37 km^{2})
  - Land: 0.53 sq mi (1.37 km^{2})
  - Water: 0 sq mi (0.00 km^{2})
- Elevation: 820 ft (250 m)

Population (2020)
  - Total: 651
  - Density: 1,230.6/sq mi (475.12/km^{2})
- Time zone: UTC-5 (Eastern (EST))
  - Summer (DST): UTC-4 (EDT)
- ZIP code: 45874
- Area code: 419
- FIPS code: 39-58002
- GNIS feature ID: 2399563
- Website: www.villageofohiocity.org

Ohio City is a village in Liberty Township, Van Wert County, Ohio, United States. The population was 651 at the 2020 census. It is included within the Van Wert, Ohio Micropolitan Statistical Area.

== Geography ==
According to the United States Census Bureau, the village has a total area of 0.53 square miles (1.37 km^{2}), all land.

== Demographics ==
Historical population
Census	Pop.	Note	%±
1890	666		—
1900	862		29.4%
1910	860		−0.2%
1920	848		−1.4%
1930	879		3.7%
1940	870		−1.0%
1950	861		−1.0%
1960	851		−1.2%
1970	816		−4.1%
1980	881		8.0%
1990	899		2.0%
2000	784		−12.8%
2010	705		−10.1%
2020	651		−7.7%
U.S. Decennial Census

=== 2010 census ===
As of the census of 2010, there were 705 people, 287 households, and 198 families residing in the village. The population density was 1,330.2 inhabitants per square mile (513.6/km^{2}). There were 338 housing units at an average density of 637.7 per square mile (246.2/km^{2}). The racial makeup of the village was 97.4% White, 0.3% Native American, 0.1% Asian, 1.3% from other races, and 0.9% from two or more races. Hispanic or Latino of any race were 3.8% of the population.

There were 287 households, of which 31.0% had children under the age of 18 living with them, 57.1% were married couples living together, 7.7% had a female householder with no husband present, 4.2% had a male householder with no wife present, and 31.0% were non-families. 27.9% of all households were made up of individuals, and 13.5% had someone living alone who was 65 years of age or older. The average household size was 2.46 and the average family size was 3.01.

The median age in the village was 40.1 years. 24.4% of residents were under the age of 18; 7.1% were between the ages of 18 and 24; 26.1% were from 25 to 44; 28.7% were from 45 to 64; and 13.6% were 65 years of age or older. The gender makeup of the village was 48.9% male and 51.1% female.

=== 2000 census ===
As of the census of 2000, there were 784 people, 312 households, and 218 families residing in the village. The population density was 1,706.0 inhabitants per square mile (658.7/km^{2}). There were 329 housing units at an average density of 715.9 per square mile (276.4/km^{2}). The racial makeup of the village was 97.32% White, 0.13% African American, 0.13% Asian, 1.15% from other races, and 1.28% from two or more races. Hispanic or Latino of any race were 1.91% of the population.

There were 312 households, out of which 36.2% had children under the age of 18 living with them, 57.7% were married couples living together, 9.0% had a female householder with no husband present, and 30.1% were non-families. 25.6% of all households were made up of individuals, and 12.2% had someone living alone who was 65 years of age or older. The average household size was 2.51 and the average family size was 3.00.

In the village, the population was spread out, with 26.7% under the age of 18, 11.4% from 18 to 24, 28.7% from 25 to 44, 20.7% from 45 to 64, and 12.6% who were 65 years of age or older. The median age was 36 years. For every 100 females there were 98.5 males. For every 100 females age 18 and over, there were 96.9 males.

The median income for a household in the village was $37,500, and the median income for a family was $42,734. Males had a median income of $29,526 versus $23,125 for females. The per capita income for the village was $16,304. About 1.7% of families and 3.6% of the population were below the poverty line, including 1.4% of those under age 18 and 1.2% of those age 65 or over.

== History ==
The village was platted on March 4–8, 1876, by Butler, Patterson & Company as Van Wert Junction. On June 1, 1882, a vote was taken with 28 for and 11 against to change the name to Enterprise. The name Enterprise caused much confusion to the post office at the time because there was another Enterprise in Preble County. Again, the name was in need of being changed.

The town council met on June 1, 1890, and a man by the name of Lewis J. Kiggins brought up the subject, and asked the rest of the men if they liked Ohio City. The vote was taken and Ohio City became the new name.

In 1910, Ohio City was a very prosperous town. Being on the junction of several major railroads, its importance allowed it to sport three churches, one union school, two dry goods stores, two hardware stores, one clothing store, two millinery establishments, three hotels, three restaurants, one bakery, four saloons, two shoe shops, one tailor shop, one silversmith shop, one slack barrel factory, one lumber yard, two blacksmith shops, two elevators, one tile factory, one beet dump, two sawmills, one harness shop, one ice-making house, and three railroads all using the centrally located Union Depot.

== Education ==
Ohio City has a public library, a branch of the Brumback Library.

== Arts and culture ==
The annual "Lambert Days" festival (honoring John William Lambert) is held on the third full weekend in July. This festival has activities such as a car show, a whiffle ball tournament, softball, a parade, and a Texas hold 'em tournament.

== Bibliography ==
- Bailey, L. Scott, Historic Discovery: 1891 Lambert, New Claim for America's First Car, Antique Automobile magazine, Vol. 24, No. 5, October–November 1960
- Encyclopædia Britannica, Encyclopædia Britannica Inc., Chicago, 1968
- Scharchburg, Richard P., Carriages Without Horses: J. Frank Duryea and the Birth of the American Automobile Industry, SAE, 1993, ISBN 1-56091-380-0
