= Hoaglin Township, Van Wert County, Ohio =

Township in Ohio, US

- Township
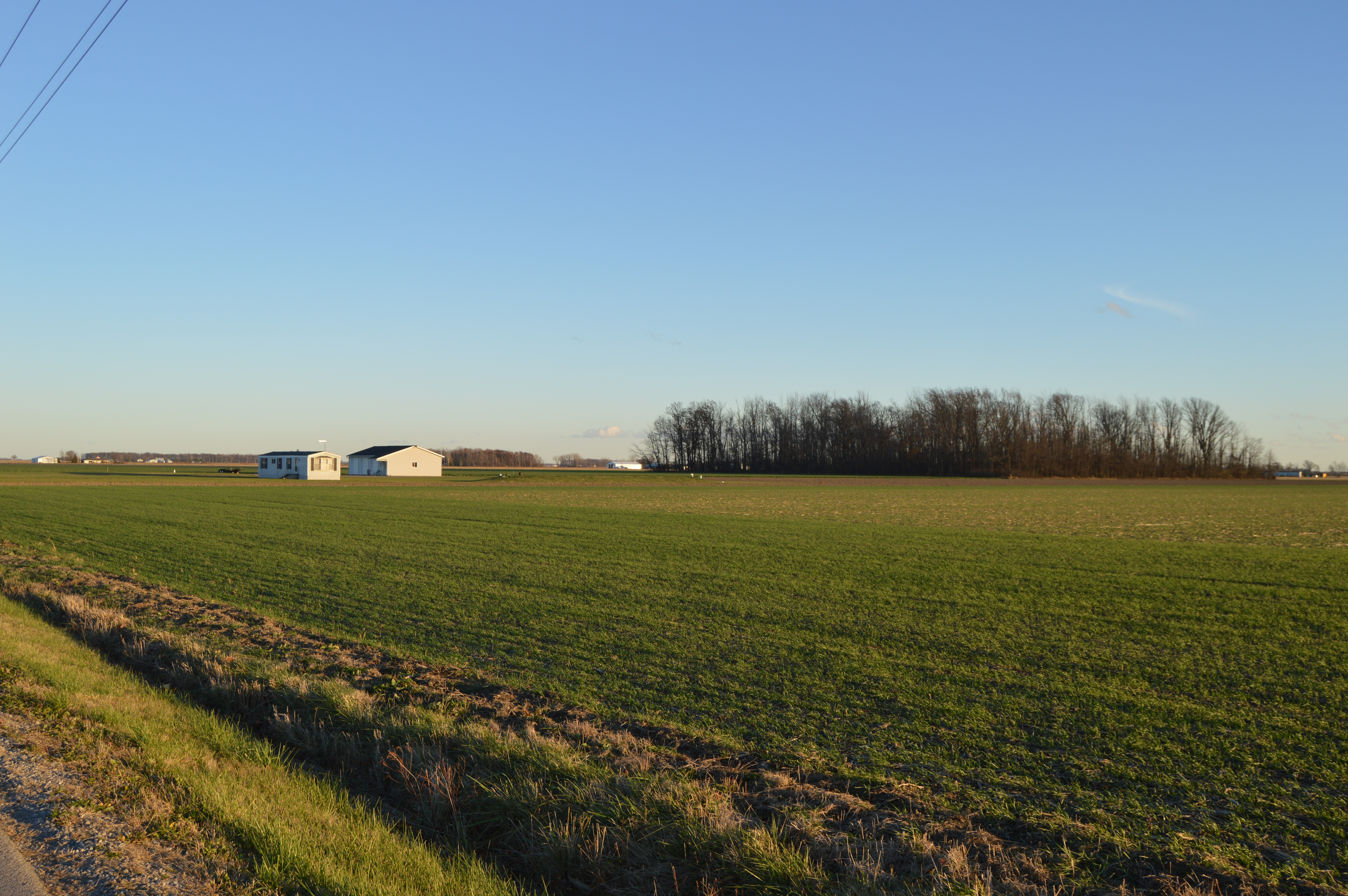
- Fields off U.S. Route 224

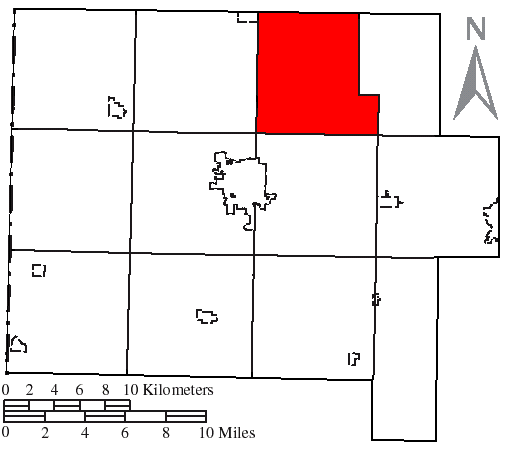
- Location of Hoaglin Township in Van Wert County
- Coordinates: 40°56′20″N 84°31′26″W
- Country: United States
- State: Ohio
- County: Van Wert

Area
  - Total: 32.2 sq mi (83.5 km^{2})
  - Land: 32.2 sq mi (83.5 km^{2})
  - Water: 0 sq mi (0.0 km^{2})
- Elevation: 748 ft (228 m)

Population (2020)
  - Total: 650
  - Density: 20/sq mi (7.8/km^{2})
- Time zone: UTC-5 (Eastern (EST))
  - Summer (DST): UTC-4 (EDT)
- FIPS code: 39-35756
- GNIS feature ID: 1087088

Hoaglin Township is one of the twelve townships of Van Wert County, Ohio, United States. The 2020 census reported 650 people in the township.

== Geography ==
Located in the northern part of the county, it borders the following townships:

- Latty Township, Paulding County - north
- Jackson Township - east
- Washington Township - southeast corner
- Ridge Township - south
- Pleasant Township - southwest corner
- Union Township - west
- Blue Creek Township, Paulding County - northwest corner

No municipalities are located within Hoaglin Township.

== Name and history ==
It is the only Hoaglin Township statewide.

== Government ==
The township is governed by a three-member board of trustees, who are elected in November of odd-numbered years to a four-year term beginning on the following January 1. Two are elected in the year after the presidential election and one is elected in the year before it. There is also an elected township fiscal officer, who serves a four-year term beginning on April 1 of the year after the election, which is held in November of the year before the presidential election. Vacancies in the fiscal officership or on the board of trustees are filled by the remaining trustees.
