= Bentley Book Prize =

World History Association Bentley Book Prize
- Description: Recognition for outstanding books in world history
- Presented by: World History Association (WHA)
- Reward: $500
- Website: www.thewha.org/wha-awards/bentley-book-prize/

The World History Association Bentley Book Prize is an annual award given by the World History Association. It was first awarded in 1999 as the World History Association Book Prize; the name was changed in 2012 to honor Jerry H. Bentley. The prize is $500.

It should not be confused with the Jerry Bentley Prize in World History, a similar book prize established in 2014 by the American Historical Association.

== Winners ==
Past winners:

- 1999: Andre Gunder Frank, Re-Orient: Global Economy in the Asian Age
- 2000: James McClellan III and Harold Dorn, Science and Technology in World History: An Introduction
- 2001: (co-winners)
  - John Robert McNeill, Something New under the Sun: An Environmental History of The Twentieth Century World
  - Kenneth Pomeranz, The Great Divergence: China, Europe, and the Making of the Modern World Economy
- 2002: Mike Davis, Late Victorian Holocausts: El Niño Famines and the Making of the Third World
- 2003: Lauren Benton, Law and Colonial Cultures: Legal Regimes in World History, 1400-1900
- 2004: Victor Lieberman, Strange Parallels: Southeast Asia in Global Context, c. 800 – 1830, Vol. I: “Integration on the Mainland”
- 2005: David Christian, Maps of Time: An Introduction to Big History
- 2006: No prize
- 2007: Felipe Fernández-Armesto, Pathfinders: A Global History of Exploration
- 2008: Stuart Banner, Possessing the Pacific Land, Settlers, and Indigenous People from Australia to Alaska
- 2009: (co-winners)
  - Adam McKeown, Melancholy Order: Asian Migration and the Globalization of Borders, 1834-1929
  - Joachim Radkau, Nature and Power: A Global History of the Environment
- 2010: John Chavez, Beyond Nations: Evolving Homelands in the North Atlantic World
- 2011: Jane Burbank and Frederick Cooper, Empires in World History: Power and the Politics of Difference
- 2012: Prasannan Parthasarathi, Why Europe Grew Rich and Asia Did Not: Global Economic Divergence, 1600-1850
- 2013: (co-winners)
  - Carl Nightingale, Segregation: A Global History of Divided Cities
  - John K. Thornton, A Cultural History of the Atlantic World 1250-1820
- 2014: Giorgio Riello, Cotton: The Fabric that Made the Modern World
- 2015: Alfred J. Rieber, The Struggle for The Eurasian Borderlands: From the Rise of Early Modern Empires to the End of the First World War
- 2016: Robert DuPlessis, Material Atlantic: Clothing, Commerce and Colonization in the Atlantic World, 1650 – 1800
- 2017: (co-winners)
  - Jonathan Eacott, Selling Empire: India Goods in the Making of Britain and America, 1600 – 1730
  - Kiran Klaus Patel, The New Deal: A Global History
- 2018: (co-winners)
  - Fahad Ahmad Bishara, A Sea of Debt: Law and Economic Life in the Western Indian Ocean, 1780-1950
  - Lorelle Semley, To be Free and French: Citizenship in France’s Atlantic Empire
- 2019: Edward Rugemer, Slave Law and the Politics of Resistance in the Early Atlantic World
- 2020: Alan Strathern, Unearthly Powers: Religious and Political Change in World History
- 2021: (co-winners)
  - Gijs Mom, Globalizing Automobilism: Exuberance and the Emergence of Layered Mobility, 1900 – 1980
  - Mira Siegelberg, Statelessness: A Modern History
- 2022: (co-winners)
  - Melissa Macauley, Distant Shores: Colonial Encounters on China’s Maritime Frontier (Princeton University Press)
  - Sujit Sivasundaram, Waves Across the South: A New History of Revolution and Empire (University of Chicago Press)
- 2023: Nile Green, How Asia Found Herself: A Story of Intercultural Understanding
- 2024: (co-winners)
  - Francesca Bray, Barbara Hahn, John Bosco Lourdusamy and Tiago Saraiva, Moving Crops and the Scales of History
  - Gunja Sengupta and Awam Amkpa, Sojourners, Sultans, and Slaves: America and the Indian Ocean in the Age of Abolition and Empire
- 2025: Marcy Norton, The Tame and the Wild: People and Animals after 1492 (Harvard University Press)
- 2026: Sven Beckert, Capitalism: A Global History (Penguin/Random House, 2025)

== See also ==
- List of history awards
