= Ann Laura Stoler =

American anthropologist

- Born: 1949 (age 76–77); Brooklyn, New York, U.S.
- Title: Willy Brandt Distinguished University Professor of Anthropology and Historical Studies

Academic background
- Education: Barnard College; Columbia University

Ann Laura Stoler (born 1949) is the Willy Brandt Distinguished University Professor of Anthropology and Historical Studies at The New School for Social Research in New York City. She has made significant contributions to the fields of colonial and postcolonial studies, historical anthropology, feminist theory, and affect. She is particularly known for her writings on race and sexuality in the works of French philosopher Michel Foucault.

Her books include Capitalism and Confrontation in Sumatra's Plantation Belt, 1870-1979 (1985), Race and the Education of Desire: Foucault's History of Sexuality and the Colonial Order of Things (1995), Carnal Knowledge and Imperial Power: Race and the Intimate in Colonial Rule (2002), Along the Archival Grain: Epistemic Anxieties and Colonial Common Sense (2009), and Duress: Imperial Durabilities in Our Times (2016).

Her edited volumes include Tensions of Empire: Colonial Cultures in a Bourgeois World (1997, with Frederick Cooper), Haunted by Empire: Geographies of Intimacy in North American History (2006), Imperial Formations (2007, with Carole McGranahan and Peter C. Perdue), and Imperial Debris: On Ruin and Ruination (2013).

== Personal life ==
Stoler was born in Brooklyn, New York in 1949 and grew up on the north shore of Long Island, New York. She received her B.A. in anthropology from Barnard College (1972), and her M.A. (1976) and Ph.D. (1982) in anthropology from Columbia University. Stoler's partner, Lawrence A. Hirschfeld, is a professor of anthropology and psychology at the New School for Social Research. She has two children. She and her first husband, Benjamin N.F. White, collaborated in their early work in Central Java before their divorce. Her deceased sister, Barbara Stoler Miller, a professor at Barnard College and Columbia University, has left a poetic mark on her writing.

== Career ==
Stoler taught at the University of Wisconsin-Madison from 1983 to 1989 and at the University of Michigan from 1989 to 2004, before moving to the New School for Social Research, where she was the founding chair of its revitalized Anthropology Department. She is also the founding director of the Institute for Critical Social Inquiry (ICSI) at The New School for Social Research, a residential seminar that each year brings together an international cohort of sixty junior and senior scholars for a week-long master class with three distinguished thinkers.

Stoler has held visiting appointments at the Center for Advanced Study in the Behavioral Sciences, University of California-Berkeley, Stanford University, the University of California-Santa Cruz, Cornell University's School of Criticism and Theory, the École des Hautes Études en Sciences Sociales, the École Normale Supérieure, the Centre National de la Recherche Scientifique and Paris 8, the Johannesburg Workshop in Theory and Criticism, the University of California-Irvine, Birzeit University in Ramallah, the University of Lisbon, and the Bard Prison Initiative. She has served on the editorial boards of Comparative Studies in Society and History, Constellations, and Cultural Anthropology, among others, and was a founding co-editor with Adi Ophir of the collaborative journal and conference series Political Concepts: A Critical Lexicon.

Stoler's fellowships and awards include Fulbright, Guggenheim, National Endowment for the Humanities, Henry Luce Foundation, National Science Foundation, and Social Science Research Council. She has delivered the Lewis Henry Morgan Distinguished Lectures and the Jensen Memorial Lectures at Goethe Frankfurt University.

== Writing ==
Stoler is known for her work on the politics of knowledge, colonial governance, racial epistemologies, the sexual politics of empire, and ethnography of the archives. Her regional focus has long been Southeast Asia, though she has also written about France and Palestine. Stoler works in the areas of political economy, feminism, continental philosophy, and critical race studies. Her focus is on “concept-work” and “fieldwork in philosophy,” influenced by Etienne Balibar and Michel Foucault.

Stoler describes her youth as one of the formative aspects of her research interests, specifically of being aware of the “quotidian weight of distinctions” as a Jewish girl in class-conscious mid-20th century Long Island, adjacent to New York City and its worlds of taste and racial difference. In a 2019 interview in DisClosure, she said: “Categories of people and things, race was inscribed in that everyday—in who was not in our schools, where my father worked but did not play, where winter vacations took us, in places my family would not go. I’m ever more convinced that race was a subtext in my growing up—those who would be excluded and those places my parents feared I might be excluded from.”

Stoler describes her research and writing as a search for elusive and unyielding aspects of power. “Understanding how power works has long pulled me in different directions—from Marx to Foucault to Marguerite Duras, and back again through Raymond Williams’ 'structures of feeling' and again to Foucault ... [including] his forceful claim that 'every sentiment has a history.'" The affective aspects of the colonial and imperial state is a topic throughout Stoler’s work, from Dutch and French colonialism in Indonesia and Vietnam, to her recent work on Palestine and the U.S., showing how affects such as fear and disregard shape and entrench inequalities based on cultural categories such as race: “My work has pushed between inscription, prescription, and ascription, how race is inscribed in the colonial archives, how ways of being are prescribed for Europeans and how they in turn ascribe features to others, those populations who they so often saw as a potential threat.”

=== Major works ===
==== Capitalism and Confrontation in Sumatra’s Plantation Belt, 1870–1979 ====
Capitalism and Confrontation in Sumatra’s Plantation Belt, 1870–1979 is Stoler's first book, published in 1985 by Yale University Press. Stoler's focus is on Dutch plantations in east Sumatra, Indonesia and the tenor and shape of relations between budding multinational agribusiness and workers, specifically Javanese workers’ resistance to the conditions of their life and labor. Using a combination of anthropological and historical methods, Stoler insists on the relationship between class, ethnicity, and gender, making her work a study of both colonizer and colonized. In the book, Stoler argues that resistance to colonialism transformed plantation logics of labor and abuse as well as Javanese economic, political, and social experiences and senses of community. In 1995, the University of Michigan issued a second edition of the book with a new preface by Stoler. In 1992, the Association for Asian Studies awarded her the Harry J. Benda Prize in Southeast Asian Studies for Capitalism and Confrontation.

==== Race and the Education of Desire: Foucault’s History of Sexuality and the Colonial Order of Things ====
In her 1995 book, Race and the Education of Desire: Foucault’s History of Sexuality and the Colonial Order of Things (Duke University Press), Stoler draws on archival research, as well as Foucault's 1976 Collège de France lectures, to rethink how we trace genealogies of race with and without European colonialism. Stoler takes up two questions about the connections among colonialism, sexuality, and racism. First, she asks why Foucault's discussion of 19th-century European sexuality never involved Europe's colonial subjects. And, second, “given this omission, what are the consequences for his treatment of racism in the making of the European bourgeois subject?”. The book, then, is both a critique of colonial studies that takes on Michel Foucault's work as a guiding text and a study of colonial life that accounts for racialized sexuality's place in the empire.

==== Tensions of Empire: Colonial Cultures in a Bourgeois World ====
Tensions of Empire: Colonial Cultures in a Bourgeois World is Ann Stoler's third book, a volume co-edited with Fredrick Cooper. Contributors to the volume are Homi Bhabha, Dipesh Chakrabarty, Fanny Colonna, John Comaroff, Fred Cooper, Anna Davin, Nancy Rose Hunt, Uday Mehta, Ann Laura Stoler, Susan Thorne, Luise White, Lora Wildenthal, and Gwendolyn Wright.

Tensions of Empire contributes to an analysis of colonial powers, not as coherent and uniform forms of governance but rather as regimes made of contradictions and inconsistencies. The book is guided by a central query, which asks how colonial situations have shaped not only imperial projects, but also the events, conflicts, and conceptual worlds of the metropole.

==== Carnal Knowledge and Imperial Power: Race and the Intimate in Colonial Rule ====
Carnal Knowledge and Imperial Power: Race and the Intimate in Colonial Rule provides an interpretive framework for identifying and making sense of the way that colonial rule intrudes into intimate relationships, impacting ideas and practices of privilege, property, sentiment, bodily connections, and categories of belonging such as race, class, and nationality. In Stoler's words, the affective grid of colonial politics reveals how “domestic and familiar intimacies were critical political sites in themselves where racial affiliations were worked out.” Published in 2002 by University of California Press, with a second edition released in 2010, Carnal Knowledge and Imperial Power brings together essays dating back to 1989. Combining ethnographic history, feminist intervention, and archival work, Stoler takes the reader from archive to bedroom, plantation fields to nursery, and childrearing manuals to awkward interviews with Indonesian women who were servants for Dutch colonial families. Again, Stoler shows how social classifications—as well as colonial and academic projects of comparison—are not benign cultural acts but potent political ones.

==== Haunted by Empire: Geographies of Intimacy in North American History ====
Haunted by Empire: Geographies of Intimacy in North American History was published by Duke University Press in 2006. The volume first began as a roundtable in the Journal of American History on Stoler's essay, "Tense and Tender Ties: The Politics of Comparison in North American History and (Post)-Colonial Studies" (chapter 2 in the book). The project then evolved as a workshop at the University of Michigan, with the final volume including essays from eighteen scholars in anthropology, history, American studies, women's and gender studies, and literature.

If the project began as a response to Stoler's essay, the final book is a more plural set of interventions that take up the ways that U.S. empire is rendered as an object of inquiry; how intimate relations articulated imperial power; and the politics of knowledge production and comparison that for so long made such a collaboration unlikely.

Contributors to the volume are Warwick Anderson, Laura Briggs, Kathleen Brown, Nancy F. Cott, Shannon Lee Dawdy, Linda Gordon, Catherine Hall, Martha Hodes, Paul A. Kramer, Lisa Lowe, Tiya Miles, Gwenn A. Miller, Emily S. Rosenberg, Damon Salesa, Nayan Shah, Alexandra Minna Stern, Ann Laura Stoler, and Laura Wexler.

==== Imperial Formations ====
Imperial Formations is a volume which began as a 2003 Advanced Seminar organized by Stoler and Carole McGranahan for the School for Advanced Research in Santa Fe, and was published in 2007 by SAR Press, co-edited by Stoler, Carole McGranahan, and Peter C. Perdue. The book is guided by the following questions: What does “empire” look like beyond Europe? Is European colonialism of the late nineteenth and early twentieth centuries the representative form that imperial formations take?

In Imperial Formations, Stoler and McGranahan's introduction highlights the often blurred, processual nature of imperial formations, asking not only about how to open up understanding of the imperial, but also what effective knowledge of imperial formations is now as much as in the past. The book builds on Stoler's earlier work but does so for a range of imperial formations: American, Chinese, Japanese, Ottoman, Russian and Soviet alongside European ones. Placing such cases side-by-side, the book challenges tendencies toward European exceptionalism by including non-European, communist, and non-capitalist empires outside of the liberal state model in the conversation.

Contributors to the volume are Jane Burbank, Frederick Cooper, Fernando Coronil, Nicholas Dirks, Prasenjit Duara, Adeeb Khalid, Ussama Makdisi, Carole McGranahan, Peter Perdue, Irene Silverblatt, and Ann Laura Stoler.

==== Along the Archival Grain: Epistemic Anxieties and Colonial Common Sense ====
Along the Archival Grain: Epistemic Anxieties and Colonial Common Sense was published in 2009 by Princeton University Press. Parts of the book were first delivered as the Lewis Henry Morgan Distinguished Lectures at the University of Rochester in 1996 and translated into French in 2019 as Au coeur de l’archive coloniale with a preface by the French historian Arlette Farge.

Along the Archival Grain: Epistemic Anxieties and Colonial Common Sense can be seen as a consolidation of several trajectories in Stoler's work as well as a major intervention into two fields that she helped define over the previous two decades—historical anthropology and colonial studies—at a moment when both had become centers of gravity for critical scholarship.

The book treats archives as subjects of inquiry and sites of power in their own right. Over seven chapters, Stoler pushes for a reappraisal of how colonial governance, archives, reason and sentiment, and social categories have typically been approached by historians and anthropologists. At once a historical ethnography of the Netherlands Indies from the 1830s to the 1930s and a meditation on what Stoler calls “the conceptual methodology” such a venture requires, Along the Archival Grain questions the conventions of archives, and the conventions that have governed how scholars draw on them. Stoler argues for a “move away from treating archives as an extractive exercise to an ethnographic one," calling for immersion rather than uncovering, and challenging scholars to take the “surface” and its shifting colonial common sense seriously by engaging with the uncertainties, anxieties, and fantasies of the state.

Along the Archival Grain marks the strong philosophical inflection in Stoler's approach to history, at once an injunction against scholars becoming too certain about their objects of inquiry and too comfortable with their epistemologies, lest they uncritically traffic in the very categories that underwrote governance and miss the “epistemic anxieties” and incompetencies of imperial rule.

==== Imperial Debris: On Ruins and Ruination ====
Imperial Debris: On Ruins and Ruination inquires into the ways that empire bears on the present, asking what analytic purchase “ruination” might have for colonial and postcolonial studies. Edited by Stoler and published in 2013 by Duke University Press, this collection of essays began as a 2006 conference at the New School and a special issue of Cultural Anthropology in 2008.

Like Stoler's other edited volumes, Imperial Debris brings scholars from a range of disciplines, periods, and geographies together in an effort to shake off tired formulations and refocus attention on the enduring conceptual and material scars of empire. As she writes in the introduction, the point of this collaborative engagement with ruins and ruination is “not to suggest that complex histories of capitalism and empire should all be folded into an imperial genealogy,” but rather to examine “the evasive history of empire that disappears so easily into other appellations and other, more available, contemporary terms." Imperial Debris contributed to and reconfigured debates about why colonialism and empire matter in the present and what it takes to grapple with their corrosive consequences.

Contributors to the volume are Nancy Rose Hunt, E. Valentine Daniel, Greg Grandin, Sharad Chari, John Collins, Ariella Azoulay, Gastón Gordillo, Joseph Masco, Vyjayanthi Rao, and Ann Laura Stoler.

==== Duress: Imperial Durabilities in Our Times ====
Published by Duke University Press in 2016, Duress: Imperial Durabilities in Our Times, is Stoler's first monograph since the launch of the collective project Political Concepts: A Critical Lexicon in 2012, of which she is a founding member, and reflects her ongoing collaborations with philosophers, political theorists, and literary scholars in the project's various venues, including its journal, conferences, and two edited volumes.

In the book, Stoler is concerned with the “methodological renovations” that might better equip scholars to recognize and pursue the contemporary coordinates of colonial “duress”. She provides an opening to think about the temporalities of imperial effects, what concept-work enables and what concepts can foreclose. Arguing that Foucault's genealogical method often has been superficially harnessed by (post)colonial studies, she identifies “recursive analytics” as an overlooked and undertheorized aspect of his work.

Across ten chapters, Stoler tracks how imperial duress marks the conditions of political life and the conceptual vocabularies with which its spatiotemporal coordinates have been more and less known, from the nineteenth century Dutch East Indies to 1990s France and contemporary Palestine.

== Books ==
- Capitalism and Confrontation in Sumatra's Plantation Belt, 1870–1979 (Ann Arbor: University of Michigan Press, 1985)
- Race and the Education of Desire: Foucault's History of Sexuality and the Colonial Order of Things (Durham: Duke University Press, 1995)
- Carnal Knowledge and Imperial power: Race and the Intimate in Colonial Rule (Berkeley: University of California Press, 2002)
- Along the Archival Grain: Epistemic Anxieties and Colonial Common Sense (Princeton, NJ: Princeton University Press, 2009)
- La Chair de l’Empire (Paris: La Decouverte, 2013)
- Repenser le Colonialisme with Frederick Cooper (Paris: Payot, 2013)
- Duress: Imperial Durabilities in Our Times (Durham: Duke University Press, 2016)
- Au Coeur de l’Archive Colonial: Questions de Méthode (Paris: EHESS, 2019)
- Interior Frontiers: Essays on the Entrails of Inequality (Oxford: Oxford University Press, 2022)

== Edited volumes ==
- Tensions of Empire: Colonial Cultures in a Bourgeois World with Frederick Cooper (Berkeley: University of California Press, 1997)
- Haunted by Empire: Geographies of Intimacy in North American History (Durham: Duke University Press, 2006)
- Imperial Formations with Carole McGranahan and Peter C. Perdue (Santa Fe, NM: School for Advanced Research Press, 2007)
- Imperial Debris: On Ruin and Ruination (Durham: Duke University Press, 2013)
- Political Concepts: A Critical Lexicon, eds. J.M.Bernstein, Adi Ophir, Ann Laura Stoler (New York: Fordham, 2018)
- Thinking with Balibar: A Lexicon of Conceptual Practice, eds. Ann Laura Stoler, Stathis Gourgouris, Jacques Lezra (New York: Fordham, 2020)

== See also ==
- Interview with Ann Laura Stoler by E. Valentine Daniel, Public Culture 24:3 (2012)
