= Ohio State Route 118 =

State highway in western Ohio, US

State Route 118

Route information
- Maintained by ODOT
- Length: 55.30 mi (89.00 km)

Major junctions
- South end: SR 49 / SR 571 / SR 121 / SR 502 in Greenville
- US 33 in Rockford
- North end: US 127 in Van Wert

Location
- Country: United States
- State: Ohio
- Counties: Darke, Mercer, Van Wert

Highway system
- Ohio State Highway System; Interstate; US; State; Scenic
← SR 117	→ SR 119

Ohio State Route 118 (SR 118) is a 55.30-mile (89.00 km) long north–south state highway in western Ohio, connecting the cities of Greenville and Van Wert. SR 118 runs northward through Darke, Mercer and Van Wert counties, starting from a roundabout with SR 49, SR 571, SR 121 and SR 502 in Greenville. The route crosses through the farming villages of Ansonia, St. Henry, Rossburg and Ohio City as well as the villages of Coldwater and Rockford. Just north of Rossburg, SR 118 serves Eldora Speedway, a clay oval racetrack owned by NASCAR driver Tony Stewart. The northern terminus of SR 118 is at a junction with U.S. Route 127 in the city of Van Wert.

== Route description ==
=== Darke County ===
SR 118 begins at a roundabout with SR 49 (South Broadway), SR 121 (East Main Street), SR 502 (West Main Street) and SR 571 in the city of Greenville. After the roundabout, SR 118, SR 49 and SR 571 are concurrent along South Broadway, a two lane commercial street through Greenville . The moniker changes to North Broadway near the junction with East Water Street, passing south of Treaty of Greenville State Park. Just to the northwest of the park, SR 49 and SR 571 turn west along North Main Street while SR 118 turns north on North Broadway. After North Main, the route is a two-lane residential street, passing numerous housing complexes on each side of the roadway. North of Harke Drive, SR 118 leaves the city of Greenville.

Now in the rural sections of Darke County north of Greenville, SR 118 continues north, crossing County Road 33 (CR 33, named Children's Home–Bradford Road). For several miles, the route passes farms, paralleling a railroad line to the north into the village of Ansonia. In Ansonia, SR 118 gains the South Main Street moniker, becoming a two-lane residential street through the village, crossing a railroad line in the center of the community. Several blocks north of the railroad tracks, SR 118 meets an intersection with SR 47 (Canal Street). The route then crosses the Stillwater River and its north fork, which marks the northern end of Ansonia. SR 118 continues north through the farms of Darke County, crossing the North Fork of the Stillwater River once again just south of a junction with CR 94 (Brown Road).

SR 118 and the North Fork now parallel each other, continuing north through the county. After a junction with CR 38 (Brock–Cosmos Road), SR 118 enters the village of Rossburg, gaining the moniker of South Main Street for a block. SR 118 through Rossburg is a two-lane residential street running north–south through the village. Similar to Ansonia, SR 118 crosses over the North Fork of the Stillwater and leaves Rossburg. North of Rossburg, SR 118 returns to the rural region of Darke County, crossing several county routes before crossing the Wabash River. Just after crossing the Wabash River, the route passes the entrances to Eldora Speedway, a 1/2 mile clay oval race track owned by NASCAR driver Tony Stewart.

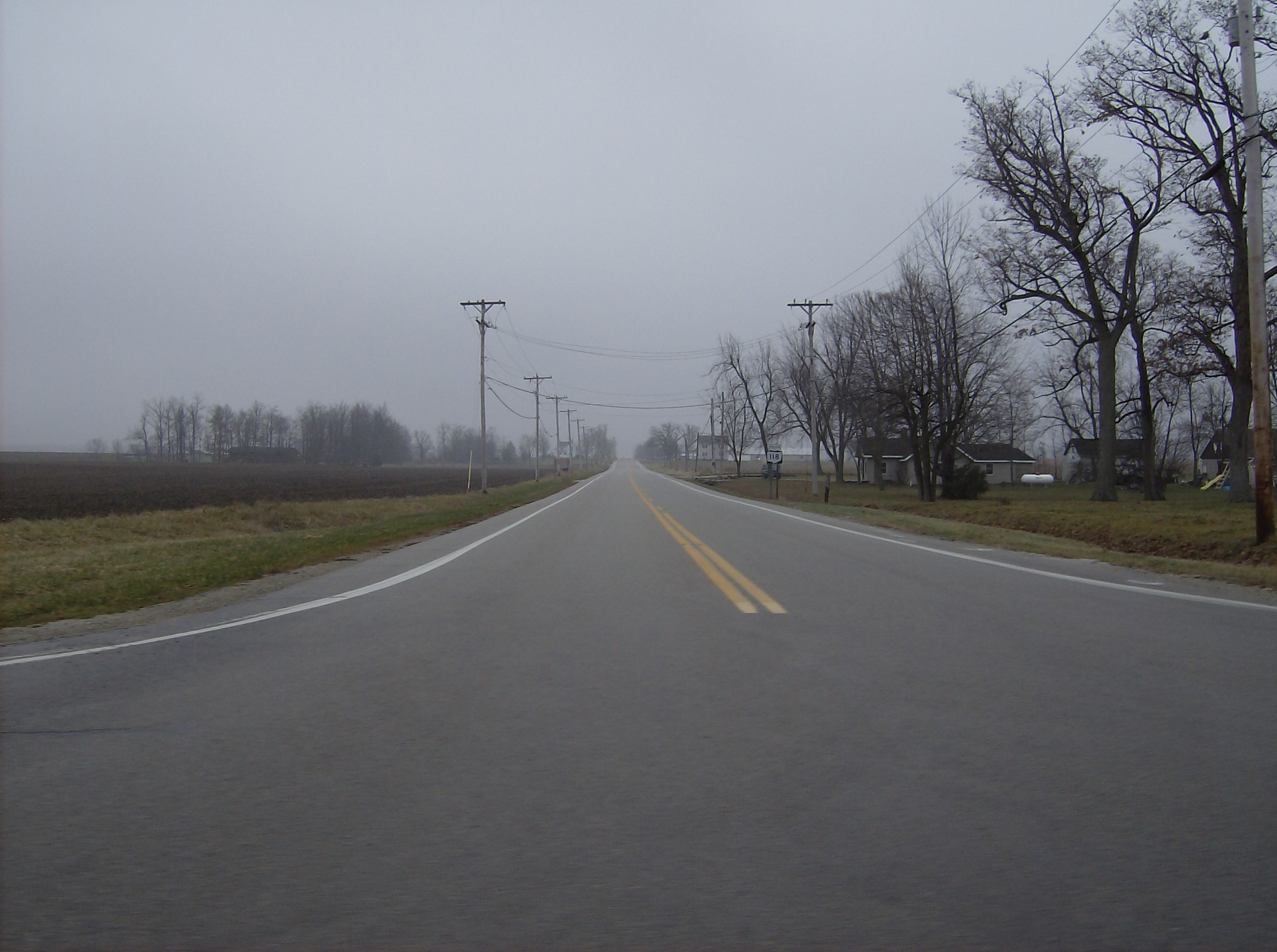
SR 118 at the intersection with SR 705 near New Weston in northern Darke County

After Eldora Speedway, SR 118 continues north through Allen Township, passing just east of the village of New Weston. In Allen Township, SR 118 reaches an intersection with SR 705 (Main Street), which serves as the main street through New Weston. The route continues north from SR 705 through Allen Township, bending northeast near Gibson Road and bypassing the village of Burkettsville. Along this northeastern stretch of SR 118, the route junctions with the eastern terminus of SR 319 (Mercer Darke County Line Road). After SR 319, SR 118 crosses the county line from Darke County to Mercer County and turns northward through the farmlands.

=== Mercer County ===
Now in Granville Township, SR 118 remains rural for several miles, before crossing an intersection with Beckman Avenue. At Beckman Avenue, SR 118 crosses into St. Henry, gaining the moniker of South Eastern Avenue, passing St. Henry High School and a junction with SR 119. SR 118 continues north through St. Henry, becoming a two-lane village street through the community, which the route leaves near Carthagena Road. About 3 miles north of St. Henry, SR 118 gains the name of South Second Street and crosses into the village of Coldwater. Through Coldwater, SR 118 is a two-lane residential street, reaching a junction with SR 219 (Main Street) in the center of the village. A block to the north, the route crosses a railroad line and leaves the village near Bell Road.

SR 118 continues north through Jefferson Township as a two-lane residential and rural roadway. Several miles north of Coldwater, SR 118 reaches a junction with SR 29, where SR 118 and SR 29 become concurrent, turning westward for several blocks. After SR 118 turns north from SR 29, it continues through Jefferson Township for several miles of farmland. Passing through the small rural community of Tama, the route enters Hopewell Township and crosses an intersection with SR 707. A couple miles north of SR 707, SR 118 crosses into the village of Rockford, becoming a two-lane residential street through the village. Just north of the junction with Sugar Street, the route meets with US 33, which turns north along SR 118.

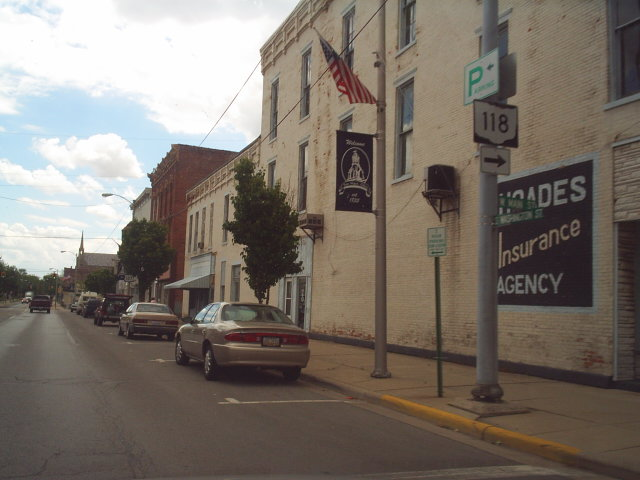
OH 118 junction with US 127 in the city of Van Wert, seen from US 127 southbound

US 33 and SR 118 continue north through Rockford, becoming the main street through the village. At the northern end of Rockford, US 33 turns west towards the Indiana state line, while SR 118 continues north through the northern reaches of Mercer County, crossing a junction with the western terminus of SR 117. Running along a northeastern stretch of roadway, SR 118 runs through a rural section of Dublin Township before crossing the line from Mercer County to Van Wert County. Now in Liberty Township, SR 118 remains a two-lane rural roadway, crossing a four-way junction with SR 81. Less than a mile north of a junction with Township Highway 36, SR 118 crosses into the village of Ohio City.

=== Van Wert County ===
In Ohio City, SR 118 crosses northeast through the village as South Shanes Street, a two-lane residential street through the center. Just north of Railroad Street, the route crosses the former right-of-way for the Erie Railroad, several blocks west of the former station site. At the railroad junction, SR 118 also crosses the western terminus of SR 709 (West Carmean Street). Just north of Lambert Street, SR 118 leaves the village of Ohio City. After Ohio City, SR 118 continues northeast through Liberty Township, turning northward at a junction with CR 70 (Wren Landeck Road). Now in Pleasant Township, SR 118 turns northeast again, cutting through farmlands before gaining the moniker of South Shannon Street as it reaches the city of Van Wert.

Now in Van Wert, the county seat of the namesake county, SR 118 becomes South Shannon Street, a primarily residential street in the southwestern stretches of the village. After passing the Homestead Gardens Apartments, the route enters a large commercial section of Van Wert, passing multiple strip malls that surround the roadway near the junction with Ervin Road. Continuing northeast through the village, SR 118 becomes residential once again, crossing over a railroad line near Gordon Avenue. At the junction with West Main Street, SR 118 turns east on West Main Street, passing north of Fountain Park. Just a block from Fountain Park, SR 118 reaches a junction with US 127 (North Washington Street), marking the northern terminus of SR 118.

== Major intersections ==
County	Location	mi	km	Destinations	Notes
Darke	Greenville	0.00	0.00	SR 49 / SR 571 (South Broadway) / SR 121 (East Main Street) / SR 502 (West Main Street)	Roundabout. South end of concurrency with SR 49 and SR 571. Northern terminus of SR 502.
Darke	Greenville	0.56	0.90	SR 49 / SR 571 (North Main Street)	North end of concurrency with SR 49 and SR 571.
Darke	Ansonia	8.09	13.02	SR 47 (Canal Street)	
Darke	New Weston	16.61	26.73	SR 705 (Main Street)	
Darke	Allen Township	17.67	28.44	SR 319 (Darke Mercer County Line Road)	Eastern terminus of SR 319.
Mercer	St. Henry	22.28	35.86	SR 119	
Mercer	Coldwater	26.56	42.74	SR 219 (Main Street)	
Mercer	Jefferson Township	31.10	50.05	SR 29	East end of concurrency with SR 29.
Mercer	Jefferson Township	32.10	51.66	SR 29	West end of concurrency with SR 29.
Mercer	Dublin Township	39.67	63.84	SR 707	
Mercer	Rockford	38.89	62.59	US 33	South end of concurrency with US 33.
Mercer	Rockford	39.40	63.41	US 33	North end of concurrency with US 33.
Mercer	Dublin Township	42.68	68.69	SR 117	Western terminus of SR 117.
Van Wert	Liberty Township	45.83	73.76	SR 81	
Van Wert	Ohio City	47.89	77.07	SR 709 (West Carmean Street)	Western terminus of SR 709.
Van Wert	Van Wert	55.30	89.00	US 127 (North Washington Street)	
1.000 mi = 1.609 km; 1.000 km = 0.621 mi: Concurrency terminus
