= Mike Davis (scholar) =

American historian and social critic (1946–2022)

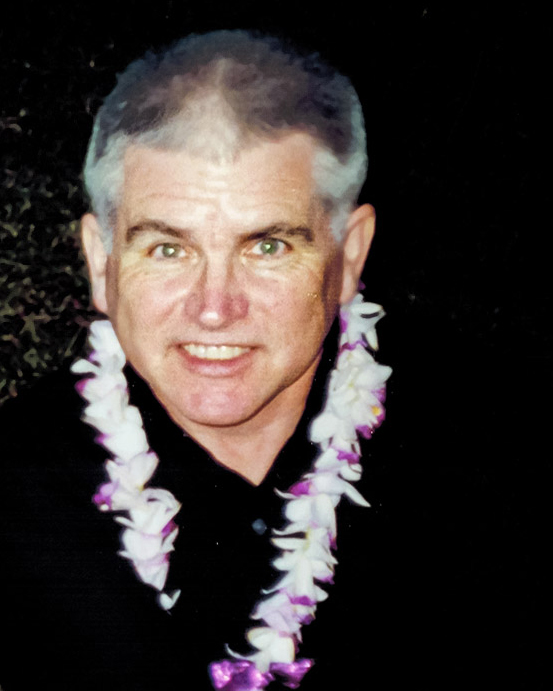
- Born: Michael Ryan Davis; March 10, 1946; Fontana, California, U.S.
- Died: October 25, 2022 (aged 76); San Diego, California, U.S.
- Occupations: Public intellectual; urban theorist; writer; Marxist historian

Education
- Education: University of California, Los Angeles (BA, MA)

Philosophical work
- School: Critical geography; Marxism
- Main interests: Urban geography; Environmental economics; Marxism; Historical materialism; Labor history; Political violence; Economic history

Michael Ryan Davis (March 10, 1946 – October 25, 2022) was an American public intellectual, urban theorist, writer, and Marxist historian based in Southern California. He was best known for his investigations of power and social class in works such as City of Quartz and Late Victorian Holocausts, which connected political economy to social crises. His last two non-fiction books were Set the Night on Fire: L.A. in the Sixties, co-authored by Jon Wiener, and The Monster Enters: COVID-19, Avian Flu, and the Plagues of Capitalism (February 2022).

Growing up in Fontana and Bostonia in California, Davis left school at age 16 to support his working-class family after his father suffered a heart attack. He later graduated as a valedictorian and won a scholarship to Reed College. There he struggled academically, but became heavily involved in student civil rights activism as a member of the Congress of Racial Equality (CORE). He spent a decade working as a truck driver and a organizer of left-wing political activism before returning to study economics and history at the University of California, Los Angeles on a union scholarship. He later worked at the Getty Research Institute and began writing seriously in the late 1990s.

Davis would later teach as Distinguished Professor Emeritus in the Department of Creative Writing at the University of California, Riverside. He was an editor of the New Left Review, and wrote for a variety of British and American journals, including The Nation, the New Left Review, Jacobin, Socialist Review and the New Statesman. He won the Lannan Literary Award for Nonfiction in 2007.

== Biography ==
=== Early life: 1946–1964 ===
==== Background and childhood ====
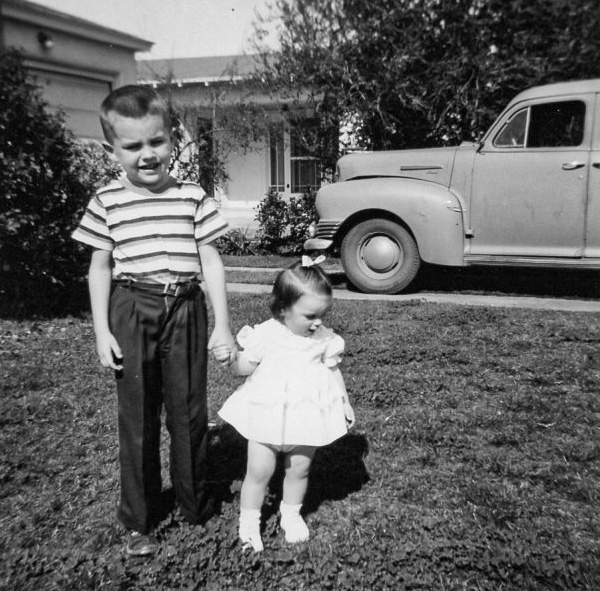
Davis, left, in his childhood, c. late 1950s

Michael Ryan Davis was born in Fontana, California, on March 10, 1946, to Dwight and Mary (née Ryan) Davis. Dwight was from Venedocia, Ohio, and was of Welsh and Protestant background. He was a trade-union Democrat and an "anti-racist," which Davis attributed to his ancestors, Welsh abolitionists and Union soldiers who had settled in the Black Swamp of Ohio. Mary was an Irish Catholic from Columbus, Ohio, and the daughter of Jack Ryan, a veteran of the Spanish–American War. Both parents hitchhiked to California during the Great Depression and came to the El Cajon Valley, but moved to Fontana for a brief period during the Second World War and after.

Returning to San Diego County in 1953, Davis was raised in a tract home in the community of Bostonia. (Note: Annexed to El Cajon in 1953) His father Dwight worked in the wholesale meat industry for the Superior Meat Company in downtown San Diego and was a member of the meat cutter's union, and his uncle ran a wholesale meat company. The nearly all-white neighborhood of Davis's childhood was populated by refugees of the Great Depression, mostly Southern Baptist families from Oklahoma and Texas, and had a country-western ballroom and rodeo. Davis identified with his community as a "redneck" and a "Westerner" in opposition to the "surfer" beach culture held by the wealthier, Methodist neighborhoods south of El Cajon's Main Street. Racism and anti-communism were endemic in the town, but Democrats held the dominant political role in the community due to the influence of the Machinists Union.

Dwight Davis was an amateur geologist, and would bring the young Davis with him on frequent excursions in the Colorado Desert to search for uranium deposits, abandoned mines, geodes, and petrified wood. The favorite stop in the desert for the two was the Ocotillo Wells gas station and café, owned by an eccentric elderly proprietor who would debate baseball with Dwight. In 1955, the young Davis was curious about several photos of cadavers taken by the proprietor and posted on the bulletin board in the café. The proprietor explained to Davis that the bodies were of young Mexican men, all executed in arroyos along the border by being shot in the back. Davis remained haunted by the photos of the corpses, and the experience would influence his ideas on the border for the rest of his life.

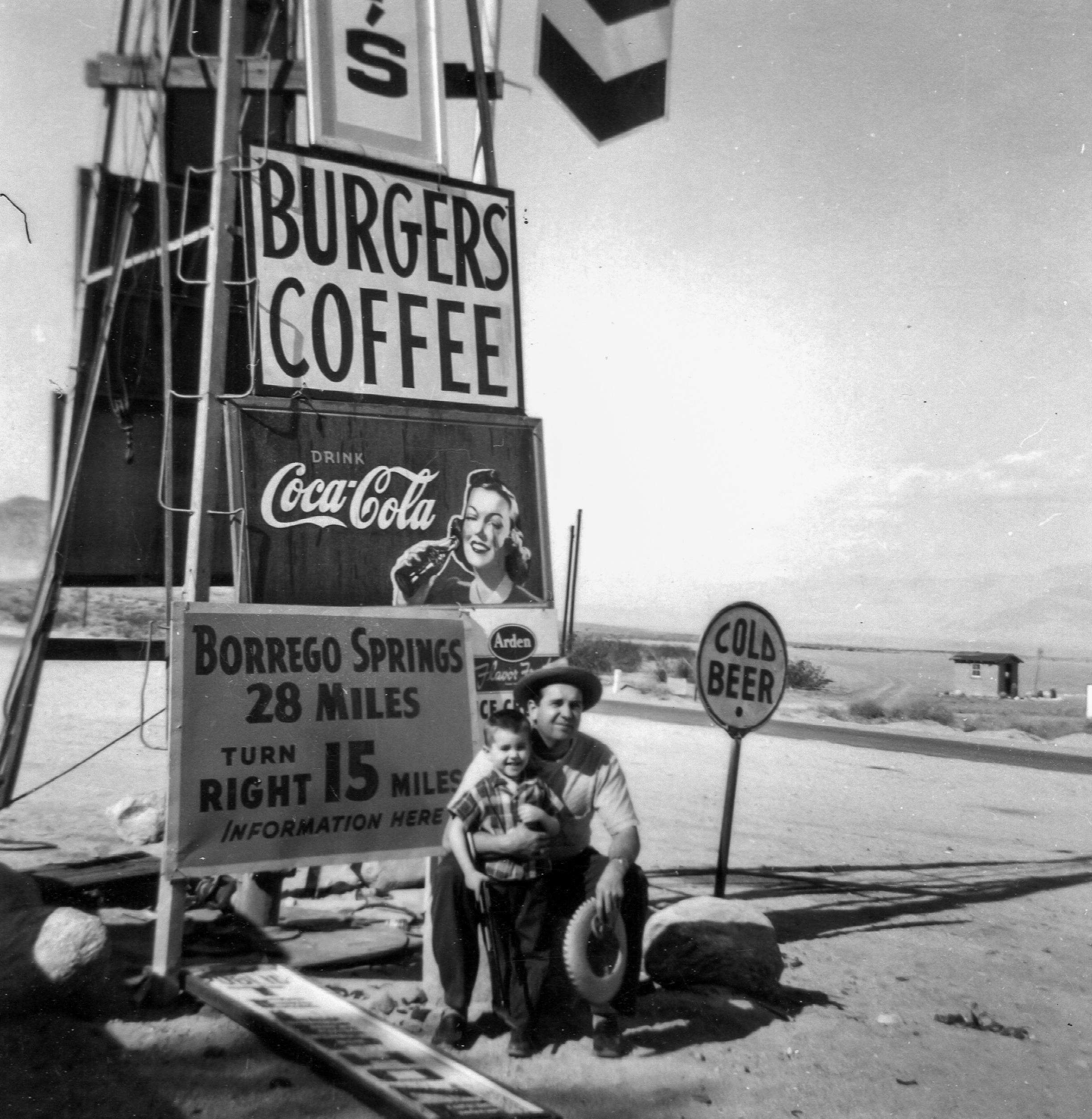
Davis with his father, Dwight Davis, in front of the café at Shelter Valley, 1952

Davis described the family home as absent of books save for the Vulgate Bible, but his parents were avid readers of newspapers and Reader's Digest. The family were among the few Catholics in the neighborhood, and the young Davis often found himself in fistfights with his fundamentalist neighbors, which contributed to him renouncing religion at the age of 10 and gravitating towards science with the advent of Sputnik. Davis was a patriotic and conservative pre-adolescent, enlisting in the Marine Corps Base Camp Pendleton's "Devil Pups" program, and until he was 15, had a picture of Edward Teller, the "father of the hydrogen bomb" on his wall.

Davis's patriotic phase was eroded by the dysfunction in his suburban Bostonia. At 12, Davis witnessed the aftermath of the Pendergast murders near his home, where five members of a family, including four children, were murdered by Carl Eder. Davis recalled the scene as if "...somebody had taken a bucket of red paint and thrown it on the walls." Davis also faced difficulties with a childhood bully in his neighborhood, Gordon Neumann, who was hostile to children, and would later go on to shoot six, killing one of them, and then killing a woman before burning himself to death in 1993. Neumann, who was much older, had previously attacked Davis in second grade, but he was rescued by his father who "almost killed" Neumann. Domestic violence was present in the community but never discussed, and he recalled hearing women and children being frequently beaten while in his backyard in the evenings.

==== Teenage years ====
In high school, Davis became interested in history from the stories of his teachers, who were World War II veterans. He was eventually exposed to John Hersey's Hiroshima, a reading which challenged all of his ideas on patriotism and the United States. At 16, his father suffered a catastrophic heart attack which undermined the family's financial security. Davis had to leave school to provide for the family by working as a delivery truck driver for his uncle's wholesale meat company, delivering to restaurants throughout San Diego County.

After his father's heart attack, Davis entered a brooding and troubled period, and was mostly interested in drag racing, Kerouac, and taking bullfighting classes. Davis drank, raced, and stole cars with his friends, which culminated in a near-fatal car accident when he drove his Ford into a brick wall during a drag race, leaving him with a permanent 12 in (30 cm) scar on his left thigh. Concurrently, while delivering to restaurants across San Diego's East County, he met Lee Gregovich, an older communist and Wobbly whose family emigrated from the Dalmatian coast to work in the copper mines of the American southwest. Gregovich was blacklisted from many employers by the HUAC, (Note: Lee Gregovich (June 14, 1904 – 1990) arrived in the United States in 1912, and was naturalized through his father in Globe, Arizona. At the time of his testimony by the California HUAC in 1954, Gregovich resided in Spring Valley and had lived in San Diego County for over 28 years. He worked as a cook and was a member of the Cooks Union. Gregovich's son fought in the Korean War. Davis alleges that his FBI file insinuated that Gregovich was a Soviet agent; a 1942 HUAC report describes Gregovich as a "lying agent[s] of the Comintern" who was "illustrative" of their "insidious tactics.") but had found a job as a cook at the Chicken Shack, an old-style roadhouse in Julian. The Chicken Shack was the most distant customer Davis delivered to, leading to a weekly ritual: after Davis put the order in the walk-in, Gregovich would provide Davis with red wine and the two would talk. At the end of every discussion, Gregovich urged the young Davis to "read Marx!"

The "alcoholic, delinquent, and suicidal" Davis was then invited to a Congress of Racial Equality (CORE) demonstration at the Bank of America in downtown San Diego at the behest of his cousin, who had married the Black civil rights activist Jim Stone. The group was doused in lighter fluid and threatened with ignition by a group of sailors, before members of the Nation of Islam rescued them from the fray. Davis described the 1962 demonstration as his "burning bush moment." Under the guidance of Stone, Davis returned to high school and began working at the San Diego chapter of CORE, to commendation from Gregovich. Davis graduated as one of three valedictorians of El Cajon Valley High, and earned a full scholarship to Reed College.

=== Young activist: 1964–1968 ===
==== New York and Oakland ====
At Reed College, Davis was overwhelmed, alienated by the hippy culture and struggling academically. He joined the Portland, Oregon chapter of CORE, which included the labor historian Jeremy Brecher, who at the time was one of few members of the nascent Students for a Democratic Society (SDS) in the Pacific Northwest. Living "drunk" in the dorm of a girlfriend for five weeks, Davis was expelled from Reed for intervisitation. Davis was eligible for the draft after his expulsion and passed the physical, but he was rejected after he insisted to the personnel at the induction center he belonged to several subversive organizations. After reading the Port Huron Statement, and at the recommendation of Brecher, Davis boarded a Greyhound bus to New York City to join the national office of SDS, arriving in November 1964. In 1964 and 1965, Davis worked in the national office of SDS, which was becoming overwhelmed by the growing number of chapters. The national council meetings gave the office the responsibility to organize two major demonstrations, an Anti-Apartheid sit-in and the first march on Washington in protest of the Vietnam War.

Davis was one of the chief coordinators behind the anti-Apartheid sit-in at Chase Manhattan Bank. In the aftermath of the Sharpeville massacre, Chase Manhattan had led a consortium of international banks that bailed out the Apartheid government of South Africa. The chief ally and tactical organizer to the sit-in was the New York chapter of the Student Nonviolent Coordinating Committee (SNCC), headed by Betita Martinez (then Elisabeth Sutherland), who Davis became acquainted with. Other supporters included exiled members of the African National Congress and young members of the Tanzanian mission to the United Nations. On the Friday afternoon of March 19, 1965, some 600 demonstrators marched on Chase Manhattan's offices, with 43 arrested, in what was SDS's first act of civil disobedience.

Davis returned to California in early 1965, arriving in the Bay Area during the transformation of the Free Speech Movement into the Vietnam Day Committee. His only subsistence for the next six months was money earned by selling literature sent to him by the SDS national office. The demand for radical literature by students in the Bay Area was enough that Davis could afford to rent a derelict house with no electricity. While couch surfing in the homes of academics, he became aware of Herbert Marcuse, who was lauded by the organizers of the Free Speech Movement. Davis had struggled to understand any of Marcuse's One-Dimensional Man, but opted to write a letter to the respected academic about the accomplishments and motives of SDS. Marcuse responded, but was critical, suggesting that SDS was only serving to advance Lyndon B. Johnson's War on Poverty, and that the organization should seek a more oppositional approach. While in Oakland, Davis burned his draft card in protest of Johnson's intervention in the Dominican Republic.

==== Los Angeles and Texas ====
In June 1965, after burning his draft card, Davis was sent by the SDS national committee to Los Angeles, where he was ordered to assist in organizing protestors against the construction of the 210 freeway through a historically Black neighborhood in Pasadena. Davis and other SDS members also organized weekly meetings to spread awareness about the draft on local campuses. Working in South Los Angeles, he befriended Levi Kingston, a former jazz bassist and radicalized sailor from the Merchant Marine. Kingston previously ran a coffeehouse, Pogo's Swamp, which served as a local hub for beatniks and radical students at Los Angeles City College, including the future founder of US Organization, Ron Everett. Kingston connected Davis with local activists in South Central, and the two worked together organizing draft resistance and doing draft counseling. On August 16, 1965, during the Watts uprising, Kingston was shot at by a vigilante from the roof of a fraternity house of USC. Davis was at Kingston's side during the shooting, and noted that Kingston, who was Black, was the only one targeted. Kingston later organized a Black draft resistance organization, the Freedom Draft Movement, and remained close friends with Davis for the rest of his life. Davis viewed Kingston as his "big brother" and one of the major figures in his life, and would dedicate his last book, Set the Night on Fire, to Kingston, who died shortly before it was published.

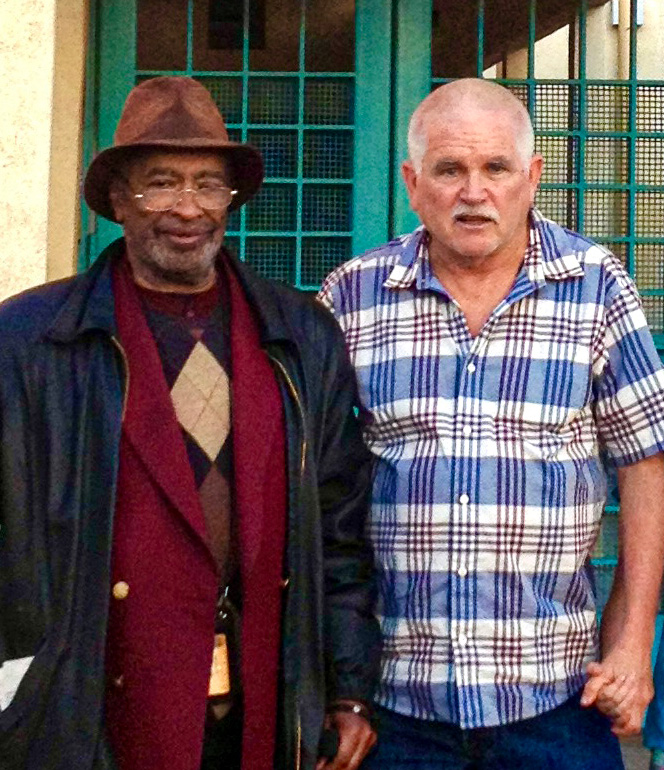
Mike Davis, right, with Levi Kingston in Los Angeles

In 1966, 19-year-old Davis, characterized as a "draft card-burning SDS leader," debated actor Kirk Douglas on Melvin Belli's talk show. The section of an article in the Los Angeles Times on the debate, titled "Outtalked by 19-Year-Old," described Davis "...to have much less trouble stating his case then either Belli or Douglas," while Douglas "...was having some difficulty being articulate on his own behalf." In his recollection on the appearance, Davis, the first to be on, was confronted by Douglas as he was leaving the studio. Douglas allegedly called him a "commie dupe." Davis responded by telling Douglas that he admired his appearance in Paths of Glory, but questioned why the actor would star in an anti-war film while serving as a goodwill ambassador for the Johnson administration in Southeast Asia. According to Davis, Douglas was "speechless."

As the Southern California regional organizer in 1966, Davis organized protests in support of the anti-war and civil rights movement. The first, in February, was a rally in solidarity with Julian Bond and the peace demonstrations in the South, meant to bring closer ties between the peace and civil rights movements. In May, Davis helped organize a protest against the manufacture of napalm used in the Vietnam War by Dow Chemical, with SDS picketing the Dow Chemical plant in Torrance in coordination with other national protests originating from the Stanford Committee for Peace in Viet Nam. The Torrance picket was countered by demonstrators from the Victory in Vietnam Association, headed by local chapter leader Dana Rohrabacher. Davis also frequently spoke on behalf of SDS in public debates and conferences on world affairs and social revolutions.

In 1967, Davis briefly left Los Angeles to organize for SDS in Texas, and lived in Austin. While in Texas, Davis sought out the populist news editor Archer Fullingham. At the time, Davis was still wary of Marxism and the number of his friends who were becoming Marxists, and instead was interested in the idea of reviving the Populist Party. He approached Fullingham at his residence in Kountze, and proposed the idea to the editor, suggesting that Fullingham could be the leader of the party. According to Davis, Fullingham rebuked him, calling him "...one of the dumbest piss-ants I've ever met," and suggested Davis "figure out this stuff for yourself."

In late 1967 and 1968, Davis returned to Los Angeles and joined the Southern California District of the Communist Party, headed by Dorothy Healey, in solidarity with their stand against the Soviet invasion of Czechoslovakia. He left SDS after the 1969 "Days of Rage," and looked back on the achievements of the movement with ambivalence.

His education was punctuated by stints as a meat cutter, truck driver, and a Congress of Racial Equality (CORE) and Students for a Democratic Society (SDS) activist. At 28, Davis returned to college, studying economics and history at the University of California, Los Angeles on a union scholarship. Davis earned his BA and MA degrees, but did not complete the PhD program in history.

== Career ==
Davis was a 1996–1997 Getty Scholar at the Getty Research Institute and received a MacArthur Fellowship Award in 1998. He won the Lannan Literary Award for Nonfiction in 2007.

Davis was Distinguished Professor Emeritus in the Department of Creative Writing at the University of California, Riverside, and an editor of the New Left Review. Davis taught urban theory at the Southern California Institute of Architecture and at Stony Brook University before he secured a position at University of California, Irvine's history department. He also contributed to the British monthly Socialist Review, the organ of the British Socialist Workers Party. As a journalist and essayist, Davis wrote for a number of well-known publications, including The Nation, the New Left Review, Jacobin, and the UK's New Statesman.

Davis was a self-defined international socialist and "Marxist-Environmentalist". He wrote in the tradition of socialists/architects/regionalism advocates such as Lewis Mumford and Garrett Eckbo, whom he cited in Ecology of Fear. His early book, Prisoners of the American Dream, was an important contribution to the Marxist study of U.S. history, political economy, and the state, as well as to the doctrine of revolutionary integrationism.

Davis was also the author of two fiction books for young adults: Land of the Lost Mammoths and Pirates, Bats and Dragons.

== Reception ==
Reviewers have praised Davis' prose style and his exposés of economic, social, environmental and political injustice. His book Planet of Slums inspired a special issue of Mute magazine on global slums. The Los Angeles Public Library described him in an obituary as a "towering left-wing polemicist... most closely associated with a synthesis of urbanism, political theory, and historical materialism with an acid tongue".

A real estate agent from Malibu named Brady Westwater waged a crusade against Davis, which resulted in critical articles in the Downtown News, New Times, Salon.com, The Economist and the Los Angeles Times. Several of these authors were civic boosters upset that the city was getting a negative reputation.

According to Todd Purdum in the New York Times, Davis "acknowledged fabricating an entire conversation with a local environmentalist, ...for a cover story he wrote for L.A. Weekly a decade before (in the late 1980s); he defended it as an early attempt at journalistic scene-setting." However, in his October 2004 Geography article, "That Certain Feeling: Mike Davis, Truth and the City," Kevin Stannard held that this "controversy is explained by Davis's ambiguous balancing of academic research and reportage".

Jon Wiener has defended Davis in The Nation, maintaining that his critics are political opponents exaggerating the significance of small errors.

Some academic leftists have also criticized Davis's focus on modern urban structures. In a review essay on City of Quartz, geographer Cindi Katz criticized its apocalypticism as masculinist and tied it to the flattening of people's subjectivity as they are made into "characters" more than social actors. Citing Jane Jacobs' attacks upon Lewis Mumford in her Death and Life of Great American Cities, Andy Merrifield (MetroMarxism, Routledge 2002) wrote that Davis' analysis was "harsh" (p. 170). Davis' work, particularly Planet of Slums, has been criticized by Merrifield and urban studies professor Tom Angotti as "anti-urban" and "overly apocalyptic".

These critics charge that Davis failed to focus on activist groups among the poor and working class in solving problems—as advocated by Manuel Castells and Marshall Berman.

== Personal life and death ==
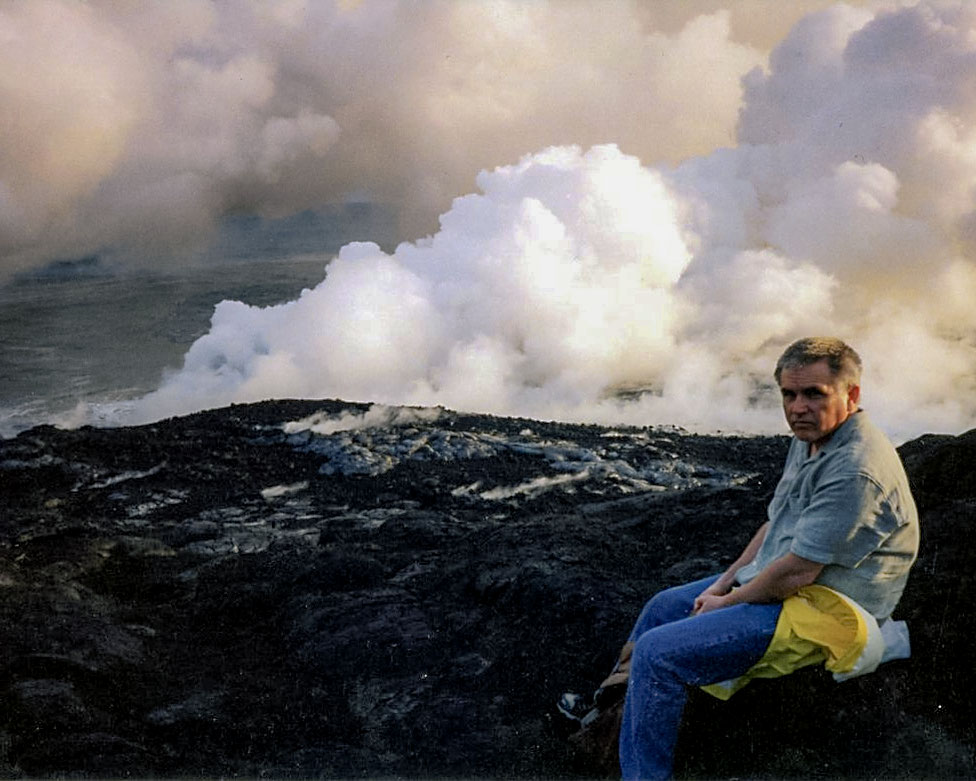
Davis at Kīlauea in Hawai'i

Davis was married five times. His first four marriages ended in divorce. Davis met his first wife in SDS, who had returned from the 1964 "Freedom Summer" in Mississippi trying to organize tugboat crews. Davis's final marriage to Mexican artist and professor Alessandra Moctezuma lasted until his death. Davis and Moctezuma lived in San Diego, California. He had one child with his third wife Brigid Loughran, one child with his fourth wife Sophie Spalding, and two children with Moctezuma.

Davis was diagnosed with cancer in 2020. In a July 25, 2022, story in The Los Angeles Times, Davis said, "I'm in the terminal stage of metastatic esophageal cancer but still up and around the house...I guess what I think about the most is that I'm just extraordinarily furious and angry. If I have a regret, it's not dying in battle or at a barricade as I've always romantically imagined — you know, fighting." He died from esophageal cancer on October 25, 2022, at age 76.

== Awards and honors ==
- 1991: Deutscher Memorial Prize, City of Quartz: Excavating the Future in Los Angeles
- 1996–1997: Getty Scholar at the Getty Research Institute
- 1998: MacArthur Fellowship
- 2002: World History Association Book Prize, Late Victorian Holocausts
- 2007: Lannan Literary Award for Nonfiction

== Works ==
=== Books ===
==== Nonfiction ====
- Prisoners of the American Dream: Politics and Economy in the History of the U.S. Working Class (1986, 1999, 2018)
- City of Quartz: Excavating the Future in Los Angeles (1990, 2006)
- Ecology of Fear: Los Angeles and the Imagination of Disaster (1998)
- Casino Zombies: True Stories From the Neon West (1999, German only)
- Magical Urbanism: Latinos Reinvent the U.S. Big City (2000)
- Late Victorian Holocausts: El Niño Famines and the Making of the Third World (2001)
- The Grit Beneath the Glitter: Tales from the Real Las Vegas, edited with Hal Rothman (2002)
- Dead Cities, And Other Tales (2003)
- Under the Perfect Sun: The San Diego Tourists Never See, with Jim Miller and Kelly Mayhew (2003); (2nd ed, 2026)
- The Monster at Our Door: The Global Threat of Avian Flu (2005)
- Planet of Slums: Urban Involution and the Informal Working Class (2006)
- No One Is Illegal: Fighting Racism and State Violence on the U.S.-Mexico Border, with Justin Akers Chacon (2006)
- Buda's Wagon: A Brief History of the Car Bomb (2007)
- In Praise of Barbarians: Essays against Empire (2007)
- Evil Paradises: Dreamworlds of Neoliberalism, edited with Daniel Bertrand Monk (2007)
- Be Realistic: Demand the Impossible (2012)
- Old Gods, New Enigmas: Marx's Lost Theory (2018)
- Set the Night on Fire: L.A. in the Sixties, co-authored by Jon Wiener (2020)
- The Monster Enters: COVID-19, Avian Flu, and the Plagues of Capitalism (Feb 2022)

==== Fiction ====
- Land of the Lost Mammoths (2003)
- Pirates, Bats, and Dragons (2004)

== Notes ==
=== Citations ===
Awards
Preceded by Arno J. Mayer	Deutscher Memorial Prize; 1991	Succeeded by Len Doyal and Ian Gough
