= Ohio State Route 709 =

State highway in Van Wert County, Ohio, US

State Route 709

Route information
- Maintained by ODOT
- Length: 9.20 mi (14.81 km)
- Existed: 1938–present

Major junctions
- West end: SR 118 in Ohio City
- US 127 near Ohio City
- East end: SR 116 near Venedocia

Location
- Country: United States
- State: Ohio
- Counties: Van Wert

Highway system
- Ohio State Highway System; Interstate; US; State; Scenic
← SR 708	→ SR 710

State Route 709 (SR 709) is an east–west highway in western Ohio. SR 709 exists entirely in southern Van Wert County. Its western terminus is at SR 118 in Ohio City, and its eastern terminus is at SR 116 just south of Venedocia.

== Route description ==
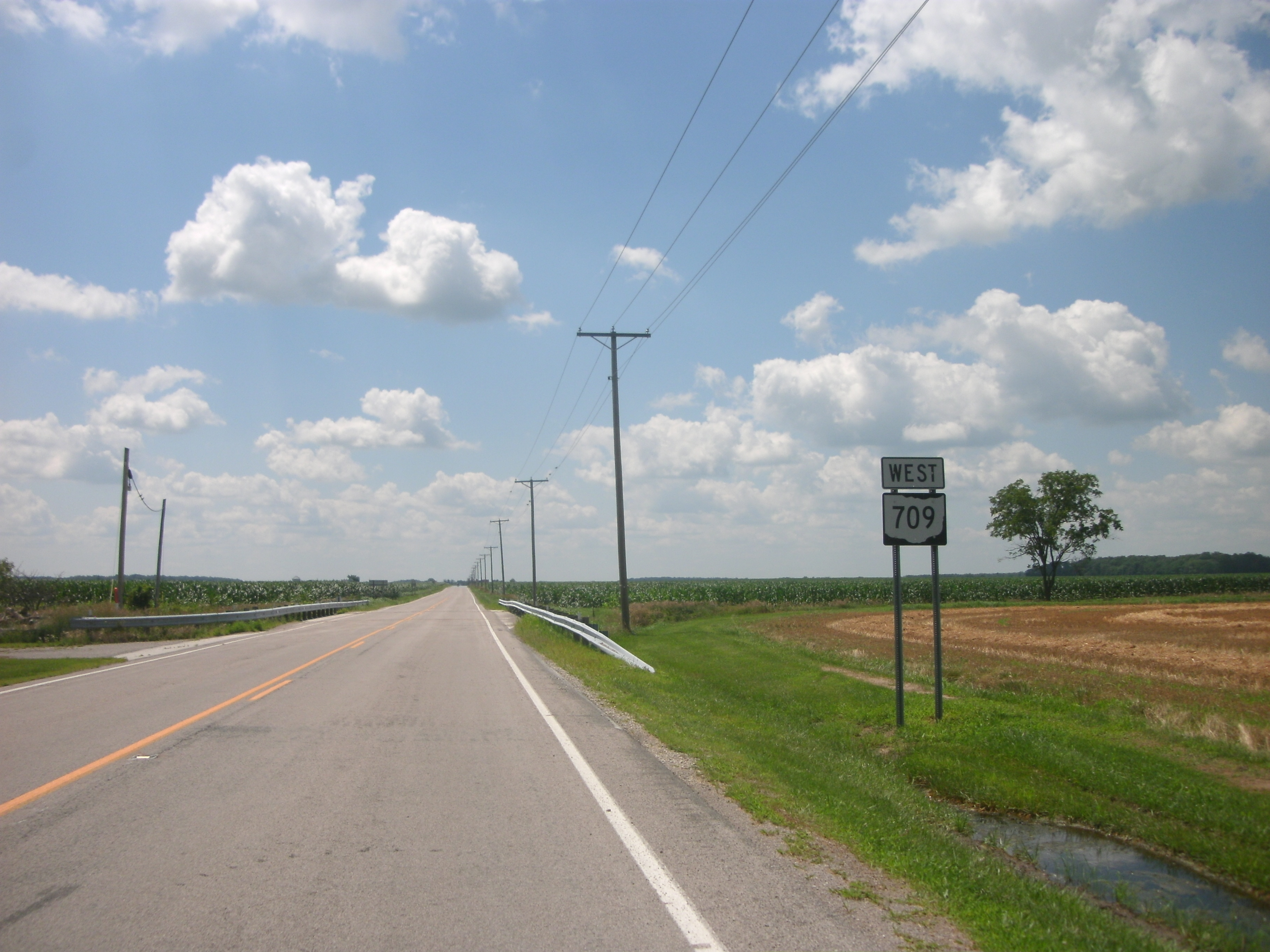
SR 709 westbound from SR 116 near Venedocia

The starting point of SR 709 is at SR 118 in the western part of Ohio City, specifically at the intersection of Shanes Street (SR 118) and Carmean Street (SR 709 east of here). From there, SR 709 heads east along Carmean Street, serving as a primary thoroughfare through the village. Arriving at a T-intersection with Ball Road, SR 709 turns north, and follows Ball Road north. Passing by two side streets, SR 709 departs Ohio City, and enters into rural Liberty Township, where the roadway becomes known as Burris Road. Arriving at the Ohio City-Venedocia Road intersection, SR 709 departs from Burris Road, and turns east onto the intersecting road. Heading away from that intersection, SR 709 passes amid a landscape predominantly ruled by farmland. SR 709 passes its intersection with Flager Road, crosses over the Long Prairie Creek, and arrives at a junction with U.S. Route 127 (US 127).

Going east from US 127, SR 709 follows a brief reverse curve that takes it southeasterly through the Greenville Road (Van Wert County Road 95) intersection, before resuming a due easterly course as it heads into York Township. Following a straight-line path for the remainder of its trek, SR 709 passes through intersections with Mendon Road (County Road 103), Thomas Road and Jonestown Road. Next, the highway crosses the Little Auglaize River amid a split intersection with Jones Hughes Road. Further east, SR 709 meets Goodwin Road, and thereafter comes to an end as it arrives at its intersection with SR 116 on the boundary between York Township and Jennings Township, less than one-quarter mile (0.40 km) south of Venedocia.

== History ==
SR 709 came into existence in 1938, along the routing that it currently occupies between SR 118 and SR 116. No significant changes have taken place to the route since its inception.

== Major intersections ==
The entire route is in Van Wert County.

Location	mi	km	Destinations	Notes
Ohio City	0.00	0.00	SR 118 (Shane Street) / West Carmean Street	
Liberty Township	2.65	4.26	US 127 – Van Wert, Celina	
York–Jennings township line	9.20	14.81	SR 116 (Main Street) – Venedocia, St. Marys	
1.000 mi = 1.609 km; 1.000 km = 0.621 mi
