= Ohio State Route 319 =

State highway in western Ohio, US

State Route 319
- SR 319 highlighted in red

Route information
- Maintained by ODOT
- Length: 0.56 mi (900 m)
- Existed: 1932–present

Major junctions
- West end: Washington Street in Burkettsville
- East end: SR 118 east of Burkettsville

Location
- Country: United States
- State: Ohio
- Counties: Darke, Mercer

Highway system
- Ohio State Highway System; Interstate; US; State; Scenic
← SR 318	→ SR 320

State Route 319 (SR 319) is a very short, two-lane state highway in the western portion of the U.S. state of Ohio. A spur route, SR 319 has its western terminus at an abandoned railroad grade just west of Washington Street in the village of Burkettsville. Its eastern terminus is 0.56 miles (0.90 km) to the east of its western terminus at its junction with SR 118. SR 319 was established in the early 1930s. It started out as a much longer highway, but earlier segments would become a part of SR 118 in the late 1930s.

== Route description ==
For its entire length, SR 319 runs along the boundary between Darke County on the south side and Mercer County on the north side. SR 319 begins in downtown Burkettsville at a former railroad grade just west of Washington Street. Known as Main Street within Burkettsville, the route runs due east through the village's central business district prior to entering a residential area where it intersects a few side streets. After leaving the village of Burkettsville, SR 319 becomes the boundary between Darke County's Allen Township and Mercer County's Granville Township. After a short distance through farmland, the highway comes to an end as it arrives at its junction with SR 118. Continuing east after the route terminates is Darke–Mercer County Line Road.

The Ohio Department of Transportation (ODOT) conducts surveys throughout its highway system to determine traffic volume. This is most commonly expressed as the average annual daily traffic (AADT), or the measure of traffic volume for any average day of the year. In 2010, ODOT determined that an average of 710 vehicles per day traveled along the length of SR 319. This state highway is not included as a part of the National Highway System, a system of highways identified as being most important for the economy, mobility and defense of the nation.

== History ==
SR 319 was assigned in 1932. Originally, SR 319 included the entirety of the current route, along with the stretch of SR 118 from SR 319 north to SR 219 in Coldwater. In 1935, SR 319 was extended further north along the present alignment of SR 118 to what was then designated as SR 32, now a part of SR 29, west of Celina. Two years later, SR 118 was extended south from its former southern terminus in Rockford to its present southern terminus in Greenville. Consequently, the entirety of what was the north–south stretch of SR 319 prior to that time became a part of the new extension of SR 118. In turn, SR 319 became the short spur route that it is today.

== Major intersections ==
County	Location	mi	km	Destinations	Notes
Darke–Mercer county line	Burkettsville	0.00	0.00	Main Street / Washington Street	Western terminus
Darke–Mercer county line	Allen–Granville township line	0.56	0.90	SR 118 / Mercer Darke County Line Road – Coldwater, Greenville	Eastern terminus
1.000 mi = 1.609 km; 1.000 km = 0.621 mi
