= Lora Wildenthal =

American historian (born 1965)

Lora Wildenthal (born 1965) is an American historian and university professor.

== Life ==
Wildenthal studied German and history at Rice University in Houston, earning her bachelor's degree in 1987. After receiving her bachelor's, she completed a one-year fellowship at Albert-Ludwigs-Universität in Freiburg, Germany. She completed her Ph.D. in history at the University of Michigan in 1994. She later taught at Claremont Graduate University, the Massachusetts Institute of Technology, and Texas A&M University. Since 2003, she has worked at Rice University, where she holds the John Antony Weir Professorship in History and serves as director of the Center for the Study of Women, Gender and Sexuality.

She is married to fellow American historian and Rice professor Peter Carl Caldwell.

== Research ==
Wildenthal's early research focused on gender in German colonial history as well as human rights movements in postwar West Germany (1945–1990). Her current work examines the history of free wage labor in the early 19th century following the Prussian reforms.

In 2007, scholar Anette Dietrich described Wildenthal's book German Women for Empire, 1884–1945 (2001) as the most comprehensive study to date of the role of white German women in colonialism.

== Selected publications ==
- “Race, Gender, and Citizenship in the German Colonial Empire.” In: Tensions of Empire: Colonial Cultures in a Bourgeois World, edited by Frederick Cooper and Ann Laura Stoler. University of California Press, 1997.
- German Women for Empire, 1884–1945. Duke University Press, 2001.
- Germany’s Colonial Pasts, co-edited with Eric Ames and Marcia Klotz. 2005.
- Else Frobenius: Erinnerungen einer Journalistin: Zwischen Kaiserreich und Zweitem Weltkrieg, edited by Lora Wildenthal. Böhlau, 2005.
- The Language of Human Rights in West Germany. University of Pennsylvania Press, 2013.
- “Imagining Threatened Peoples: The Society for Threatened Peoples (Gesellschaft für bedrohte Völker) in 1970s West Germany.” In: Imagining Human Rights, pp. 101–117. Edited by Susanne Kaul and David Kim. Walter de Gruyter, 2015.
- The Routledge History of Human Rights, co-edited with Jean Quataert. Routledge, 2020.
