= Alessandra Moctezuma =

Mexican-American artist

Alessandra Moctezuma is a visual artist, educator and curator.

== Early life and education ==
Alessandra Moctezuma was born in Mexico City, Mexico in 1968. She immigrated to Los Angeles in 1981 with her parents and was raised by a father who focused on painting and a career in film alongside her mother, whose work focused on anthropology and archaeology. Her parents' influence led to her passion for the arts. At the age of 9, Alessandra’s family lived in Madrid, Spain before moving to Los Angeles, California in her teenage years.

Alessandra began her college education at Santa Monica College in Los Angeles, California. She then transferred to attended the University of California, Los Angeles and graduated with a Bachelors of Art in Fine Art and Chicano/a Studies, followed by a Masters in Fine Arts, and finally, her Ph.D. in Hispanic Language and Literature from Stony Brook University to pursue a Ph.D. in Hispanic Languages and Literature.

Early in her career, Alessandra started work in public art management and art education. Moctezuma worked as an assistant to Chicano public art muralist Judy Baca at the University of California, Los Angeles (UCLA). By the 1990’s, Alessandra was working as the LA County’s Metropolitan Transportation Authority’s public art officer, which later helped her become the Public Art Officer for the Los Angeles County Metropolitan Transportation Authority. She became Judy’s assistant where she not only helped her paint murals, but also understood what it takes to bring a mural to life. Her hard work as an assistant paid off as it later helped her manage large-scale public art projects for subway extensions and transit lines.

By 2020, Alessandra had dedicated 10 years working as a professor and gallery director with San Diego Mesa College. She primarily teaches Chicano/a art and Museum Studies and Gallery Exhibition Skills courses. She is a public art enthusiast and activist to create spaces for artists of color speaking on social justice issues and to shift focus to include San Diego community arts organizations.

== Works ==
Retrieved from the Smithsonian Institution, Fernanda Espinosa conducted an interview with Alessandra Moctezuma on July 22, 2020 that was transcribed to become part of the Archives of American Art’s Pandemic Oral History Project. In this interview, Alessandra admits she has never submitted her work for exhibits, she shares her artwork through social media postings.

Self-Portraits with Domestic Implements” (2020)

One piece of art made by Alessandra Moctezuma is “Self-Portraits with Domestic Implements” (2020), which are a series of self-portraits that include different household items and explore the themes of domesticity and identity. An exhibition by Moctezuma includes “Twenty Women Artists: NOW” (2021), which explored contemporary challenges that were faced by women. It featured works by twenty women artists and is located at the Oceanside Museum. Another one of Moctezuma’s exhibitions includes “Nature Improved: San Diego Artists Interpret Our Landscape” (2013–2014). This exhibition showcased regional artists’ interpretations of landscapes in San Diego by her and a curatorial team. Moctezuma also has art projects that she has worked on, including ADOBE LA, which aims to create a space that reflects the Latino communities.

=== Homage to Siqueiros Mural ===
In collaboration with Eva Cockcroft, Alessandra Moctezuma worked on a recreation of David Alfaro Siqueiros’s América Tropical by painting the mural Homage to Siqueiros. This mural was put on display at 3802 Cesar Chavez Avenue in East Los Angeles. The mural pays tribute to Siqueiros's original work from 1932, addressing historical and political themes. In the center features an individual crucified with the backdrop of an indigenous temple.

=== Siren Song ===
From April 26 to May 26, 2022, Alessandra’s artwork was displayed at the "Connecting the Dots: SDCCD Faculty and Staff Exhibition." Siren Song is a mixed media work done on a surfboard commemorating her sister, Joanna, and her perseverance. The piece displays an arrangement of marine life visuals.

=== Forests Mural ===
Alessandra and Celia Ko collaborated to create a 12 ft. 10 in. x 9 ft. 9.5 in. acrylic painted mural that displays a forest from a fisheye perspective. The mural was painted at 854 East 7th Street Long Beach, CA. It was completed in 1991 after being commissioned by the City of Long Beach Department of Community Development, Long Beach Parks, Recreation, & Marine.

== Personal life ==
Alessandra Moctezuma was married to the late American writer, Mike Davis (1946–2022).
