= Barbara Stoler Miller =

American Indologist (1940–1993)

- Born: August 8, 1940; New York City
- Died: April 19, 1993 (aged 52); New York City
- Education: Barnard College (BA); Columbia University (MA); University of Pennsylvania (PhD)
- Occupation: Indologist
- Relatives: Ann Laura Stoler (sister)

Barbara Stoler Miller (August 8, 1940 – April 19, 1993) was a scholar of Sanskrit literature. Her translation of the Bhagavad Gita was extremely successful and she helped popularize Indian literature in the U.S. She was the president of the Association for Asian Studies in 1990.

== Biography ==
Born in New York City on August 8, 1940, she attended Great Neck High School on Long Island in New York, graduating in 1958. She was one of three children. She went on to Barnard College and Columbia University, where she earned her B.A. in philosophy from 1959 to 1962 and her M.A. in Indic Studies from 1962 to 1964. During this period, she was elected to Phi Beta Kappa, was awarded the Montague Philosophy Prize, and was awarded her B.A. magna cum laude at Barnard in 1962. Miller proceeded to earn a Ph.D. in Indic Studies, with distinction, from the University of Pennsylvania in 1968. She was one of the last of the era of scholars trained by the W. Norman Brown and Stella Kramrisch, her two supervisors.

The department of Asian and Middle Eastern Cultures at Barnard College in New York City was the site of her floreat; she was made an assistant professor in 1968, and promoted to a full professor from 1977 before being made the departmental head in 1979. Following her promotion in 1979, Miller was awarded the Award in Higher Education by the National Council of Women. In 1983 she was made the Samuel R. Milbank Professor of Asian and Middle Eastern Cultures. As part of her research, Miller frequently traveled to India.

Miller edited and translated many works of Sanskrit poetry and drama. These included Bhartrihari: Poems (1967), Phantasies of a Love-Thief: The Caurapancasika Attributed to Bilhana (1971), Love Song of the Dark Lord: Jayadeva's Gitagovinda (1977), The Hermit and the Love-Thief: Sanskrit Poems of Bhartrihari and Bilhana (1978), Theatre of Memory: The Plays of Kalidasa (1984, with Edwin Gerow and David Gitomer) and The Bhagavad-Gita, Krishna's Counsel in Time of War (1986). All of these texts were published by Columbia University Press and the Bhagavad-Gita was also published by Bantam Books also. Her translation of the Bhagavad Gita, the most popular of the Hindu texts, was extremely successful, surpassing the popularity of many prior translations. Her work introduced a broad American audience who had not heard the Bhagavad Gita until they encountered the Bantam edition. She was known among the academic community in humanities and South Asian studies for her ability to present Indian poetry to the layperson in a manner that was aesthetically pleasing and academically rigorous. She popularized Indian literature without diluting the intellectual integrity. Miller’s enthusiasm for responsible popularization was demonstrated in the pride she took in her role as advisor to the director Peter Brooks in his production of the Mahabharata, which was mounted at the Brooklyn Academy of Music in 1978 and televised on the Public Broadcasting Service, an event that was seen as watershed in American popular awareness of Indian culture.

In addition to her major translations, Miller wrote a number of articles and edited several books, including Explaining India's Sacred Art: Selected Writings of Stella Kramrisch (1983), a work of dedicated to her former teacher; and Songs for the Bride: Wedding Rites of Rural India (1985), a book of essays by W. G. Archer, which she edited after his death. In 1989, she published another edited volume, The Powers of Art: Patronage in Indian Culture from 1000 B.C. to A.D. 1900, which was derived from a symposium that she planned and conducted at the National Humanities Center in October 1985, in conjunction with the Festival of India in the United States. In 1977, she published a book, Love Song of the Dark Lord, the English translation of the well-known Sanskrit epic poem, Gita Govinda. Miller’s work was not confined to Sanskrit; she published a translation of the Spanish poems of Agueda Pizarro de Rayo entitled Sombraventadora (Shadowinnower) in 1979.

Miller was an active and powerful presence in shaping the future direction of Barnard and Columbia. She served on the executive committee of the Southern Asian Institute at the School of International Affairs, was president of the Society of Fellows in the Humanities, and was the co-director of the Barnard Centennial Scholars Program, and was part of the editorial board of the Columbia University Press series of Translations from the Oriental Classics. She nurtured many students and fought strongly to ensure that their talents were rewarded and encouraged by grants and research posts. At a time when female scholars were still very much in the minority, Miller was trailblazer. She served on the P.E.N. Translation Committee, as Director-at-Large of the American Oriental Society, was on the board of directors of the American Council of Learned Societies and of the Taraknath Das Foundation, and she was president of the Association for Asian Studies in 1990. Miller was a Guggenheim Fellow and was given grants by the National Endowment for the Humanities, the Ford Foundation, the Smithsonian Institution, the American Council of Learned Societies, the American Institute of Indian Studies, and the Social Sciences Research Council.

During the final months of her life, she continued to work from her hospital bed, finishing her translation and analysis of the Yoga Sutras of Patanjali, which was published posthumously as Yoga: Discipline of Mind and Spirit.

She died in New York’s Columbia Presbyterian Medical Center of cancer on April 19, 1993 and was survived by her husband, Maxwell Greenwood, her daughter, Gwenn A. Miller, her mother, Sara Stoler, her sister, Ann Laura Stoler, and her brother William Stoler.

== Books ==
=== Translations ===
- Patañjali; Barbara Stoler Miller (transl.) (1996), Yoga: discipline of freedom: the Yoga Sutra attributed to Patanjali; a translation of the text, with commentary, introduction, and glossary of keywords, University of California Press, ISBN 978-0-520-20190-3
- Barbara Stoler Miller (transl.); Barry Moser (illus.) (1986), The Bhagavad-Gita: Krishna's counsel in time of war, Columbia University Press, ISBN 978-0-231-06468-2
- Barbara Stoler Miller, ed. (1984), Theater of memory: the plays of Kālidāsa, Columbia University Press, ISBN 978-0-231-05838-4
- Jayadeva; Barbara Stoler Miller (transl.) (1977), Love song of the dark lord: Jayadeva's Gītagovinda, Columbia University Press, ISBN 978-0-231-11097-6
- Barbara Stoler Miller (transl.) (1977), Gitagovinda of Jayadeva: Love Song of the Dark Lord, Motilal Banarsidass Publ., ISBN 978-81-208-0367-1
- Bilhaṇa; Barbara Stoler Miller (transl.) (1971), Phantasies of a love-thief: the Caurapañcāśikā attributed to Bilhaṇa, Columbia University Press, ISBN 978-0-231-03451-7
- Bhartṛhari; Barbara Stoler Miller (transl.) (1967), Bhartrihari: Poems, Columbia University Press, ISBN 978-0-231-02999-5

=== Other ===
- Barbara Stoler Miller (1993), Masterworks of Asian literature in comparative perspective: a guide for teaching, M.E. Sharpe, ISBN 978-1-56324-258-8
