= Lawrence A. Hirschfeld =

American anthropologist

- Born: Detroit, United States
- Occupations: Anthropologist, cognitive scientist, academic and author

Academic background
- Education: B.A., Anthropology; M.A., Anthropology; M Phil., Anthropology; PhD, Anthropology
- Alma mater: University of Michigan; Columbia University

Lawrence A. Hirschfeld is an American anthropologist, cognitive scientist, academic, and author. He is a professor in the Departments of Psychology and Anthropology at the New School for Social Research as well as a professor emeritus in the Departments of Psychology and Anthropology at the University of Michigan.

Hirschfeld is most known for his work on cognitive development, social reasoning and categorization, particularly the conceptual development of race and ethnicity. Among his authored works are publications in academic journals, including Cognition, Cognitive Psychology, Current Biology, and American Anthropologist as well as books such as Race in the Making: Culture and the Child's Construction of Human Kinds, Mapping the Mind: Domain Specificity in Cognition and Culture (co-edited with S. A. Gelman) and Biological and Cultural Bases of Human Inference (co-edited with R. Viale & D Andler).

== Education ==
Hirschfeld went to high school at The New Hampton School, in New Hampshire. He completed his B.A. in Anthropology from the University of Michigan in 1971. He then obtained an M.A. in Anthropology and an M. Phil., both from Columbia University in 1975. Later, he earned his PhD in Anthropology from the same institution in 1984.

== Career ==
Hirschfeld's first academic post was at the Collège de France, where he served as an associate member of the Social Anthropology Laboratory from 1979 to 1983 under the direction of Claude Lévi-Strauss. Following this, he was appointed assistant scientist at the University of Wisconsin from 1983 to 1989. Concurrently, he was a research associate in the Department of Psychology from 1984 to 1985. In 1989, he joined the University of Michigan as an assistant professor in the Department of Anthropology and the School of Social Work, a position he held until 1996. During this period, he was also a faculty associate at the Institute for Social Research from 1992 to 2005. In 1996, he was appointed associate professor in the Departments of Psychology and Anthropology, and in 2004, he became a professor in both departments. Since 2005, he has been a professor in the Departments of Psychology and Anthropology at the New School for Social Research. He also holds the title of professor emeritus in the Departments of Psychology and Anthropology at the University of Michigan. Hirschfeld has held visiting appointments at the Center for Advanced Study in the Behavioral Sciences, Stanford University, Le Laboratoire de Psychobiologie de l’Enfant, Centre de Recherche en Epistémologie Appliquée.

== Media coverage ==
Hirschfeld's work has been covered in notable media including the New York Times, National Public Radio, PBS, the Washington Post, the Detroit News, the Detroit Free Press and the Los Angeles Times.

== Publications ==
Hirschfeld has contributed to books throughout his career. In 1994, he co-edited Mapping the Mind: Domain Specificity in Cognition and Culture. The book explored the claim that human cognition consists of specialized, domain-specific abilities rather than a general problem-solving mechanism, compiling essays from various disciplines to support this perspectives. His 1996 book Race in the Making: Cognition, Culture and the Child's Construction of Human Kinds argued that racial thinking arose from a specialized cognitive ability for understanding human kinds, challenging the view that race was purely a social construct. Moreover, in 2006, he co-edited Biological and Cultural Bases of Human Inference which explored the interplay between innate cognitive abilities and cultural influences, addressing the debate between nativists and cultural relativists through a multidisciplinary lens encompassing evolutionary theory, cognitive development, and social science perspectives.

== Research ==
Hirschfeld, in his early research, critiqued both formal semantic and symbolic approaches to kinship terms, proposing that their meaning was best understood through the speaker's belief in a systematic, natural resemblance between the individuals linked by relationship terms. His 1988 study examined how young children developed mental representations of racial and ethnic categories, arguing in counterpoint to social constructivists that the acquisition of racial and ethnic concepts is markedly consistent across cultures despite significant cross-cultural variations in social classifications. In a widely cited 1995 paper, he empirically explored young children's sophisticated, domain-specific reasoning about racial variation, challenging the view that the acquisition of racial concepts relied principally on superficial appearance. The study presented five experiments revealing children's theory-like understanding of social categories, with implications for theorizing cross-domain knowledge transfer. In the same year, he investigated children's expectations about the inheritability of racial features and racial categories, revealing that by preadolescence, children typically expect mixed-race children to categorically share the identity of the minority parent (consistent with the one-drop rule) but also to have unambiguously Black physical features (despite little evidence that they are taught this). Strikingly, there is individual variation in these expectations, as this is shaped by the communities the children live in rather than by their race.

In a set of widely cited studies published in 1997, Hirschfeld and Gelman investigated preschoolers' understanding of the relationship between language, social group membership, and various aspects of the social environment, finding that children attributed language differences to certain social categories and clothing and architectural styles. The findings also suggested children coordinated knowledge across domains and explored the underlying mechanisms driving these associations. In a 1999 essay examining the concept of essence in a range of empirical domains besides folkbiology, he, along with Gelman, challenged the widely-held claim that essentialist representations are rooted in folkbiology. His 2004 collaboration with Dan Sperber explored how human-specific cognitive abilities, both general and domain-specific, contribute to the emergence and evolution of diverse cultures, integrating perspectives from developmental psychology, evolutionary psychology, and cognitive anthropology. With Frith, White, and Bartmess, in a 2007 study, he provided the first persuasive evidence that social reasoning about group affiliation is independent of Theory of Mind, one that provides a distinct modality of reasoning about behavior governed by a special-purpose cognitive device for folk sociology. Through his 2013 work, he argued that social group affiliation and social roles shape human behavior, emphasizing that actions are influenced more by these aspects of the social environment than individual intentions. The essay also critiqued the over-estimation of mentalizing as a modality for interpreting and predicting behavior, suggesting that these judgments are often independent of attributions to internal states.

Hirschfeld's lab conducted work showing that preverbal infants' expectations about social affiliation are consistent with (and precursor to) later emerging patterns of folk sociological reasoning. In contrast, infants in a control condition (in which the group members perform the same movements while crossing the screen but in the absence of a third party) did not differ in how long they looked at the subsequent cohering and dispersing events.

== Personal life ==
Hirschfeld lives in New York City with his wife, Ann Laura Stoler, who is the Willy Brandt Distinguished University Professor of Anthropology and Historical Studies at The New School for Social Research in New York City.

== Bibliography ==
=== Books ===
- Mapping the mind: Domain Specificity in Cognition and Culture (1994) ISBN 9780521429931
- Race in the Making: Cognition, Culture and the Child's Construction of Human Kinds (1998) ISBN 9780262581721
- Biological and Cultural Bases of Human Inference (2016) ISBN 9781138004177

=== Selected articles ===
- Hirschfeld, L. A. (1993). Discovering social difference-the role of appearance in the development of racial awareness. Cognitive Psychology, 25(3), 317–350.
- Hirschfeld, L. A. (1995). Do children have a theory of race? Cognition, 54(2), 209–252.
- Hirschfeld, L. A. (2002). Why don't anthropologists like children?. American anthropologist, 104(2), 611–627.
- Sperber, D., & Hirschfeld, L. A. (2004). The cognitive foundations of cultural stability and diversity. Trends in cognitive sciences, 8(1), 40–46.
- Hirschfeld, L., Bartmess, E., White, S., & Frith, U. (2007). Can autistic children predict behavior by social stereotypes?. Current biology, 17(12), R451-R452.
- Sheikh, H., & Hirschfeld, L. A. (2019). Collections, collectives, and individuals: Preschoolers’ attributions of intentionality. Cognition, 190, 99–104.
