= Citizenship between Empire and Nation: Remaking France and French Africa, 1945–1960 =

2014 non-fiction books

Citizenship between Empire and Nation: Remaking France and French Africa
- Book cover
- Author: Frederick Cooper (historian)
- Language: English
- Subject: History of Algeria, French colonial empire
- Genre: Non-fiction, history
- Publisher: Princeton University Press
- Publication date: 2014
- Pages: 512
- ISBN: 978-0691161310
- Website: Princeton University Press

Citizenship between Empire and Nation: Remaking France and French Africa is a book by Frederick Cooper published in 2014 by Princeton University Press. The work is about citizenship, colonialism, and identity in France and French North Africa from 1946 to 1960.

== Structure ==
The work contains normal front material and a preface by the author followed by eight main chapters:

1. From French Empire to French Union
2. A Constitution for an Empire of Citizens
3. Defining Citizenship, 1946–1956
4. Claiming Citizenship: French West Africa, 1946–1956
5. Reframing France: The Loi- Cadre and African Federalism, 1956–1957
6. From Overseas Territory to Member State: Constitution and Conflict, 1958
7. Unity and Division in Africa and France, 1958–1959
8. Becoming National

The work ends with a conclusion and a bibliography.

== Academic journal reviews ==
- Pearson-Patel, Jessica (2015). "Reviewed work: Interlopers of Empire: The Lebanese Diaspora in Colonial French West Africa, Andrew Arsan". The International Journal of African Historical Studies. 48 (1): 135–136. JSTOR 44715397.
- Ginio, Ruth (2015). "Reviewed work: Africa in the World: Capitalism, Empire, Nation-State, Frederick Cooper; Citizenship between Empire and Nation: Remaking France and French Africa, 1945-1960, Frederick Cooper". The American Historical Review. 120 (5): 1844–1847. doi:10.1093/ahr/120.5.1844. JSTOR 43697084.
- Cole, Joshua (2019). "Reviewed work: Citizenship between Empire and Nation: Remaking France and French Africa, 1945–1960, Frederick Cooper". French Politics, Culture & Society. 37 (3): 148–151. JSTOR 26893031.
- Oloyede, Olajide (2014). "Agony in Nation-State Building/ Agonie dans construction de la nation". African Sociological Review / Revue Africaine de Sociologie. 18 (1): 149–153. JSTOR afrisocirevi.18.1.149.
- Keese, Alexander (2015). "Reviewed work: Citizenship between Empire and Nation: Remaking France and French Africa, 1945—1960, Frederick Cooper". The Journal of Interdisciplinary History. 46 (2): 285–287. doi:10.1162/JINH_r_00848. JSTOR 43829766. S2CID 143240867.
- Warson, Joanna (2015). "Reviewed work: Citizenship between Empire and Nation: Remaking France and French Africa, 1945–1960, FREDERICK COOPER". Africa: Journal of the International African Institute. 85 (3): 554–555. doi:10.1017/S0001972015000418. JSTOR 24525702. S2CID 141551866.
- Goerg, Odile (2015). "Reviewed work: Citizenship between Empire and Nation: Remaking France and French Africa, 1945-1960, Français et Africains ? Être citoyen au temps de décolonisation, « Histoire Payot », Frederick Cooper, Christian Jeanmougin". Revue Historique. 1 (673): 235–238. JSTOR 43885030.
- Schmidt, Elizabeth (2016). "The Accidental Nation-State". The Journal of African History. 57 (1): 140–141. doi:10.1017/S0021853715000572. JSTOR 44509250. S2CID 164857011.

== Awards ==
- 2015: George Louis Beer Prize, American Historical Association.
- 2015: Martin A. Klein Prize, American Historical Association.

== Publication history ==
- Cooper, Frederick (2014), Citizenship between Empire and Nation: Remaking France and French Africa, 1945–1960 (Hardback ed.), Princeton University Press

== About the author ==
Frederick Cooper is historian and Professor Emeritus of history at New York University; their scholarship and writing focuses on Modern African history and colonialism. Their other works include Colonialism in Question (2005) and coauthor of Empires in World History (2011).

== Similar or related works ==
- A History of Algeria by James McDougall
- A Savage War of Peace: Algeria, 1954-1962 by Alistair Horne
- History and the culture of nationalism in Algeria by James McDougall

== See also ==
- History of Algeria
- French colonial empire
