= Ecology of Fear =

Book by Mike Davis

Ecology of Fear: Los Angeles and the Imagination of Disaster
- First edition
- Author: Mike Davis
- Language: English
- Subject: History
- Genre: Non-fiction
- Publisher: Metropolitan Books
- Publication date: 1998
- Publication place: United States
- ISBN: 978-0375706073

Ecology of Fear: Los Angeles and the Imagination of Disaster is a 1998 book by historian and urban theorist Mike Davis examining how contemporary Los Angeles is portrayed in the popular media. The book investigates the relationship between natural disasters and social injustices in Southern California. The author explores the history of urbanization in the area and how it has disregarded environmental common sense. The book also examines the intersection between social issues and the perception of natural disorder.

== Content ==
The book is divided into seven chapters and they are as follows:

The Dialectic of Ordinary Disaster

This chapter explores the frequent natural disasters in Los Angeles and the "disaster fatigue" they create.

How Eden Lost Its Garden

This chapter explores the history of the Los Angeles area and the forces that have encroached on its natural beauty.

The Case for Letting Malibu Burn

This chapter juxtaposes the fire risk between Malibu and downtown Los Angeles, and explores the history of fires in Malibu.

Our Secret Kansas

This chapter explores the risk of tornadoes in Los Angeles.

Maneaters of the Sierra Madre

This chapter explores the growing number of interactions between humans and wild animals in Los Angeles.

The Literary Destruction of Los Angeles

This chapter explores the theme of the destruction of Los Angeles in literature.

Beyond Blade Runner

This chapter explores the dystopian future of Los Angeles.
