= City of Quartz =

1990 nonfiction book by Mike Davis

City of Quartz: Excavating the Future in Los Angeles
- First edition
- Author: Mike Davis
- Language: English
- Series: Haymarket
- Subject: History
- Genre: Non-fiction
- Publisher: Verso Books
- Publication date: October 17, 1990
- Publication place: United States
- Media type: Print
- Pages: 472 pp
- ISBN: 978-0860913030
- OCLC: 22118422

City of Quartz: Excavating the Future in Los Angeles is a 1990 book by American author Mike Davis proposing a theory that contemporary Los Angeles has been shaped by different powerful forces in its history.

== Summary ==
The book opens with Davis visiting the ruins of the socialist community of Llano, organized in 1914 in what is now the Antelope Valley north of Los Angeles. After power struggles between commune members and difficulty securing water, the community moved in 1918, leaving behind what Davis perceives as a "ghost" of an alternative future for LA.

Davis then explores intellectuals' competing ideas of Los Angeles, from the "sunshine" promoted by real estate boosters early in the 20th century, to the "debunkers," the muckraking journalists of the early century, to the "noir" writers of the 1930s and the exiles fleeing from fascism in Europe, and finally the "sorcerers," the scientists at Caltech.

The rest of the book explores how different groups wielded power in different ways: the downtown Protestant elite, led by the Chandler family of the Los Angeles Times; the new elite of the Jewish Westside; the surprisingly powerful homeowner groups; the Los Angeles Police Department. He covers the Irish leadership of the Catholic Church and its friction with the numerically dominant Latino element. The book concludes at what Davis calls the "junkyard of dreams," the former steel town of Fontana, east of LA, a victim of de-industrialization and decay.

The second edition of the book, published in 2006, contains a new preface detailing changes in Los Angeles since City of Quartz was first published.

== Critical reception ==
The Los Angeles Times architecture critic, Christopher Hawthorne, criticized City of Quartz for its "dark generalization and knee-jerk far-leftism," but concluded that the book "is without question the most significant book on Los Angeles urbanism to appear since Reyner Banham's Los Angeles: The Architecture of Four Ecologies was published in 1971." He ranked it "one of the three most important treatments of that subject ever written, joining Four Ecologies and Carey McWilliams' 1946 book Southern California: An Island on the Land."

In the Boston Review, Mark Haefele called the book "a black hole of Southland noir," but also wrote, "What's brilliant about Davis's book is his perception of Los Angeles as incarceration, its new prisons a major industry... He's right that a broad landscape of the city is turning itself into Postmodern Piranesi. And to young black males in particular, the city has become a prisoner factory."

The San Francisco Examiner concluded that "Few books shed as much light on their subjects as this opinionated and original excavation of Los Angeles from the mythical debris of its past and future", and Peter Ackroyd, writing in The Times of London, called the book "A history as fascinating as it is instructive."

== Reviews ==
- Blanchard, Marc. Cultural Anthropology, Vol. 7, No. 4 (November, 1992).
- Bray, Chris. Suck.com, Wall of Voodoo (December 15, 1998).
- Decker, Jeffrey Louis. American Quarterly, Vol. 44, No. 1 (March, 1992).
- Erie. Steven P. Political Science Quarterly, Vol. 107., No. 1 (Spring, 1992).
- Ford, Richard T. Transition, No. 57 (1992).
- Horton, John. Contemporary Sociology, Vol. 20, No. 6 (November, 1991).
- Kirkham, Pat. Journal of Design History, Vol. 5., No. 2 (1992).
- Knox, Paul. Annals of the Association of American Geographers, Vol. 83, No. 1 (March 1993).
- Williams, Rosalind. Journal of American History, Vol. 79, No. 4 (March, 1993).

== See also ==
- Set the Night on Fire
