= Jane Burbank =

American historian (born 1946)

Jane Richardson Burbank (born 11 June 1946 in Hartford, Connecticut, United States) is an American historian who is emeritus professor of history at New York University. She is known for her scholarship on Russia and its empire, as well as global history more broadly.

She was awarded the 2023 Toynbee Prize for her contributions to global history. Her 2010 book Empires in World History: Power and the Politics of Difference (co-authored with Frederick Cooper) won the 2011 World History Association Book Prize. The 2023 Toynbee Prize announcement described the book as "a landmark work of global history that combines extraordinary breadth with sophisticated analysis. They argue that for centuries empires, rather than nation-states, were the dominant political units in the global order."

In 1981, she received a PhD from Harvard University. She is former director of the Center for Russian and East European Studies at the University of Michigan.

== Links ==
- https://www.youtube.com/watch?v=Njfu197Ev34
