= Kiran Klaus Patel =

German historian (born 1971)

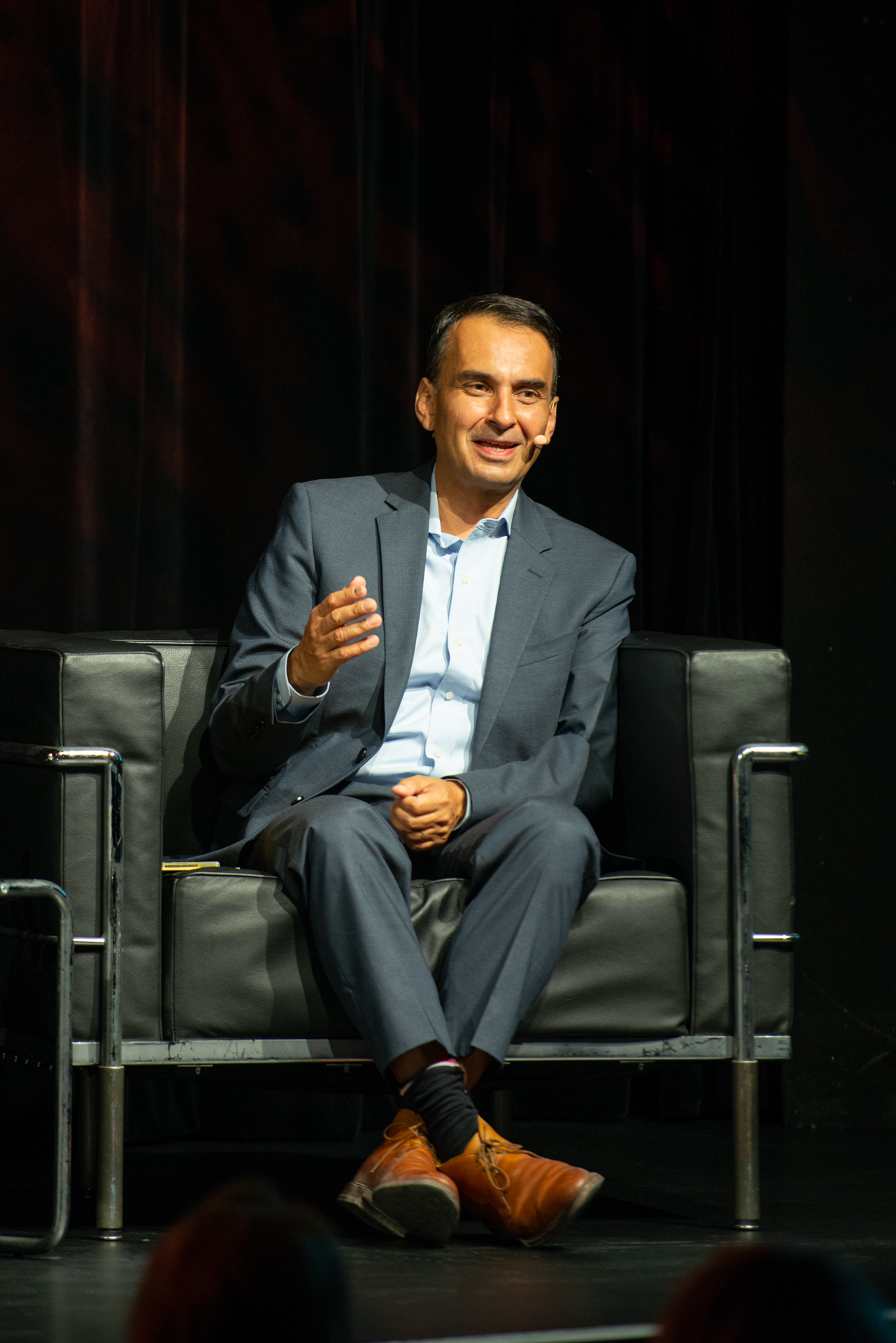
Copyright: NZZ/ Wegmann (2020)

Kiran Klaus Patel (born 3 October 1971) is a German historian. He holds a Chair at the Ludwig-Maximilians-Universität München. He is a fellow of the Royal Historical Society.

== Education and career ==
Patel studied history at the University of Freiburg and at Humboldt University of Berlin.

Since 2019, he has been teaching in Munich. He holds the Chair of Modern History at Ludwig-Maximilians-Universität München. He is also founding director of Project House Europe at LMU Munich, which promotes interdisciplinary research on the history of Europe. From 2011 to 2019 he held the Chair of European and Global History at Maastricht University following a professorship at the European University Institute in Florence from 2007 to 2011 (Joint Chair; Department of History and Civilisation & Robert Schuman Centre for Advanced Studies). He was visiting professor at the London School of Economics and at Sciences Po Paris. As John F. Kennedy Fellow he spent a year at Harvard University. Furthermore, he was awarded fellowships at the University of Oxford and the University of Freiburg (among others). His book, The New Deal: A Global History (Princeton University Press), which situates the role of the US during the 1930s and 1940s in a comparative and transnational context. The American Historical Review praised it, arguing that "Patel's story will become the definitive account“ and the monograph won the WHA Bentley Book Prize, awarded by the World History Association. Patel's Project Europe: A History (Cambridge University Press 2020; first published in German in 2018) challenged the narrative that the European Union was a successful force for peace from its inception. Project Europe has attracted a lot of media attention in Germany and internationally.

Patel is an elected member of the Royal Netherlands Academy of the Arts and Science, the Academy of Science and Literature, Mainz and the Historical Commission at the Bavarian Academy of Sciences and Humanities.

== Selected professional functions ==
- Willy Brandt Foundation, Member of the International Advisory Board
- Institut für Zeitgeschichte, Munich, Chair of the Advisory Board
- Contemporary European History, Member of the Editorial Board
- Geschichte und Gesellschaft, Member of the Editorial Board
- Monde(s). Histoire - Espaces - Relations, Member of the Editorial Board

== Selected publications ==
- Soldiers of Labor: Labor Service in Nazi Germany and New Deal America, 1933-1945 (New York: Cambridge University Press, 2005).
- Fertile ground for Europe? The history of European Integration and the Common Agricultural Policy since 1945 (Baden Baden: Nomos, 2009).
- The United States and Germany during the Twentieth Century: Competition and Convergence (with Christof Mauch) (New York: Cambridge University Press, 2010)
- The Cultural Politics of Europe: European Capitals of Culture and European Union since the 1980s (London: Routledge, 2013).
- European Integration and the Atlantic Community in the 1980s (New York: Cambridge University Press, 2013).
- Historical Foundations of EU Competition Law (with Heike Schweitzer) (Oxford: Oxford University Press, 2014).
- The New Deal: A Global History (Princeton: Princeton University Press, 2017).
- Project Europe: A History (Cambridge: Cambridge University Press, 2020). First published as Projekt Europa: Eine kritische Geschichte (Munich: Beck, 2018).
