= Anna Davin =

British academic and community historian

Anna Davin (born 1940) is a British academic and community historian; she is noted for her studies of working-class communities and her contributions to feminist politics and history-writing. She was a research fellow at Middlesex University.

== Life ==
Davin was born in 1940, the daughter of Dan and Winne Davin, who both worked for Oxford University Press. In 1958, she got married and subsequently raised children, but she returned to education, studying history at the University of Warwick from 1966 to 1969, and was a founding member of the Women's Liberation Group there (1968). The experience of raising children and returning to education meant the she "was thinking class and gender very strongly". In 1970, she began studying for a PhD at Birkbeck College, London. While in London, she joined the Stratford Women's Liberation Group (helping to produce its publication, Shrew) and a feminist history group based in Pimlico. She also became involved in the 1970s in the History Workshop Movement; she was a founder editor of the History Workshop Journal (founded in 1976). Between 1972 and 1974, she was involved in the People's Autobiography of Hackney, an oral history project organised with the Hackney Workers' Educational Association.

In 1979, she started teaching six-week classes in history at Binghamton University, but otherwise taught evening classes in London during the 1980s. She returned to her PhD studies in the early 1990s; the doctorate was awarded in 1991 for her thesis "Work and school for the children of London's labouring poor in the late nineteenth century and early twentieth century". In the 1990s, Davin became a research fellow at Middlesex University and published a book, Growing Up Poor (1996).

== Selected publications ==
- "Imperialism and motherhood", History Workshop Journal, no. 5 (1978), pp. 9–65.
- Growing Up Poor: Home, School and Street in London 1870-1914 (London: Rivers Oram Press, 1996).
