= Adam McKeown =

American historian (born 1965)

Adam M. McKeown (1965–2017) was a historian of transnational migration.

== Biography ==
Born in San Francisco, McKeown earned his PhD in history at the University of Chicago in 1997. His dissertation, later published as Chinese Migrant Networks and Cultural Change, studied Chinese migrants in Chicago, Peru, and Hawaii, and highlighted the transnational networks developed by migrant flow. In his view, the relevant points of reference were not “China” or “the United States", for instance, but particular villages and district, “nodes” of transit in Hong Kong, San Francisco, and Singapore, and the sophisticated "credit system”. In his important 2004 article "Global Migration, 1846–1940," McKeown showed Asian migration was comparable to its contemporary transatlantic migration. His later monograph Melancholy Order looked at border control as historically resulting from the attempt to control Asian migration in the 1880s.

McKeown taught at Northeastern University, followed by Columbia University, where he became a full professor. In 2013, McKeown gave up his tenured position due to his frustration with academic politics.

McKeown had an accidental death on September 10, 2017.

== Works ==
- McKeown, Adam (2001). Chinese Migrant Networks and Cultural Change: Peru, Chicago, and Hawaii 1900-1936. Chicago: University of Chicago Press. ISBN 978-0-226-56024-3.
- McKeown, Adam (2011). Melancholy Order: Asian Migration and the Globalization of Borders. New York: Columbia University Press. ISBN 978-0-231-14077-5.
