= Burkettsville, Ohio =

- Village
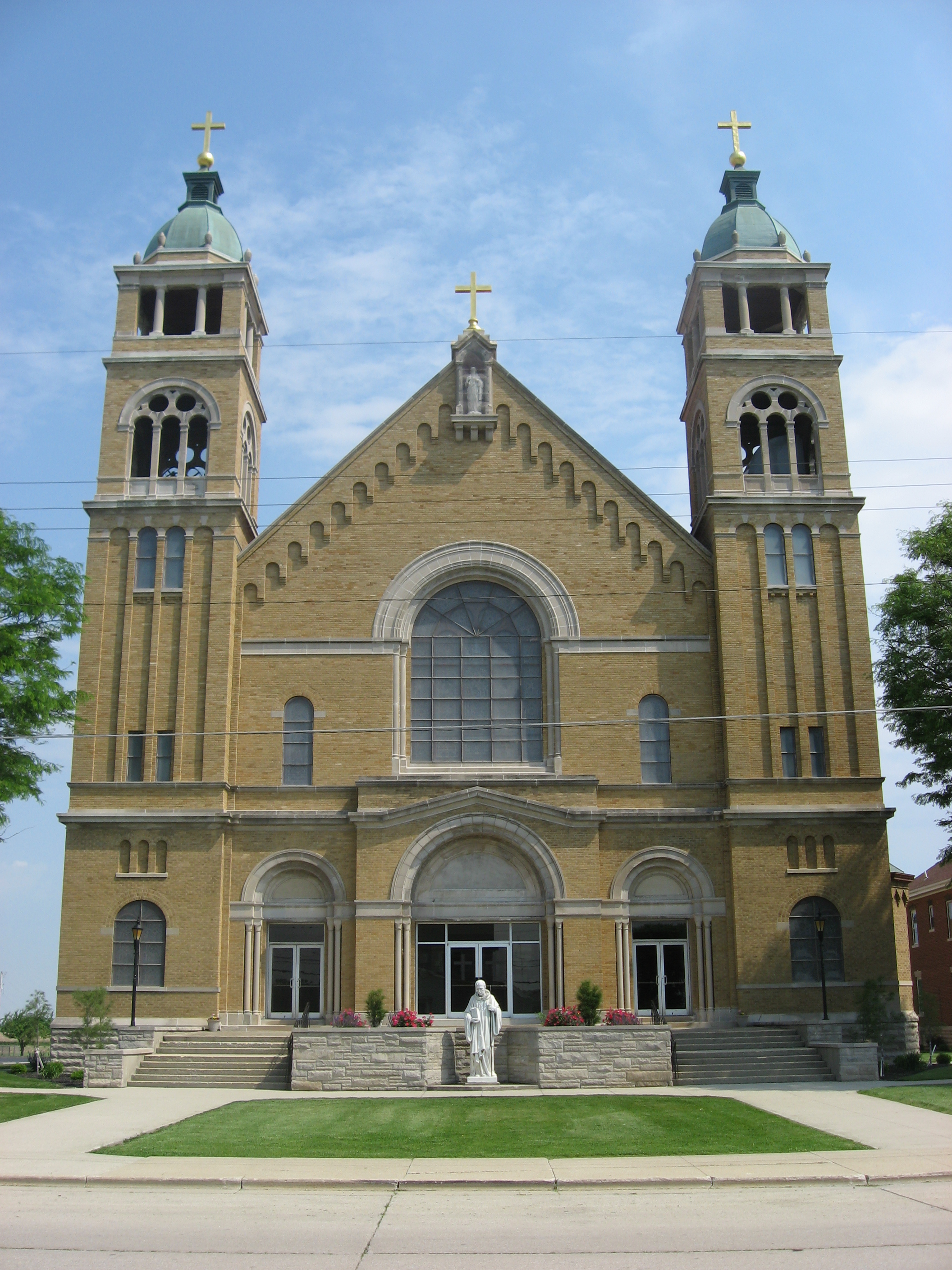
- St. Bernard's Catholic Church on the Mercer County side of Main Street

- Location in Mercer County and the state of Ohio.
- Coordinates: 40°21′11″N 84°38′33″W
- Country: United States
- State: Ohio
- Counties: Mercer, Darke

Area
  - Total: 0.17 sq mi (0.45 km^{2})
  - Land: 0.17 sq mi (0.45 km^{2})
  - Water: 0 sq mi (0.00 km^{2})
- Elevation: 974 ft (297 m)

Population (2020)
  - Total: 272
  - Estimate (2023): 265
  - Density: 1,568/sq mi (605.5/km^{2})
- Time zone: UTC-5 (Eastern (EST))
  - Summer (DST): UTC-4 (EDT)
- ZIP code: 45310
- Area code: 419
- FIPS code: 39-10296
- GNIS feature ID: 2397499

Burkettsville /ˈbɜːrkɛtsvɪl/ is a village in Darke and Mercer counties in the U.S. state of Ohio. The population was 272 at the 2020 census.

== History ==
Burkettsville had its start when the railroad was extended to that point. The town site was platted in 1876. A post office was established at Burkettsville in 1881, and was still in operation in 2026.

== Geography ==
According to the United States Census Bureau, the village has a total area of 0.18 square miles (0.47 km^{2}), all land.

== Demographics ==
Historical population
Census	Pop.	Note	%±
1910	236		—
1920	218		−7.6%
1930	155		−28.9%
1940	220		41.9%
1950	211		−4.1%
1960	290		37.4%
1970	279		−3.8%
1980	295		5.7%
1990	268		−9.2%
2000	254		−5.2%
2010	244		−3.9%
2020	272		11.5%
2023 (est.)	265	▼	−2.6%
U.S. Decennial Census

=== 2010 census ===
As of the census of 2010, there were 244 people, 96 households, and 76 families living in the village. The population density was 1,355.6 inhabitants per square mile (523.4/km^{2}). There were 104 housing units at an average density of 577.8 per square mile (223.1/km^{2}). The racial makeup of the village was 99.2% White and 0.8% African American. Hispanic or Latino of any race were 0.8% of the population.

There were 96 households, of which 30.2% had children under the age of 18 living with them, 68.8% were married couples living together, 5.2% had a female householder with no husband present, 5.2% had a male householder with no wife present, and 20.8% were non-families. 18.8% of all households were made up of individuals, and 9.4% had someone living alone who was 65 years of age or older. The average household size was 2.54 and the average family size was 2.88.

The median age in the village was 35.7 years. 24.6% of residents were under the age of 18; 6.5% were between the ages of 18 and 24; 27.5% were from 25 to 44; 24.6% were from 45 to 64; and 16.8% were 65 years of age or older. The gender makeup of the village was 52.9% male and 47.1% female.

=== 2000 census ===
As of the census of 2000, there were 254 people, 94 households, and 72 families living in the village. The population density was 1,531.5 inhabitants per square mile (591.3/km^{2}). There were 99 housing units at an average density of 596.9 per square mile (230.5/km^{2}). The racial makeup of the village was 98.82% White, 0.39% Native American, and 0.79% from two or more races.

There were 94 households, out of which 34.0% had children under the age of 18 living with them, 67.0% were married couples living together, 8.5% had a female householder with no husband present, and 23.4% were non-families. 22.3% of all households were made up of individuals, and 9.6% had someone living alone who was 65 years of age or older. The average household size was 2.70 and the average family size was 3.19.

In the village, the population was spread out, with 21.3% under the age of 18, 15.7% from 18 to 24, 27.6% from 25 to 44, 19.3% from 45 to 64, and 16.1% who were 65 years of age or older. The median age was 32 years. For every 100 females there were 106.5 males. For every 100 females age 18 and over, there were 106.2 males.

The median income for a household in the village was $45,833, and the median income for a family was $51,250. Males had a median income of $31,827 versus $19,688 for females. The per capita income for the village was $17,244. None of the families and 0.8% of the population were living below the poverty line, including no under eighteens and 4.3% of those over 64.
