= Venedocia, Ohio =

- Village
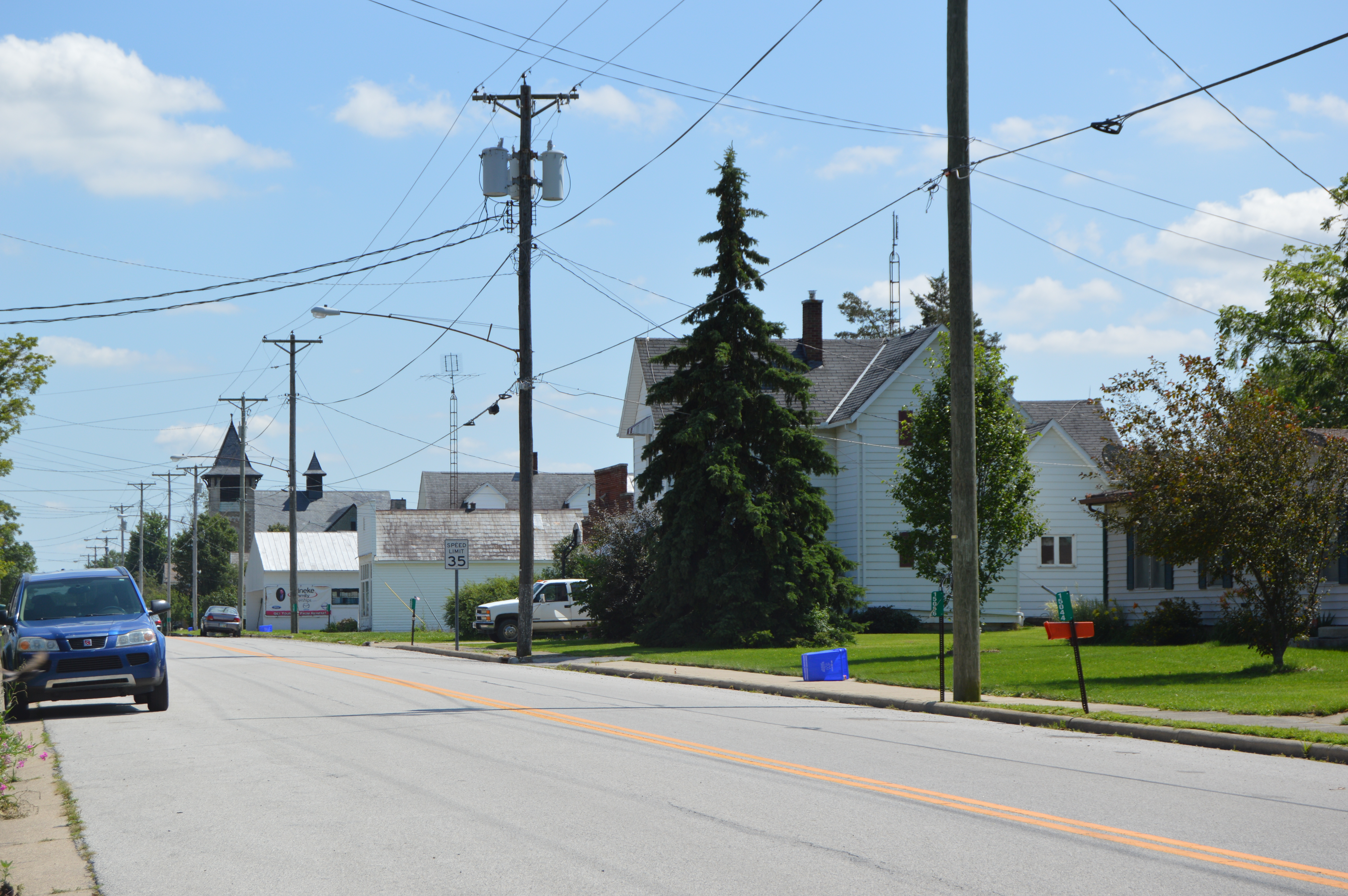
- Main Street scene

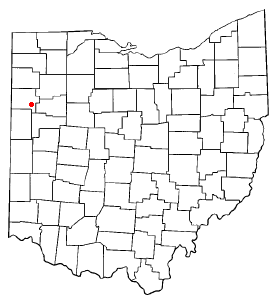
- Location of Venedocia, Ohio

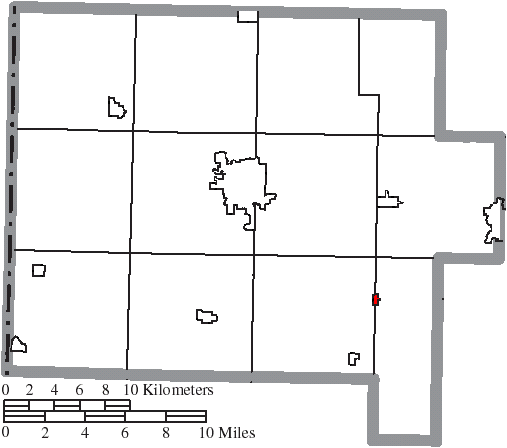
- Location of Venedocia in Van Wert County
- Coordinates: 40°47′06″N 84°27′21″W
- Country: United States
- State: Ohio
- County: Van Wert
- Township: Jennings, York

Government
  - Mayor: Sarah Kimmet

Area
  - Total: 0.14 sq mi (0.36 km^{2})
  - Land: 0.14 sq mi (0.36 km^{2})
  - Water: 0 sq mi (0.00 km^{2})
- Elevation: 807 ft (246 m)

Population (2020)
  - Total: 140
  - Density: 1,011.5/sq mi (390.56/km^{2})
- Time zone: UTC-5 (Eastern (EST))
  - Summer (DST): UTC-4 (EDT)
- ZIP code: 45894
- Area code: 419
- FIPS code: 39-79632
- GNIS feature ID: 2400052
- Website: http://www.venedocia.org/

Venedocia is a village in Van Wert County, Ohio, United States. The population was 140 at the 2020 census. It is included within the Van Wert, Ohio Micropolitan Statistical Area and the Lima-Van Wert-Wapakoneta, OH Combined Statistical Area.

== History ==
A post office called Venedocia has been in operation since 1866. The village was originally built up chiefly by Welsh settlers.

== Geography ==
According to the United States Census Bureau, the village has a total area of 0.13 square miles (0.34 km^{2}), all land.

== Demographics ==
Historical population
Census	Pop.	Note	%±
1900	199		—
1910	247		24.1%
1920	180		−27.1%
1930	164		−8.9%
1940	174		6.1%
1950	170		−2.3%
1960	200		17.6%
1970	202		1.0%
1980	161		−20.3%
1990	158		−1.9%
2000	160		1.3%
2010	124		−22.5%
2020	140		12.9%
U.S. Decennial Census

=== 2010 census ===
As of the census of 2010, there were 124 people, 53 households, and 30 families living in the village. The population density was 953.8 inhabitants per square mile (368.3/km^{2}). There were 58 housing units at an average density of 446.2 per square mile (172.3/km^{2}). The racial makeup of the village was 97.6% White, 0.8% African American, and 1.6% from two or more races.

There were 53 households, of which 24.5% had children under the age of 18 living with them, 47.2% were married couples living together, 7.5% had a female householder with no husband present, 1.9% had a male householder with no wife present, and 43.4% were non-families. 39.6% of all households were made up of individuals, and 15.1% had someone living alone who was 65 years of age or older. The average household size was 2.34 and the average family size was 3.10.

The median age in the village was 42 years. 20.2% of residents were under the age of 18; 7.9% were between the ages of 18 and 24; 24.2% were from 25 to 44; 33% were from 45 to 64; and 14.5% were 65 years of age or older. The gender makeup of the village was 54.0% male and 46.0% female.

=== 2000 census ===
As of the census of 2000, there were 160 people, 59 households, and 43 families living in the village. The population density was 1,196.7 inhabitants per square mile (462.0/km^{2}). There were 63 housing units at an average density of 471.2 per square mile (181.9/km^{2}). The racial makeup of the village was 98.12% White, and 1.88% from two or more races. Hispanic or Latino of any race were 0.62% of the population.

There were 59 households, out of which 40.7% had children under the age of 18 living with them, 57.6% were married couples living together, 13.6% had a female householder with no husband present, and 27.1% were non-families. 23.7% of all households were made up of individuals, and 13.6% had someone living alone who was 65 years of age or older. The average household size was 2.71 and the average family size was 3.12.

In the village, the population was spread out, with 27.5% under the age of 18, 8.1% from 18 to 24, 28.8% from 25 to 44, 17.5% from 45 to 64, and 18.1% who were 65 years of age or older. The median age was 40 years. For every 100 females there were 77.8 males. For every 100 females age 18 and over, there were 78.5 males.

The median income for a household in the village was $31,250, and the median income for a family was $41,250. Males had a median income of $26,667 versus $20,000 for females. The per capita income for the village was $11,761. About 10.0% of families and 13.0% of the population were below the poverty line, including 6.5% of those under the age of eighteen and 23.1% of those 65 or over.
