= Frederick Cooper (historian) =

American historian

Frederick Cooper (born October 27, 1947, in New York City) is an American historian who specializes in colonialization, decolonialization, and African history. He is Professor Emeritus of History at New York University.

== Career ==
In 1969, Cooper received a BA from Stanford University. In 1974, Cooper received his PhD in history from Yale University where he specialized in African history. His PhD dissertation, "Plantation Slavery on the East Coast of Africa in the Nineteenth Century," was published with Yale University Press in 1977. Prior to NYU, Cooper taught at Harvard University from 1974 to 1982 and the University of Michigan from 1982 to 2002.

== Academic contributions ==
Cooper initially studied the history of labor and of labor movements in East Africa, but later moved on to broaden his scope to embrace francophone West Africa as well. Though a firm base in social and polit-economical history is a constant of his works, one characteristic of Cooper's approach to history is a strong concern with epistemological questions and the possibilities and limits of knowledge production, as can best be seen in his articles on globalization and identity, reprinted in his book Colonialism in Question in 2005.

Cooper's research on federalist and confederated proposals to structure relations between the French metropole and its African colonies influenced a new scholarly literature on federalism.

Cooper's contributions to the history of colonialism in Africa and to contemporary African history have been crucial in the fields of African studies and beyond. One of his best known conceptual contributions is the concept of the gatekeeper state that he developed in a number of article contributions in the late 1990s, and in his 2002 book-length essay Africa since 1940. the past of the present.

Cooper made some important impacts on the growing field of global history, not least with Empires in World History co-written with his wife, the historian Jane Burbank, and published in 2010. Moreover, over the course of the last decades, several topical collections of articles by a wide array of international scholars which Cooper edited or co-edited, have had a lasting impact on global historical thought and research directions. These include Struggle for the City (1983), International Development and the Social Sciences (1997), and Tensions of Empire (1997).

== Awards and honors ==
- 1982 Melville Herskovits Prize, African Studies Association, From Slaves to Squatters
- 2010 World History Association Book Prize, Empires in World History
- 2015 George Louis Beer Prize, Citizenship between Empire and Nation
- 2020 Distinguished Africanist Award, African Studies Association

== Selected publications ==
=== Books ===
- 1977 - Plantation Slavery on the East Coast of Africa (New Haven: Yale University Press)
- 1980 - From Slaves to Squatters: Plantation Labor and Agriculture in Zanzibar and Coastal Kenya, 1890-1925 (New Haven: Yale University Press)
- 1983 - Editor, Struggle for the City: Migrant Labour, Capital and the State in Urban Africa(Beverly Hills, London, New Delhi: Sage Publications)
- 1996 - Decolonization and African Society: The Labor Question in French and British Africa (Cambridge: Cambridge University Press); French translation: Décolonisation et travail en Afrique: L`Afrique britannique et francaise 1935-1960 (Paris: Karthala, 2004)
- 1997 - co-editor, with Randall M. Packard, International Development and the Social Sciences: Essays on the History and Politics of Knowledge (Berkeley: University of California Press)
- 1997 - co-editor, with Ann Laura Stoler, Tensions of Empire: Colonial Cultures in a Bourgeois World (Berkeley: University of California Press); French translation: Repenser le colonialisme (Paris: Payot, 2013)
- 2000 - with Holt, Thomas C. and Scott, Rebecca J., Beyond Slavery: Explorations of Race, Labor, and Citizenship in Postemancipation Societies (The University of North Carolina Press)
- 2002 - Africa Since 1940: The Past of the Present (Cambridge: Cambridge University Press); French translation: L'Afrique depuis 1940 (Paris, Payot, 2008)
- 2005 - Colonialism in Question: Theory, Knowledge History (Berkeley: University of California Press); French translation: Le Colonialisme en question. Théorie, connaissance, histoire (Paris, Payot, 2010); German translation Kolonialismus denken: Konzepte und Theorien in kritischer Perspektive (Frankfurt am Main: Campus, 2012)
- 2010 - in collaboration with Jane Burbank, Empires in World History. Power and the Politics of Difference, (Princeton and Oxford: Princeton University Press); German translation: Imperien der Weltgeschichte: Das Repertoire der Macht vom alten Rom und China bis heute (Frankfurt am Main: Campus, 2012)
- 2013 - Out of Empire: Redefining Africa`s Place in the World (Goettingen: Vienna University Press)
- 2014 - Africa in the World: Capitalism, Empire, Nation-State (Cambridge, MA: Harvard University Press); French translation: L'Afrique dans le monde: Capitalisme, empire, Etat-nation (Paris: Payot, 2015)
- 2014 - Citizenship between Empire and Nation: Remaking France and French Africa, 1945-60 (Princeton: Princeton University Press); French translation: Français et africains? Etre citoyen au temps de la décolonisation (Paris: Payot, 2014)
- 2018 - Citizenship, Inequality, and Difference: Historical Perspectives (Princeton: Princeton University Press)
- 2023 - in collaboration with Jane Burbank: "Post-Imperial Possibilities. Eurasia, Eurafrica, Afroasia" (Princeton & Oxford: Princeton University Press)

=== Articles ===
- 1994 - Conflict and Connection. Rethinking African Colonial History, "The American Historical Review", 99, 5: 1516-1545.
- 1996 - 'Our Strike': Equality, Anticolonial Politics, and the French West African Railway Strike of 1947-48, Journal of African History, 37: 81-118.
- 2000 - Africa's Pasts and Africa's Historians, Canadian Journal of African Studies, 34: 298-336.
- 2001 - What Is the Concept of Globalization Good For? An African Historian's Perspective, African Affairs, 100: 189-213.
- 2004 - Empire Multiplied, Comparative Studies in Society and History, 46: 247-72.
- 2000 - with Brubaker, R., Beyond Identity, Theory and Society, 29: 1-47.
- 2019 - with Brubaker, R., Empires after 1919: Old, New, Transformed, International Affairs, 95: 81-100.
- 2023 - Cooper, Frederick (20 June 2023). "Questioning Colonialism, 2005-2023". Ler História (82): 11–24. doi:10.4000/lerhistoria.11970.
