= Weekday Religious Education =

Weekday Religious Education (WRE) or Released Time for Religious Instruction (RTRI) is a released time religious education program for public school students in the United States. The program is administered during school hours, but by law must be conducted outside school property. Weekday Religious Education classes are offered in school districts in several states, most of them rural.

== History ==
In 1914, the Superintendent of Schools in Gary, Indiana, requested that local ministers teach principles of Christianity to school students during the school day. In support of WRE programs and faced with declining membership, churches argued that secular education didn't appropriately prepare students for adulthood because it excluded religious views of moral and ethical concepts. In 1946, Erwin L. Shaver wrote an article entitled, "The Movement for Weekday Religious Education" for the journal, Religious Education. At the time, religious programs enrolled over 2 million students in more than 3,000 communities in 46 states.

Programs varied state to state with various time arrangements including before or after school, early dismissal, and time during the school day called "released time". The only program questioned legally was released time where the student would leave their public school work for a set period of time at the request of their parent. This type of program was also the most attractive to church leaders because it was compulsory for students whose parents have requested the class, didn't compete with other educational options, and enticed other children to want to join both WRE and church services. Curriculum for WRE programs were developed by locally for and by the community with no accepted standards for achievement. WRE as a practice was utilized non-denominationally for Protestants, Catholics, and Jews.

In 1948, the Supreme Court of the United States ruled in re: McCollum v. Board of Education that religious classes held on public school property are unconstitutional. However, classes continued in locations where the program was held outside school grounds. (See also "Criticisms", below.) The Supreme Court later ruled, in re: Zorach v. Clauson, that religious classes held outside school grounds, but during the school day, did meet constitutional requirements dictating the separation of church and state.

An increase in WRE programs started around 2019 with the non-profit LifeWise Academy who develop curriculum to support new programs in Ohio. Since the curriculum is evangelical in nature, Catholics fear children may be less likely to attend church on Sundays for their parish's religious instruction.

== Current programs ==
Weekday Religious Education classes are currently offered in several school districts in the United States. Each program is organized locally and is funded through donations. The following is a partial list, sorted by state:

=== Idaho ===
- Kimberly

=== Indiana ===
In Fort Wayne, Indiana, classes are offered to children in the third, fourth, and fifth grades. Classes in the third grade focus upon introducing students to a "personal relationship with Jesus Christ". Third graders also learn about "Hebrew traditions", among which are "Sabbath, the Greatest Commandment, synagogue school and Jesus visiting Jerusalem". Fourth grade classes incorporate lessons about the patriarchs and other figures from the Old Testament. In the fifth grade, students are taught that the Bible is the "inspired Word of God". Classes in Fort Wayne, Indiana use the Good News Bible.

Other Indiana programs are supported by the Gideons, International and use the New King James Version of the Bible. Some programs teach Creation Science, Old and New Testament Survey and the Life of Christ as young as second grade.

- Morgan County, Indiana, established in 2004
- Plainfield, Indiana

=== Kansas ===
- Kansas City, Kansas

=== New York ===
- Valley Central

=== Ohio ===
LifeWise Academy operates 125 time release programs in school districts throughout Ohio using a plug-and-play method where the organization develops a curriculum for local churches to use, Their program includes the following districts:

- Ayersville
- Dublin
- Elida
- Hilliard
- Greenville
- Napoleon
- New Albany
- Northridge
- Olentangy Local School District
- Pandora-Gilboa
- Riverview
- Wayne Trace
- Westerville
- Whitehall
- Worthington
- Upper Arlington.
- Van Wert, LifeWise Academy's flagship program

Other programs in the state include:

- Bellefontaine, Ohio
- Bluffton
- New Riegel
- Sidney, Ohio, established in 1921 and administered by the Council of Religious Education, Inc. (CORE)
- Tiffin, Ohio

=== Utah ===
- North Sanpete

=== Virginia ===
WRE classes were first offered in Virginia in the 1920s in Arlington and Fairfax. Programs are offered in over 80 public schools in Virginia with over 12,000 students enrolled.

- Augusta County, Virginia, established in 1940
- Pulaski, Virginia
- Rockbridge County, Virginia
- Rockingham County, Virginia
- Shenandoah County, Virginia

== Criticisms ==
Dahlia Lithwick, in her article for Slate magazine, summarized several criticisms of the Weekday Religious Education program as administered at that time in Staunton, Virginia. Among these criticisms is that communities in which WRE classes are taught ostracize those students who elect to opt out of the program; that WRE classes subtract from classroom time, making education mandated by federal programs such as the No Child Left Behind Act more difficult.
