= Religious education =

Teaching of a particular religion

In secular usage, religious education is the teaching of a particular religion (although in the United Kingdom the term religious instruction would refer to the teaching of a particular religion, with religious education referring to teaching about religions in general) and its varied aspects: its beliefs, doctrines, rituals, customs, rites, and personal roles. In Western and secular culture, religious education can imply a type of education which is separate from academia, and which (generally) regards religious belief as a fundamental tenet and operating modality, as well as a prerequisite for attendance.

The secular concept is substantially different from societies that adhere to religious law, wherein "religious education" connotes the dominant academic study, and in typically religious terms, teaches doctrines which define social customs as "laws" and the violations thereof as "crimes", or else misdemeanors requiring punitive correction.

The free choice of religious education by parents according to their conviction is protected by Convention against Discrimination in Education.

Religious education is a contentious topic everywhere. Some nations, including the United States, neither publicly support religious education nor include religion in the curriculum. In other contexts, such as the United Kingdom, an 'open' religious education has emerged from Christian confessionalism that is intended to promote general religious literacy without imparting a particular religious perspective.

== Overview ==
Since people within a given country often hold varying religious and non-religious beliefs, government-sponsored religious education can be a source of conflict. Countries vary widely in whether religious education is allowed in government-run schools (often called "public schools"). Those that allow it also vary in the type of education provided.

People oppose religious education in public schools on various grounds. One is that it constitutes a state sponsorship or establishment of whatever religious beliefs are taught. Others argue that if a particular religion is taught in school, children who do not belong to that religion will either feel pressure to conform or be excluded from their peers. Proponents argue that religious beliefs have historically socialized people's behavior and morality. They feel that teaching religion in school is important to encourage children to be responsible, spiritually sound adults.

== Religious education by religion ==
=== Christianity ===
In some denominations of Christianity, catechesis refers to the religious instruction of children and adult converts.

The Church Educational System of the Church of Jesus Christ of Latter-day Saints (LDS Church) provides religious education for the youth and adults in 135 countries.

=== Islam ===
In Islamic religious schools children are taught to read and sometimes speak Arabic and memorize the major suras of the Qur'an. In the early 19th century Arabic still had a reputation as the universally understood language of science and medicine in the Islamic world while vernacular languages were spoken only in their respective countries.

In an architectural and historical context, the term generally refers to a particular kind of institution in the historic Muslim world which primarily taught Islamic law and jurisprudence (fiqh), as well as other subjects on occasion. The origin of this type of institution is widely credited to Nizam al-Mulk, a vizier under the Seljuks in the 11th century, who was responsible for building the first network of official madrasas in Iran, Mesopotamia, and Khorasan. From there, the construction of madrasas spread across much of the Muslim world over the next few centuries, often adopting similar models of architectural design.

The madrasas became the longest serving institutions of the Ottoman Empire, beginning service in 1330 and operating for nearly 600 years on three continents. They trained doctors, engineers, lawyers and religious officials, among other members of the governing and political elite. The madrasas were a specific educational institution, with their own funding and curricula, in contrast with the Enderun palace schools attended by Devshirme pupils.

=== Judaism ===
Jewish religious education mainly takes two forms: firstly, education regarding the main tenets of the faith and secondly, education regarding the laws and customs of the religion. The ultra-orthodox followers of Haredi Judaism teach only Jewish law and customs to their students, refraining from teaching any secular studies. The followers of Modern Orthodox Judaism, on the other hand, teach both secular studies and religious studies, with an emphasis on mixing Jewish values from the halakha with the secular, modern world. About Jewish religious education in a secular society, Michael Rosenak, an Israeli philosopher of Jewish education, asserts that even when non-religious Jewish educators insist that the instruction of Judaism is not only a religious matter, they agree that "the religious factor" was very important to its culture before secularism dawned on society, and that “an understanding of natural history and literature requires a sense of historical Jewish sensibility.

== Approaches in various regions ==
=== Dominican Republic ===
The Dominican Republic is a Christian state. Religious education classes must be of either a Catholic or evangelical Protestant basis and are required be taught in all elementary and secondary public schools.

=== New Zealand ===
In New Zealand, "Religious Education" refers to the academic teaching of religious studies. "Religious Instruction" refers to religious faith teaching, which occurs in private religious schools, integrated (religious) state schools or sometimes within Secular NZ State Primary Schools if directed by the individual schools' Board of Trustees. In 2017 around 40% of NZ State Primary Schools carried out religious instruction classes.

There are no officially recognised syllabuses as the school has to be officially closed in order to allow the classes to go ahead. There are organised groups such as the Secular Education Network and the NZ Association of Rationalists and Humanists, who are actively lobbying Government to have legislation changed to remove the classes from state primary schools.

=== East Asia ===
==== China ====
In the People's Republic of China, formal religious education is permitted. Religious education usually occurs in scheduled sessions in private homes. Religious teachers usually move on a weekly or monthly circuit, staying as guests in private houses in exchange for teaching.

==== Japan ====
In Japan, religious or political education, or clubs that promote a specific religious or political group, are prohibited at public schools. Private schools with a traditional connection to Buddhist sects generally do not mandate any religious study. There are many Christian schools and universities with mandatory religious education. Any religious education at private middle and high schools requires the teacher to be accredited by a university teaching the religious education standards.

=== Iran ===
About 90 percent of Iranians practice Shi'ism (Islam), the official religion of Iran. Sunni and Shi'i are the two largest branches of Islam, with the overwhelming majority of Iranians practicing Shi'i Islam.

The main religion which is being taught to students in Iran is Islam and its holy book called Quran. Students start to learn it at the elementary and secondary school (typically ages 7–14) and it is compulsory for them to learn it. The government tries to hire teachers who are kind and convincing in order to teach religious content step by step to students. Other religions are not taught in public schools. There are some private schools for the recognized minority groups who have other religions, that is Zoroastrianism, Christianity and Judaism. These schools are supervised by the Ministry of Education which imposes certain curriculum requirements. The directors of these private schools must be Muslim, with few exceptions.

=== Europe ===
==== Austria ====
Because of Austria's history as a multinational empire that included the largely Islamic Bosnia, Sunni Islam has been taught side by side with Roman Catholic, Protestant or Orthodox classes since the 19th century. However, children belonging to minority religions, such as Judaism, Buddhism and the Latter Day Saint movement also study religious education in their various denominations. At many schools, secular classes in Ethics can be attended alternatively.

==== Finland ====
In Finland religious education is mandatory subject both in comprehensive schools (7–16 years) and in senior/upper secondary schools (16–18/19 years). Most of Finnish students study Evangelical Lutheran religious education. A student can receive religious education according to his or her own religion if the denomination is registered in Finland. Since religious education is a compulsory subject, pupils who do not belong to any religious group are taught ethics. Also some non-Lutheran pupils participate in the Evangelical Lutheran religious education.

==== France ====
In France, the state recognizes no religion and does not fund religious education. However, the state subsidizes private teaching establishments, including religious ones, under strict conditions of not forcing religion courses on students and not discriminating against students according to religion. An exception is the area of Alsace–Moselle where, for historical reasons (it was ruled by Germany when this system was instituted in the rest of France) under a specific local law, the state offers publicly-sponsored catechesis or instruction in some religions (Catholic, Protestant, Jewish) mostly in accord with the German model.

==== Germany ====
Historically, the various confessions in Germany have contributed to primary and secondary education and do so still. Education in Germany still embodies the legacy of the Prussian education system introduced by Frederick the Great in 1763. The curricula of the various states of Germany since then have included not only basic technical skills but also music (singing) and religious (Christian) education in close cooperation with the churches. This has led to the churches being assigned a specific status as legal entity of public law, "Körperschaft des öffentlichen Rechts" in Germany, which is a legacy of a 1919 Weimar compromise still in force today.

Most of the federal states of Germany, which has a long history of almost even division between Roman Catholicism and Protestantism, have an arrangement whereby the religious bodies oversee the training of mainline Protestant, Catholic, and Jewish religious education teachers.

In one of the federal states this includes Orthodox Christian teachers as well. In Berlin, Bremen (see Bremen clause) and Brandenburg, religious education is not mandatory. E.g. in Bremen, state-authorized "Bible studies" were offered which were not supervised by a specific confession.

The training is supposed to be conducted according to modern standards of the humanities, and by teachers trained at mostly state-run colleges and universities. Those teachers teach religion in public schools, are paid by the state and are bound to the German constitution, as well as answerable to the churches for the content of their teaching. Children who are part of no mainstream religion (this applies e.g. to members of the New Apostolic Church) still have to take part in the classes of one of the confessions or, if they want to opt out, attend classes in Ethics or Philosophy instead. The Humanistischer Verband Deutschlands, an atheist and agnostic association, has adopted to the legal setup of the churches and is now allowed to offer such classes. From the age of 14, children may decide on their own if they want to attend religion classes and, if they do, which of those they are willing to attend. For younger children it is the decision of their parents. The state also subsidizes approved private substitute schools ("Ersatzschulen"), including religious and Waldorf education schools: in North Rhine-Westphalia the state covers the schools' costs, with the schools' own share being as low as 2% where they provide their own buildings, and in Berlin the subsidy for approved Ersatzschulen is set at 93% of the personnel costs of the corresponding public schools. A school's educational aims and facilities must not fall behind those of public schools, a condition of its approval as an Ersatzschule.

The introduction of Islamic religious education in Germany has faced various burdens and thresholds, but it is being introduced currently. While there are around three million Muslims, mostly of Turkish origin, now in the country (see Islam in Germany), not many of them are members of a legal entity with which the states could arrange such matters (unlike the Christian churches' representatives and the humanists). In 2013, for the first time in German history, the state of Hessen acknowledged a Muslim community, the reform-oriented Ahmadiyya, as Körperschaft des öffentlichen Rechts for all of Germany, which has been deemed a historical milestone. Ahmadiyya applied for the status just to be able to offer religious education in state schools, but is allowed now to maintain its own cemeteries and have its members' fees collected by the state's church tax system.

==== Greece ====
In Greece, students at public primary and secondary schools (typically ages 6–17) learn the basics of the Greek Orthodox faith using the official curriculum. In accordance to EU's religious freedom rules, their parents can opt them out of the religious classes by requesting it in paper without any additional justification. Students above the age of 18 can opt out by themselves. The students that opt-out attend alternative (non-religious) courses.

Universities (which are mostly public) don't have any religious content unless it's related to the studies.

==== Italy ====
In Italy, Catholic religious education is a curricula subject for students attending primary and secondary school (ages 6–19), though students can opt out of religious classes and attend alternative courses instead. Alternatively, if religious class takes place in the first or last hour, non-attending students can enter late to school or go out early. It consists of an optional hour a week for any primary and secondary school curriculum.

Data shows that the percentage of students who choose to attend religious class is in steady decline. In 2020, the percentage was 86%.

Religious education was first introduced as a mandatory activity in Italy during the fascist regime, following the 1929 Lateran Treaty, but in 1984 it became optional.

The law n. 186 of 2003 instituted the possibility of a national public recruiting for the religion professors to be enrolled within the Italian primary and secondary schools. The teachers become public servants waged directly by the Minister of Public Education and not removable from their working place. A specific norm enforced the right for enrolled religion professors to be destinated to different teaching matters, compatible with their academic degrees, if they were denied of the needy diocesan license or by effect of a personal request for a job transfer. To be admitted to the public recruiting selection the teachers need a specific teaching license released by their diocesan bishop. In 2004 it was held the first national and public recruiting selection of this type. Another has been forecasted until December 2021, after an agreement signed by Cardinal Gualtiero Bassetti and the Italian Minister of Public Education Lucia Azzolina.

On February 13, 2019, the Italian minister Marco Bussetti and the Cardinal Giuseppe Versaldi, Prefect of the Congregation for Catholic Education, signed an agreement for mutual recognition of academic qualifications issued in the universities of Holy See and Italy. The agreement increased significantly the number of degree titles recognized in the Italian public schools.

Religious education in Italian public schools is controversial. For some, studying Catholic religion is important to understand Italy's historic, cultural and artistic heritage, while for others it is considered in contrast with the constitutional principles of secularity and religious freedom and also not appropriate for an increasingly diverse society. Some believe that religious education should be of exclusive competence of families and churches, therefore are opposed to religious education in public schools. However, the study of religion is always an optional choice in the public primary and secondary schools. The history of religions is taught within the scholastic curriculum of history, while some religious aspects are also integrated within the philosophy education of the Italian lyceums.

==== Latvia ====
In Latvia, since 2004 parents of the primary school students (grades 1 to 3) can choose Christian classes or the ethics. Christian classes are interdenominational (based on common Lutheran, Roman Catholic, Orthodox, Baptist, Old Believer grounds).

==== Netherlands ====
In the Netherlands, a distinction is made between public and special schools. Special schools teach on the basis of religion, philosophy of life or a vision of education. Public school lessons are not based on religion or belief. Public primary schools are most strongly represented in 2019 (31.6%), followed by Roman Catholic schools (30.5%), Protestant Christian primary schools (29.6%) and by primary schools with a denomination in the category 'other special' (8.3%). The relationship between schools with different denominations has remained stable in recent years. The government pays for both types of education. For this, schools must meet conditions. For example, education must be of sufficient quality. There are also requirements, for example, for the minimum number of pupils, the competence of teachers and the number of hours of education.

==== Poland ====
In Poland, religious education is optional in state schools. Parents decide whether children should attend religion classes or ethics classes or none of them. When a student reaches the age of 18, only then it becomes their formal autonomous decision to choose either subject or neither of them. Since 2007 until 2024, grades from religion (or ethics) classes were counted towards the grade point average.

==== Romania ====
Religious education is optional in Romanian state schools. Parents can freely choose which religion their children will study, but a majority of religious classes focus on the Romanian Orthodox faith, which is the majority religion in the country.

==== Turkey ====
Institutional education in general, and religious education in particular, is centralized in Turkey. This approach began with the Unity of Education Law, which was first drafted in 1924 and preserved in subsequent legal reforms and constitutional changes. Due to the secular revolution, previous practices of the Ottoman education system were abandoned. The newer Unity of Education Law was interpreted as totally excluding religious instruction from public schools. The newly established Republic of Turkey aimed to be secular and more western with the rule of Atatürk. In 1923, changes such as the acceptance of the Latin alphabet, which is taught to pupils in the national schools, and the Gregorian calendar took place in the new established country. With the closure of Madrasas, which were provided for the society to have religious knowledge and education, classes of religion were also abolished from the schools. Religious education such as Quran courses or other religious activities had to be controlled by the government and separated from regular education.

The situation changed in 1946 when the one-party period came to an end. The faculty of Divinity was introduced in 1949 at Ankara University to educate, raise and train Imams, carry out scientific research about religion, mostly Islam. In 1956, as a result of multiparty democracy, a new government led by the former Democratic Party was established. This government introduced a religion course into secondary schools. With the Democrat Party, religion started to show up as a lecture in the schools with the name of ‘The culture of religion and Knowledge of Ethics’ but parents had to give their permission. Furthermore, Imam Hatip schools were established in some cities of Turkey with a limited number of students. In the following years, until the 1980 coup, the number of Imam Hatip Schools and religious education increased in Turkey. After the military coup in 1980, religious education in school was transformed and became a compulsory part of the curriculum, with the "Culture of Religion and Knowledge of Ethics" course. The content of religious education was prepared by the state, which ensured that children were first exposed to accepted interpretations of Islam before being exposed to other religious teachings.

In the late 1990s, the right of students who are graduated from Imam Hatip schools was limited with the education reform bill. Moreover, the middle school Imam Hatip schools converted to regular high schools for students to continue their higher education with other fields rather than Theology or Dignity faculties as their wish. Besides, in the beginning of 2000's a new law led to a decrease in the number of Quran courses because the law introduce for the students to attend Quran courses after they finished their eight year of education rather than five.

==== United Kingdom ====
Schools approach the education of faith and religious matters in divergent manners across the four countries that constitute the United Kingdom (UK). For instance, presently schools in England and Northern Ireland respectively must teach a subject called Religious Education (RE), schools in Scotland must teach Religious and Moral Education (RME) and schools in Wales must teach Religion, Values and Ethics (RVE). Despite the matching designation of the subject in England and Northern Ireland (and the similar naming of the subjects more generally across the UK), the subjects have distinct subject matter, which is determined differently.

To expand, in England, RE occupies an unusual position in the curriculum; it is part of the Basic Curriculum and not the National Curriculum. Until the introduction of the National Curriculum, RE was the only compulsory subject in state schools. The most recent and relevant legislation on RE in England is the Education Reform Act 1988. This Act states that each Local Authority in England must create a locally agreed syllabus for RE lessons, for any maintained school in their area without a religious character. Examples of maintained school include community schools, foundation schools, voluntary aided schools and voluntary controlled schools. Local Authorities in England must do this through organising a Standing Advisory Council on Religious Education, in which representatives of local religious faith communities, teachers and the local authority itself participate, to determine the subject aims, approach and matter which will be taught in the schools of the Local Authority. Foundation schools, voluntary aided schools and voluntary controlled schools may have a religious character and/or ethos and this may affect the way which RE is taught in their settings. For instance, in foundation and voluntary controlled schools with a religious character, RE must be taught in accordance with the locally agreed syllabus, unless parents request RE in accordance with the trust deed of the school; in voluntary aided schools, RE must be taught in accordance with the trust deed.

As of 2024, the majority of schools in England are academies. The Academies Act 2010 introduced academies in England; these are funded by the state but exist outside Local Authority control. While academy leaders may choose to follow the locally agreed curriculum for their area, there is no legal condition for them to do so and they may produce their own, provided that it meets the requirements of a locally agreed syllabus, given in section 375(3) of the Education Act 1996 and paragraph 5 of Schedule 19 of the School Standards and Framework Act 1998. These provisions include that any locally agreed syllabus ‘shall reflect the fact that the religious traditions in Great Britain are in the main Christian whilst taking account of the teaching and practices of the other principal religions represented in Great Britain'. State school religious education is non-proselytising and covers a variety of faiths, although the legislation requires it to include more Christian content than other faiths. The Education Reform Act 1988 also states that the parents of any pupil attending a maintained school may request that their child does not attend religious worship, attending or receiving any form of RE either wholly or partly, and that this request should be granted and the pupil excused until the request is withdrawn.

In Northern Ireland, RE is taught according to a core curriculum, which was developed by church groups and the Council for Curriculum, Examinations and Assessment (CCEA). The subject includes the study of Christianity, morality and the main religions of the world. In Key Stage 4, pupils should examine the perspectives of different church groups. As in England, parents have the right to withdraw their children from RE lessons.

In Scotland, RME differs in non-denominational schools and Roman Catholic schools. In non-denominational schools, the subject matter includes the study of Christianity, the major world religions, and non-religious beliefs. In Roman Catholic schools, the subject includes the study of Catholic Christianity and the major world religions. As in England and Northern Ireland, parents have the right to withdraw their children from RME lessons. The Church of Scotland does not have schools, although it does often have a presence in Scottish non-denominational institutions.

In Wales, RVE includes the study of Christianity and the other major religions of the world. The subject must also be taught in a way that reflects that a range of philosophical or non-religious beliefs exist in Wales. The subject should always be taught objectively and critically and RE teachers should adopt an unbiased approach to the subject that does not encourage a religious or non-religious point of view. Unlike England, Northern Ireland and Scotland, parents are not permitted to withdraw their children from RVE lessons.

In 2010, academics noted that RE had become overburdened with expectations in the UK, including acquiring and developing knowledge and understanding of Christianity and the other principal religions, developing the ability to make reasoned and informed judgements about religious and moral issues, enhancing pupils' spiritual, moral, cultural and social development, developing positive attitudes towards others.

=== North America ===
==== Canada ====
In Canada, religious education has varying status. On the one hand, publicly funded and organized separate schools for Roman Catholics and Protestants are mandated in some provinces and in some circumstances by various sections of the Constitution Act, 1867. On the other hand, with a growing level of multiculturalism, particularly in Ontario, debate has emerged as to whether publicly funded religious education for one group is permissible. For example, Newfoundland withdrew funding for Protestant and Roman Catholic schools in 1995, after a constitutional amendment. Quebec abolished religious education funded by the state through the Education Act, 1998, which took effect on July 1 of that same year, again after a constitutional amendment. Quebec re-organized the schools along linguistic rather than religious lines. In Ontario, however, the move to abolish funding has been strongly resisted. In the 2007 provincial election, the topic of funding for faith-based schools that were not Catholic became a major topic. The provincial conservative party was defeated due, in part, to their support of the idea.

==== United States ====
In the United States, religious education is often provided voluntarily through supplementary "Sunday school", "Hebrew school", or catechism classes, taught to children at their families' places of worship, either in conjunction with worship services or some other time during the week, after weekday school classes. Some families believe supplementary religious education is inadequate, and send their children to private religious schools, called parochial schools when Catholic, day schools or yeshivas when Jewish. Many faiths also offer private college and graduate-level religious schools or seminaries, some of which are accredited as colleges.

In public schools, U.S. law allows for religious education under released time during school hours; LifeWise Academy and Child Evangelism Fellowship are examples of voluntary Christian programs that utilize this. Additionally, under U.S. law, religious education in public schools is permittable if it is done from a neutral, academic perspective.

=== South Asia ===
==== India ====
In India, religious instructions are prohibited by the constitution in public schools and are optional in schools receiving grants from the government but are otherwise private. On the other hand, there are a number of private schools run by religious institutions, especially for Hindus, Muslims, Sikhs, Christians, Jains and Buddhists. During the era of British rule, Christian private schools were quite prominent and widely attended by both UK (British) and Indian students. Many of the schools established during this era, especially in areas with a heavy Christian population, are still in existence today. In addition to regular formal education, a number of religious institutions have instituted regular informal religious/spiritual education programs for children and adults.

==== Pakistan ====
In Pakistan, Muslim students must take Islamic studies from primary to higher education. The subject is optional for non-Muslim students, who can choose the subject of ethics instead. The emphasis on religious studies in Pakistan's education system began when the nation was established in 1947. As a result, students in both public and private schools in Pakistan have the opportunity to learn subjects such as arts, science, English, and mathematics. However, in contrast, students in seminaries do not engage in any of these subjects.

=== Southeast Asia ===
In Thailand, Burma and other majority Buddhist societies, Buddhist teachings and social decorum are sometimes taught in public school. Young men are expected to live as monks for several months at one time in their lives during which they can receive religious education.

== See also ==
- Buddhist Studies
- Character education
- Christian views on the classics
- Freedom of education
- Islamic studies
- Jewish day school
- Parochial school
- Private school
- Religion and children
- Religious education in primary and secondary education
- Religious studies
- Sanam Luang Dhamma Studies
- State religion
- Tripiṭaka
