= Jewish Released Time =

Jewish learning initiative

Logo of the Sheloh organization

Jewish Released Time, also known as Sheloh (an abbreviation for Shi'urei Limud Hados (Classes for Learning the Religion)), is an organization promoting released time for the Jewish education of Jewish children learning in public schools.

== History ==
In 1943, Rabbi Yosef Yitzchok Schneersohn founded Sheloh as a part of Merkos L'Inyonei Chinuch, the educational branch of the Chabad-Lubavitch movement. The program was first directed by Rabbi Y. Feldman. In 1945, Rabbi Jacob J. Hecht was appointed director, and continued in this position until his death in 1990. Rabbi Schneersohn, and his son in-law and successor Rabbi Menachem Mendel Schneerson, were constantly involved in the program. In 1961, when the legality of the Released Time hour was challenged in Washington, D.C., Rabbi Schneerson worked hard to fight for its continuation, even sending a delegation to Washington to support it.

== Description ==
These classes take place off public school premises, in keeping with the United States Supreme Court decision in McCollum v. Board of Education (1948). Generally they are held in a nearby synagogue, but if none is available, they may be held in a wedding hall or similar venue.

Jewish released time classes, like those organized by other religious groups, take place for one hour each week (generally on Wednesdays), at the end of the school day. In these classes, children are taught to recite basic Jewish prayers, and learn about the Torah, Jewish history, Jewish law, and Jewish ethics. The teachers are Rabbinical students from the local central Lubavitcher Yeshiva Tomchei Temimim; for locations where there is no such Yeshiva, the teacher is the local Shliach or one of his assistants.

Sheloh's 1946 year-end summary stated that there were 5000 children from 150 different public schools attending their classes every week, with separate classes for boys and girls. By the later 1940s, there were 10,000 children attending Released Time's weekly sessions. (Decades later the classes became generally co-educational.)

Given the limited amount of time, actual reading of Hebrew was not part of the curriculum.

=== Zorach v. Clauson ===
In 1952, the case of Zorach v. Clauson came before the Supreme Court. The case involved the education law of New York State, particularly a regulation by which a public school was permitted to release students during school hours for religious instruction or devotional exercises. In a 6 to 3 ruling, the high court upheld the New York law.

In the majority opinion, Justice William O. Douglas wrote that New York's program "involves neither religious instruction in public schools nor the expenditure of public funds", unlike the earlier McCollum case that the Zorach plaintiffs had cited as precedent.

Douglas wrote that a public school "may not coerce anyone to attend church, to observe a religious holiday, or to take religious instruction. But it can close its doors or suspend its operations as to those who want to repair to their religious sanctuary for worship or instruction. No more than that is undertaken here."

The Court's opinion stated that:

"In the McCollum case the classrooms were used for religious instruction and the force of the public school was used to promote that instruction. Here, as we have said, the public schools do no more than accommodate their schedules to a program of outside religious instruction. We follow the McCollum case. But we cannot expand it to cover the present released time program unless separation of Church and State means that public institutions can make no adjustments of their schedules to accommodate the religious needs of the people. We cannot read into the Bill of Rights such a philosophy of hostility to religion."

== Today ==
Sheloh is a division of The National Committee for the Furtherance of Jewish Education, founded by Rabbi Jacob J. Hecht. The current chairman of NCFJE is Rabbi Sholem Hecht, and the director of Sheloh is Rabbi Zalman Zirkind.

Sheloh's mission has broadened to include assisting children who are interested in full-time Jewish education to enroll in Yeshivos. Sheloh also hosts other programs such as Released Time Winter Camp and Shabbatons (Shabbat get-togethers). These activities, in turn, have led to many parents becoming Baalei teshuva as a result of their children's interest in Judaism.

== See also ==
- Released time
- Chabad-Lubavitch
- Baal teshuva
