= Sheloh =

Sheloh may refer to:

- Rabbi Isaiah Horowitz (c. 1565 – 1630), the Shelah HaKodesh ('the Holy Shelah')
- Jewish Released Time, a Jewish education oorganisation
