= Dannel McCollum =

American politician

Daniel McCollum

Mayor of Champaign, Illinois
- In office 1987–1999

Personal details
- Parent: Vashti McCollum (mother)
- Occupation: Politician

Dannel McCollum is a former American politician who served as the mayor of Champaign, Illinois, from 1987 to 1999.

He is also the author of the book The Lord Was Not on Trial about his mother Vashti McCollum's landmark 1948 Supreme Court case McCollum v. Board of Education, which struck down religious education in public schools. He also wrote the book Remembering Champaign County.
