= Van Wert City School District =

School district in Ohio, United States

Address
- 205 West Crawford Street Van Wert, Ohio, 45891; United States
- Coordinates: 40°52′4″N 84°35′0″W

District information
- Type: Public
- Grades: PK–12
- Schools: 4
- NCES District ID: 3910023

Students and staff
- Students: 1,943 (2025–2026)
- Teachers: 124.70 (on an FTE basis) (2025–2026)
- Staff: 375.03 (on an FTE basis) (2025–2026)
- Student–teacher ratio: 15.58 (2025–2026)

Other information
- Website: www.vwcs.net

Van Wert City School District is a public school district serving students in the city of Van Wert, along with Liberty, Pleasant, and Ridge townships in Van Wert County in the U.S. state of Ohio. The school district enrolls 2,082 students as of the 2012–2013 academic year.

The school district offers a released time bible education program through LifeWise Academy for elementary, middle school, and high school students. It is the flagship program for LifeWise.

== Schools ==
=== Elementary schools ===
- Van Wert Elementary School (kindergarten through 5th)

=== Middle schools ===
- Van Wert Middle School (grades 6th through 8th)

=== High schools ===
- Van Wert High School (grades 9th through 12th)

=== Other schools ===
- Van Wert Early Childhood Center (kindergarten and preschool)
- Kids Learning Place (0-12yrs)
- Lifelinks Community School (grades 6th through 12th)
