= Ayersville =

Ayersville may refer to:

- Ayersville, Georgia
- Ayersville, Ohio
