= LifeWise Academy =

American Christian educational program

LifeWise Academy is an Ohio-based Christian educational program founded in 2018 to provide off-site Bible education for public school students during school hours under released time laws. LifeWise Academy states that it is interdenominational, aligned "with historic, orthodox Christian beliefs as expressed in the Nicene Creed." LifeWise Academy was founded in 2018 by Joel Penton, a former Ohio State defensive lineman. LifeWise Academy operates under released time for religious instruction laws which were upheld in the 1952 US Supreme Court ruling Zorach v. Clauson. Programs are staffed by a director, teachers, and volunteers, who help transport students and assist in classrooms as needed, paid by LifeWise Academy. In the 2020s, Lifewise Academy has experienced rapid growth across the United States.

== History ==
LifeWise Academy was founded in 2018 by Joel Penton, a former Ohio State defensive lineman, as a division of the nonprofit ministry Stand for Truth, where Penton serves as executive director. The organization was inspired by the weekday religious education program in his hometown of Van Wert, Ohio, in 2012, and its programming is designed for public school students. Penton has described public schools as a "mission field."

LifeWise Academy programs receive funding from local churches, private donors, and grants from organizations such as the National Christian Foundation. For fiscal year 2024, LifeWise's largest received donation of $13,168,399 was made by the donor-advised fund American Endowment Foundation. By the 2025-26 school year, LifeWise expected to serve approximately 100,000 students across 34 states. The organization employs 1,600 staff members and operates its own fleet of buses for student transportation.

LifeWise Academy states that it is an ecumenical organization aligned "with historic, orthodox Christian beliefs as expressed in the Nicene Creed." With regard to varying theological opinions in Christianity, the LifeWise curriculum informs its "teachers to say there are different churches and that sincere Christians have different views on these topics" and because of Christian denominational differences, it focuses on common teachings that are shared by the major Christian denominations. The founder Joel Penton noted that Lifewise Academy had teachers from various Christian denominations, including evangelicals and Catholics.

In December 2023, Lifewise Academy purchased a 23,000-square-foot facility, formerly Aquatic Adventures, in Hilliard, Ohio to serve as a training and conference center.

In 2024, LifeWise Academy launched the first Oklahoma program at Tahlequah Public Schools. LifeWise operates in 30 states.

In June 2025, former Lewisburg, Ohio LifeWise Academy program teacher filed an age-based labor discrimination claim with the Ohio Civil Rights Commission (OCRC). LifeWise denied the claims, filing a writ of mandamus asking the Ohio Supreme Court to block the OCRC investigation, citing the “ministerial exception.” In October 2025, the Ohio Supreme Court granted the ex-employee the right to sue.

In September 2025, the Heritage Foundation recognized LifeWise Academy with an Innovation Award.

On July 8, 2026, The Columbus Dispatch noted that participation in LifeWise "increased more than 11,000% since 2019."

== Activities ==
In 2025, LifeWise Academy supported legislation in Alabama (House Bill 342) that would require public school districts to award elective credit for students participating in religious release time programs. Derek Stemen, a LifeWise vice president, testified in favor of the bill.

LifeWise lobbied Oklahoma lawmakers to pass House Bill 1425, sponsored by Rep. Clay Staires and Senator Dave Rader, supplying them with “education materials about legislation that is aligned with our mission.”

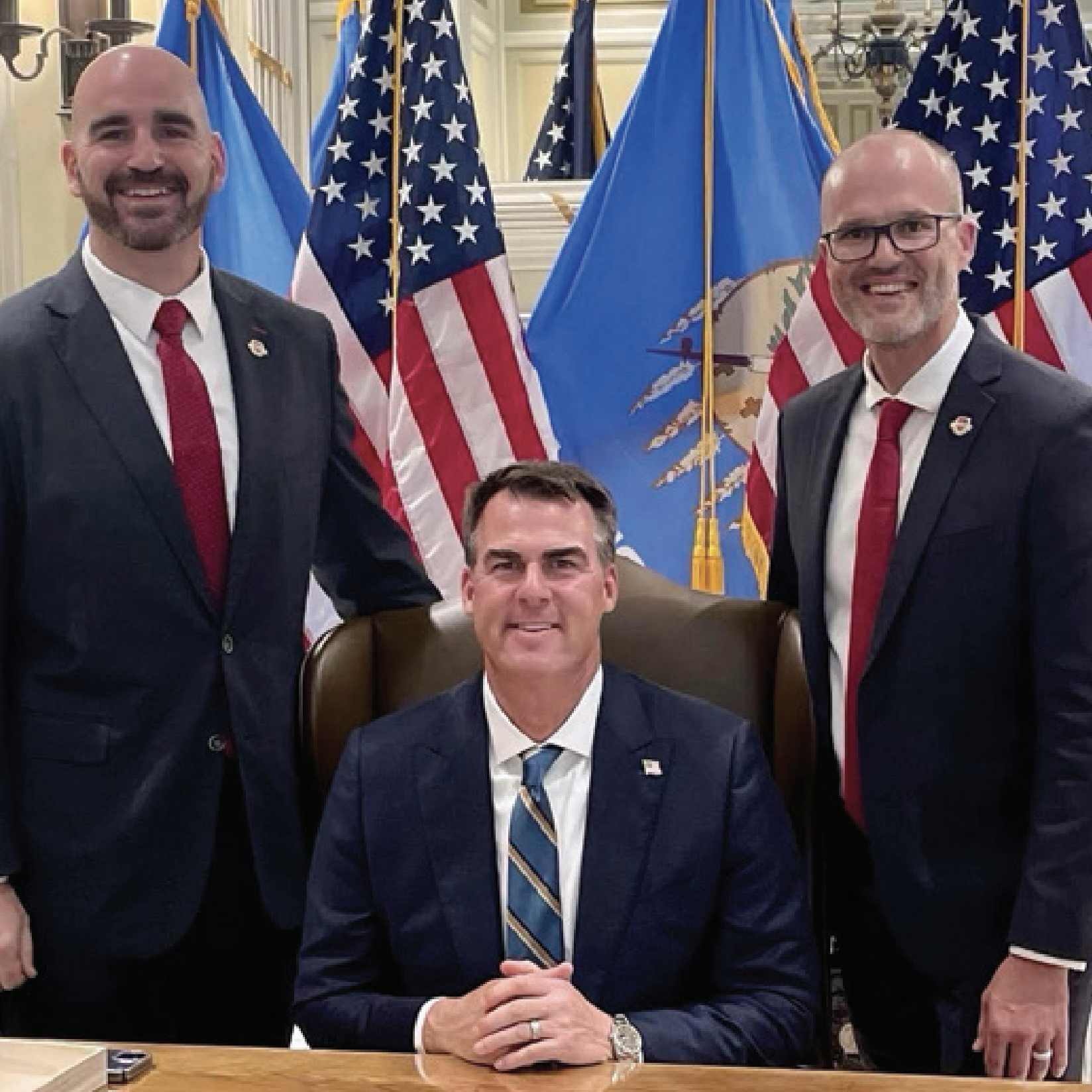
LifeWise Academy leaders, Joel Penton and Steve Clifton, attending signing of House Bill 1425, with Oklahoma Governor Kevin Stitt.

== Programming ==
LifeWise Academy operates under released time for religious instruction laws which were upheld in the 1952 US Supreme Court ruling, Zorach v. Clauson. This ruling allowed a school district to allow students to leave school for part of the day to receive religious instruction. However, three requirements needed to be met: classes are off school property; it's privately funded; and students participate with the permission of their parents. Release time programs are traditionally locally run and managed, whereas LifeWise Academy is a franchise model working with local steering committees to advocate for the program in their districts, including running for school board.

Programs are staffed by a director, teachers, and volunteers, who help transport students and assist in classrooms as needed, paid by LifeWise Academy. High school programs may offer high school or college credits. In Ohio, the instruction can't take place during a “core curriculum” subject, often meeting at the same time as art or music classes, library periods, or during lunch.

=== Curriculum ===
LifeWise Academy's curriculum is based on The Gospel Project, a Bible study program produced by LifeWay Christian Resources designed for elementary school students as a five-year program covering the full Bible.

LifeWise is required to provide access to its full curriculum upon request.

== Reception ==
A Fall 2023 study by Indiana consulting firm Thomas P. Miller & Associates found that schools that use LifeWise have improved attendance and fewer suspensions. The report quoted a principal in Columbus City Schools stating she had witnessed improvements, including higher grades, increased school attendance and fewer disciplinary actions among students who participate in Lifewise. The validity of the study's methodology has been questioned by Honesty for Ohio Education and other researchers, noting that it included data from the COVID-19 pandemic year when states had modified attendance tracking methods due to remote learning.

=== Among Christians ===
Leaders in progressive Christian groups have expressed concerns that the program disrupts school days and constitutes "right-wing encroachment on public education.” Some clergies claim to have been excluded from community decision-making processes.

The socially conservative Family Research Council praised LifeWise Academy for its expansion, citing a 2023 study finding that students in the program performed well on exams and had better class attendance.

=== Among parents ===
In 2024, an organizer for the Secular Education Association (formerly known as Parents Against LifeWise) was sued by LifeWise Academy for copyright violations after publishing LifeWise's training materials and Bible study curriculum online without permission. The lawsuit was settled, with terms requiring the organizer to destroy all copies of the LifeWise curriculum in his possession, while LifeWise was required to provide access to its full curriculum for 48 hours at a time upon request.

In March 2024, another Ohio parent launched a website called "Respect Public Schools" with a map of school districts with LifeWise Academy operations.

== Program oversight ==
In July 2024, LifeWise fired a program director in Firelands, Ohio upon discovering that the employee, a former teacher, had her teaching license revoked following allegations of sexting with students. LifeWise stated the worker had previously failed to disclose the information.

LifeWise has faced controversy for allegedly attempting to cover up child rape by its employees and for successfully opposing a requirement that LifeWise employees be subject to background checks before being allowed control over children.

== School policies ==
=== Alabama ===
In April 2025, Alabama adopted Senate Bill 278, requiring local school boards to decide whether to permit students to leave campus for religious instruction and to determine whether such participation may qualify for academic credit. The bill was sponsored by Senators Shay Shelnut and Susan DuBose. LifeWise Academy representatives testified in favor of similar legislation in Alabama earlier that year.

=== Indiana ===
In 2024, Indiana enacted a law requiring public schools to accommodate released-time religious instruction following a district’s decision to stop cooperating with LifeWise Academy. In July 2025, New Prairie United School District declined to authorize a LifeWise program, citing the group’s failure to provide copies of required background checks for employees and volunteers.

=== Kentucky ===
A 2025 Kentucky law allowed school boards to partner with organizations that provide religious or ethical instruction to students. Following the change, LifeWise Academy expressed interest in partnering with Oldham County Schools to offer elective courses.

=== Nebraska ===
In 2025, Nebraska legislator Loren Lippincott introduced a bill modeled on other released-time education measures with testimony in support from a LifeWise representative. The proposal was later removed from a broader education bill.

=== New Jersey ===
In late 2024, a steering committee associated with Landmark Church proposed introducing a LifeWise released-time program for students in Ocean City, New Jersey.

=== Ohio ===
Ohio has been a focal point for LifeWise operations and related policy debates. While many districts have hosted programs under the state’s released-time law, some have since rescinded their policies. In 2023, atheist group Freedom From Religion Foundation sent letters to roughly 600 Ohio districts urging them to avoid partnership with LifeWise and to maintain secular instruction. Ohio Attorney General David Yost subsequently reaffirmed the legality of released-time programs under state law, provided participation remains voluntary, privately funded, and off-campus.

Following LifeWise's expansion, Columbus City Schools banned religious groups from distributing materials, snacks, clothing, candies, trinkets or other items to students returning from off-campus instruction. The Ohio legislature subsequently amended the law to prohibit districts from preventing organizations from distributing educational materials, while giving districts some discretion over non-educational items.

=== Oklahoma ===
In 2024, Oklahoma enacted House Bill 1425, requiring public school districts to establish policies permitting students to attend off-campus religious instruction during the school day. The bill was sponsored by Representative Clay Staires and Senator David Rader. LifeWise Academy lobbied in favor of the legislation. Under the new law, students may attend religious classes for up to three periods per week, and schools are permitted to recognize academic credit for such participation. Private funding for Oklahoma programs has been provided by businesses including Regent Bank, Kimray, and Hobby Lobby.

=== Texas ===
By early 2025, LifeWise Academy had launched programs in several Texas cities, including Amarillo and Abilene. Elementary students in these districts attended weekly or biweekly off-site Bible lessons during lunch or recess, with one site offering bilingual instruction. A statewide poll of 800 registered voters conducted by RMG Research found that 80% supported moral and character education in public schools, and 65% supported Bible-based instruction during school hours if it remained off-campus, privately funded, and voluntary. In June 2025, Governor Greg Abbott signed Senate Bill 1049 into law, authorizing students to be excused from public school for up to five hours per week to attend religious instruction.

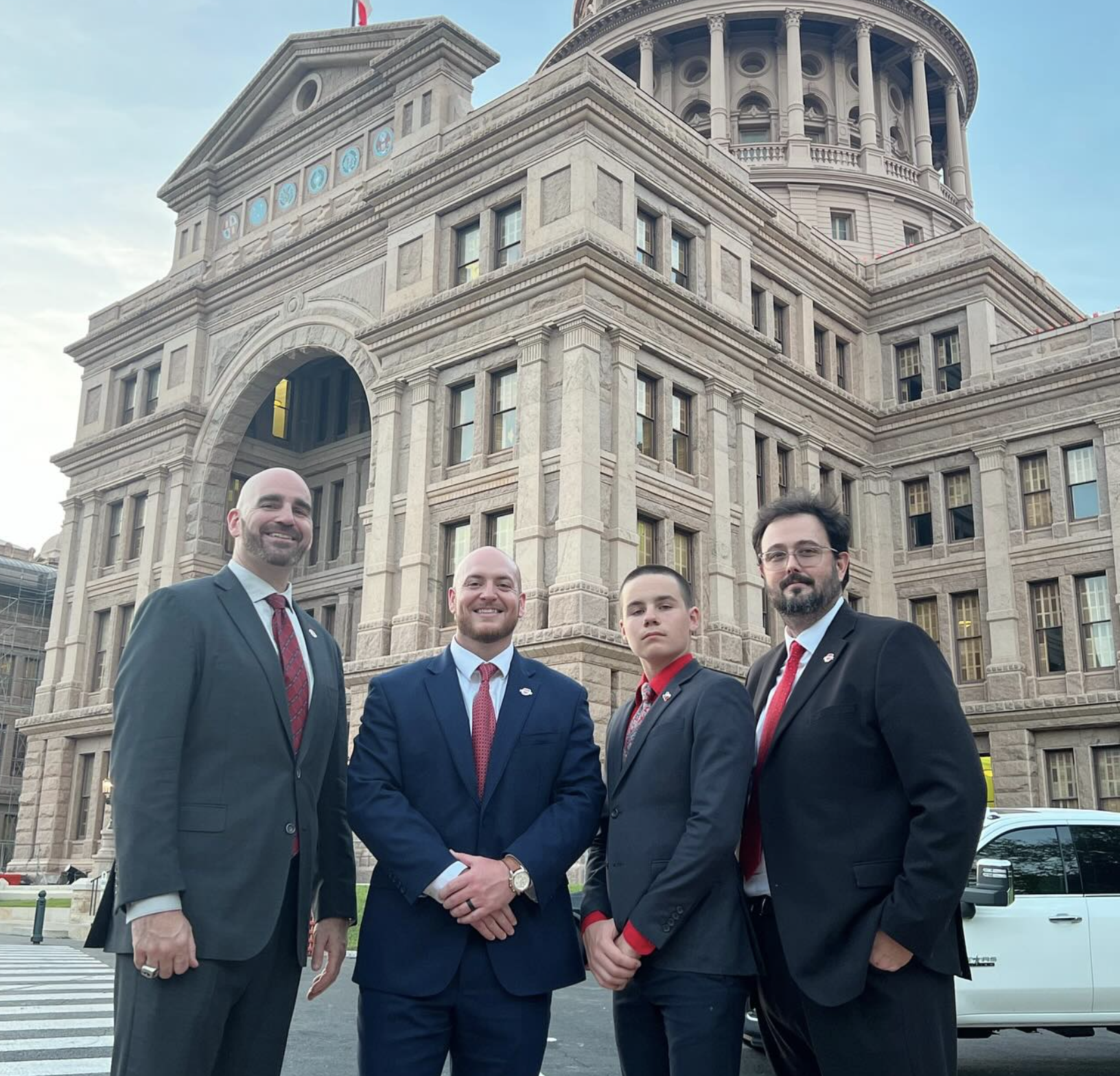
LifeWise CEO, Joel Penton, and Texas state directors at Texas capitol

=== Washington ===
In January 2025, LifeWise Academy began operating in Washington State, offering off-campus Bible instruction for students near Emerson Elementary in Everett. The program meets during lunch and recess at New Hope Assembly Church and operates independently of the Everett Public Schools district. By mid-2025, LifeWise had expanded operations to Spokane and Aberdeen.

== Controversies ==
In May 2026, three former employees of LifeWise were charged in Ohio sex crime cases involving minors, though law enforcement noted that the misconduct did not occur during LifeWise programming. Lifewise responded that the crimes were "deeply disturbing" but noted that it "received zero reports of misconduct involving LifeWise students in connection with these matters or during LifeWise activities more broadly." Lifewise additionally noted that at the time of hiring the charged individuals the persons underwent background checks through ADP Screening and Selection Services.

Renee Beck, a former public school teacher of Loudonville High School, was fired from her job due to "serious misconduct and abuse of a minor student"; Lifewise hired Beck, but fired her in July 2024 after it "learned about the allegations against Beck". Lifewise noted that Beck failed to "disclose important information to LifeWise staff about her employment history" and that it was "grateful to resolve this matter before the program's local launch".

In 2024, Lifewise hired a daycare operator in Sandusky, Ohio who had been charged with misdemeanor child endangerment "after a 2-year-old in her care was found wandering alone in the street." The daycare operator "told police she believed the child was sleeping downstairs while she was upstairs."
