= Van Wert High School =

Location
- 10708 State Route 118; Van Wert, Ohio 45891; United States; 40°50′43″N 84°36′25″W

Information
- School type: Public
- School district: Van Wert City School District
- Principal: Chuck Rollins
- Staff: 28.34 (FTE)
- Enrollment: 585 (2023-2024)
- Student to teacher ratio: 20.64
- Education system: Project-based learning
- Colors: Scarlet and gray
- Athletics conference: Western Buckeye League
- Mascot: Claw'd
- Team name: Cougar
- Website: vwcs.net/schools/van-wert-high-school

Van Wert High School is a public high school in Van Wert, Ohio, United States. It is the only high school in the Van Wert City School District. The school's athletic teams are named the Cougars and are represented by the mascot, Claw'd. The school's athletic conference is the Western Buckeye League.

== Athletics ==
=== State championships ===
- Football: 2020

=== State runners-up ===
- Football: 2000
- Boys cross Country: 1988
- Boys golf: 1985

=== State final four ===
- Boys basketball: 1987, 1990, 1992

== Notable alumni and faculty ==
- Charles W. Clark, baritone singer
- Weeb Ewbank, member of Pro Football Hall of Fame; began head coaching career at Van Wert
- Walter Hinton, aviation pioneer
- James S. Kemper- US Ambassador to Brazil and founder of Kemper Insurance
- Jack Lininger, football player
- Larry Smith, head football coach at Tulane, Arizona, Southern California, and Missouri; TV analyst
- Jim Young, head football coach at Arizona, Purdue, and Army
