= Vashti McCollum =

American activist (1912–2006)

- Born: Vashti Ruth Cromwell; November 6, 1912; Lyons, New York
- Died: August 20, 2006 (aged 93); Champaign, Illinois
- Education: BA Liberal Arts and Sciences, MA Mass Communications
- Alma mater: University of Illinois at Urbana-Champaign
- Spouse: John Paschal McCollum
- Parent(s): Mr. and Mrs Arthur G. Cromwell

Vashti Cromwell McCollum (November 6, 1912 – August 20, 2006) was the plaintiff in the landmark 1948 Supreme Court case McCollum v. Board of Education, which struck down religious education in public schools. The defendant in the case was the public school district of Champaign, Illinois; instructors chosen by three religious faiths had taught religion classes within the district's schools.

McCollum wrote a book on the case, One Woman's Fight (1953), became a world traveler and served two terms as president of the American Humanist Association from 1962 to 1965. She was also a signer of the Humanist Manifesto II in October 1973 and the Humanist Manifesto III in 2003.

In 1948, McCollum made this statement to The New York Times: "As long as the public school is used to recruit the child into any religious denomination or to segregate children as per varying religious doctrines or whose power of truancy is employed to make them attend theology classes, I'm against it".

== Early life ==
Named after the Old Testament Queen Vashti and born as Vashti Ruth Cromwell in Lyons, New York, she was raised in nearby Rochester, New York. Although baptized a Lutheran Christian, she was not raised in any religion and her father later became an atheist. She attended Cornell University on a full tuition scholarship until the stock market crash and deepening economic depression depleted the scholarship fund and forced her to withdraw from Cornell. She later transferred to the University of Illinois.

== Family ==
She met her husband-to-be, John Paschal McCollum, at Champaign-Urbana, and the couple married in 1933. The McCollums had three children: James, Dannel, and Errol. Dannel McCollum later served as mayor of Champaign, Illinois and wrote a book about his mother's case.

== Activism ==
In 1944, James McCollum, then a fourth grader enrolled in the Champaign public schools, came home with a parental consent form for his attendance at "voluntary" religion classes during the school day. The form allowed choice between Catholic, Protestant, and Jewish instruction. The religious education program in the Champaign public schools had been established in 1940, and was based on a concept known as released time, which itself was adapted from the Gary plan, a Progressive Era educational concept that rotated students between academics, vocational training, and recreational activities. The released time concept allowed children to be released from public school to attend religious instruction at their house of worship. In the released time system in Champaign, a clergyman or layperson from each of the three represented religious faiths taught the religion classes in the public schools for 30 minutes each week.

With some reluctance, the McCollums allowed their eight-year-old son to attend the Champaign school district's Protestant religious course during his fourth grade year, but after reviewing the course materials, they withdrew permission for James's participation for the following year, based on their belief that the content of Champaign's religion classes was inappropriate for the public schools. James – the only student in his class not participating in the religion class – was subsequently pressured by his teachers to conform, and his parents were pressured by school officials to permit him to join the religion classes, with one teacher suggesting that "allowing him to take the religious education course might help him.to become a member of the group" and reduce his social isolation. The McCollums were angered at their son's ostracism by his teachers, which included James's being forced to sit alone in a hallway while the other pupils attended religion classes. After a meeting with school officials which failed to change the school district's policy, McCollum filed suit against Champaign's school district in July 1945.

== Lawsuit ==
McCollum's suit, Illinois ex rel. McCollum v. Board of Ed. of School Dist. No. 71, Champaign Cty., was filed in the 6th judicial circuit court and sought to bar the classes, which were taught by members of a private religious association and not public school employees. The petition before the court complained the school district's practice was a violation of the Establishment Clause of the First Amendment, which provides that the state will not establish or favor one religion over another religion, or disallow the practice of any religion, and also the Equal Protection Clause of the Fourteenth Amendment, which guarantees that the law will apply equally to all people.

On September 10, 1945, the opening argument by McCollum's attorney, Landon Chapman, suggested the program was sectarian and social pressure from students and teachers was used to get all students to participate. Defense attorney John Franklin indicated similar programs existed in 46 states and 80 Illinois communities. The Baptist Joint Committee submitted an amicus brief in support of McCollum, saying, "We must not allow our religious fervor to blind us to the essential fact that no religious faith is secure when it meshes its authority with that of the state."

On the first day of the trial, a Bible-carrying man is said to have approached the school board's attorney and announced that he was there to testify for the Lord. Franklin turned to him and replied, “The Lord, sir, is not on trial here today.” This quote was the source for the title of Dan McCollum's book on his mother's experience as well as the title of Jay Rosenstein's 2010 PBS documentary.

McCollum's father, Arthur Cromwell, testified in the original trial and elicited a gasp from the crowd when he said he did not believe in God. Both Cromwell and ten-year-old James McCollum "affirmed" that they would tell the truth in lieu of swearing by God. In another key testimony, Rev. Alva R Cartlidge, president of the Champaign school council for religious education, explained that the program had grown out of spontaneous demand caused by increasing juvenile delinquency.

The county circuit court ruled against McCollum and was subsequently upheld in fall 1946 by the Illinois Supreme Court upon appeal.

=== Impact on family ===
During the three-year legal battle, Mrs. McCollum received physical threats and was fired from her job as a dance instructor at the university. In one Halloween, a mob of trick-or-treaters pelted the McCollum family with rotten tomatoes and cabbages, which killed the family cat.

According to McCollum, most of her lawsuit's original cost of $25,000 was underwritten by the Chicago Action Council, although the family paid off $4,000 and $1,000 came from many private donations, ranging from 25 cents to $100.

== Appeal ==
On June 2, 1947, the Supreme Court agreed to hear the case, and arguments started December 8, 1947. Attorney Walter F. Dodd represented the plaintiff and John L. Franklin again served as counsel for the State of Illinois.

In an 8–1 decision announced on March 8, 1948 333 U.S. 203, the court reversed the ruling of the lower courts and held that the school district's religious instruction program was unconstitutional. A critical issue in the case was whether the constitutional ban on establishing religion meant that all sects must be treated equally, as lawyers for Champaign argued was the case in their schools, or whether it required strict neutrality between belief and unbelief, which was Mrs. McCollum's successful contention. "The First Amendment rests upon the premise that both religion and government can best work to achieve their lofty aims if each is left free from the other in its respective sphere," Justice Black wrote. The case was also important because it extended First Amendment protection to individual states by using the due process clause of the 14th Amendment as a justification. All other cases that have since tested and continue to test Thomas Jefferson's wall of "separation of church and state," including school prayer, aid to parochial schools and sectarian religious displays on public property descend from this case.

== External references ==
- Champaign woman who won high court ruling dead at 93, obituary from the Champaign News-Gazette online edition, August 21, 2006
- McCollum, Vashti (1953). One Woman's Fight. Freedom From Religion Foundation, Inc. ISBN 978-1-877733-08-6.
- Article on McCollum and her lawsuit from Church & State (magazine), Vol. 51, April 1998
- Dannel Angus McCollum Papers, including Vashti McCollum's scrapbooks
- PBS documentary The Lord is not on trial here today
- The Lord is Not on Trial Here Today: PBS
- New York Times Obituary of Vashti McCollum, August 26, 2006
