= Van Wert, Ohio =

- City
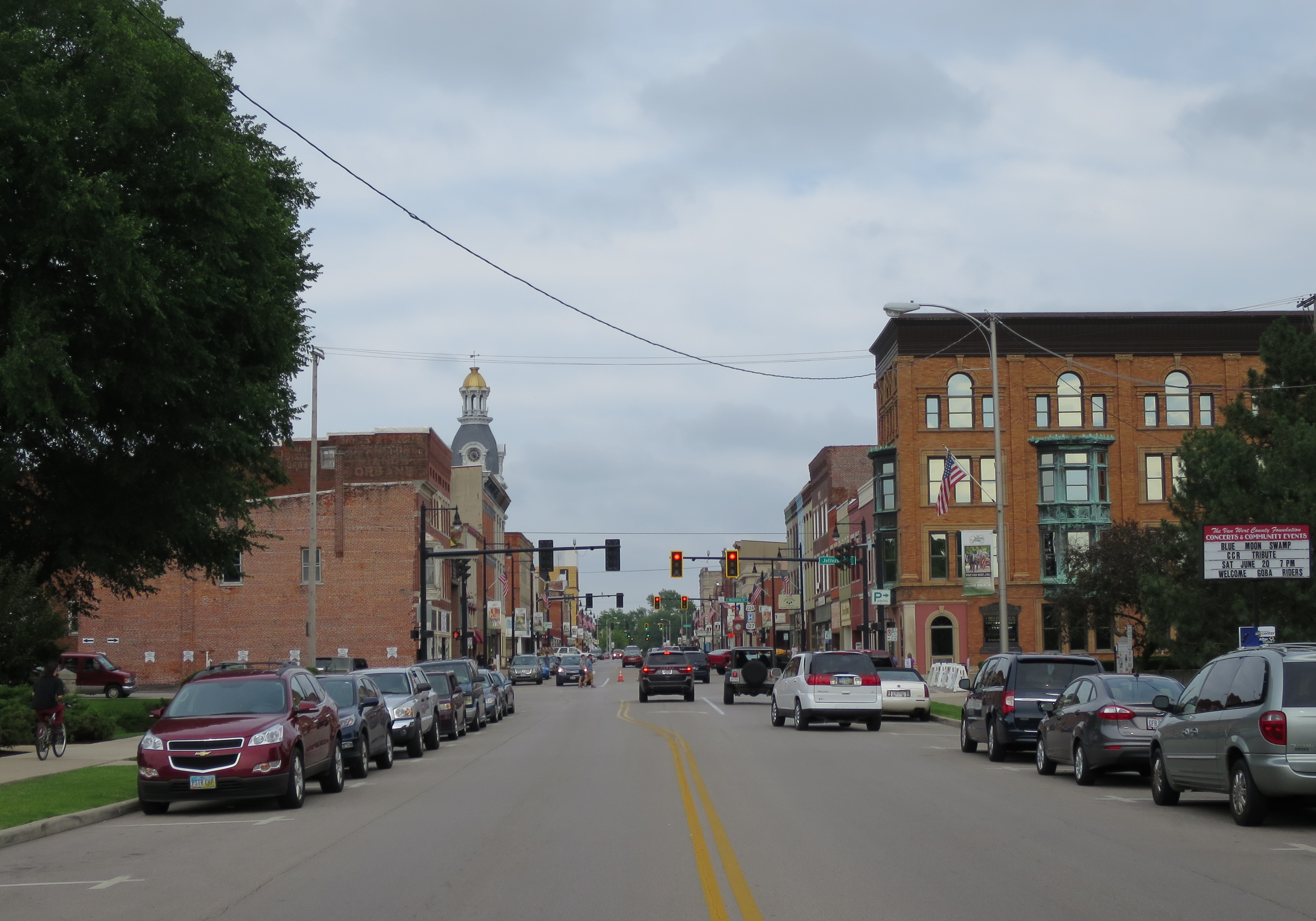
- Downtown Van Wert
- Interactive map of Van Wert, Ohio
- Location within Ohio Location within the United States
- Coordinates: 40°52′04″N 84°35′50″W
- Country: United States
- State: Ohio
- County: Van Wert
- Township: Pleasant, Ridge
- Incorporated (town): 1848
- Incorporated (city): 1903

Government
  - Mayor: Ken Markward

Area
  - Total: 7.81 sq mi (20.23 km^{2})
  - Land: 7.53 sq mi (19.50 km^{2})
  - Water: 0.28 sq mi (0.73 km^{2})
- Elevation: 778 ft (237 m)

Population (2020)
  - Total: 11,092
  - Density: 1,473.0/sq mi (568.74/km^{2})
- Time zone: UTC-5 (Eastern (EST))
  - Summer (DST): UTC-4 (EDT)
- ZIP code: 45891
- Area code: 419
- FIPS code: 39-79562
- GNIS feature ID: 2397117
- Website: www.vanwert.org

Van Wert is a city in Van Wert County, Ohio, United States, and its county seat. It is located in northwestern Ohio approximately 77 miles (124 km) southwest of Toledo and 34 miles (55 km) southeast of Fort Wayne, Indiana. The population was 11,092 at the 2020 census. It is the principal city of the Van Wert micropolitan area, which is included in the Lima–Van Wert–Wapakoneta combined statistical area.

Van Wert is named for Isaac Van Wart, one of the captors of Major John André in the American Revolutionary War. A center of peony cultivation, Van Wert has hosted the annual Van Wert Peony Festival on and off since 1902. Van Wert is home to the first county library in the United States, the Brumback Library.

== History ==
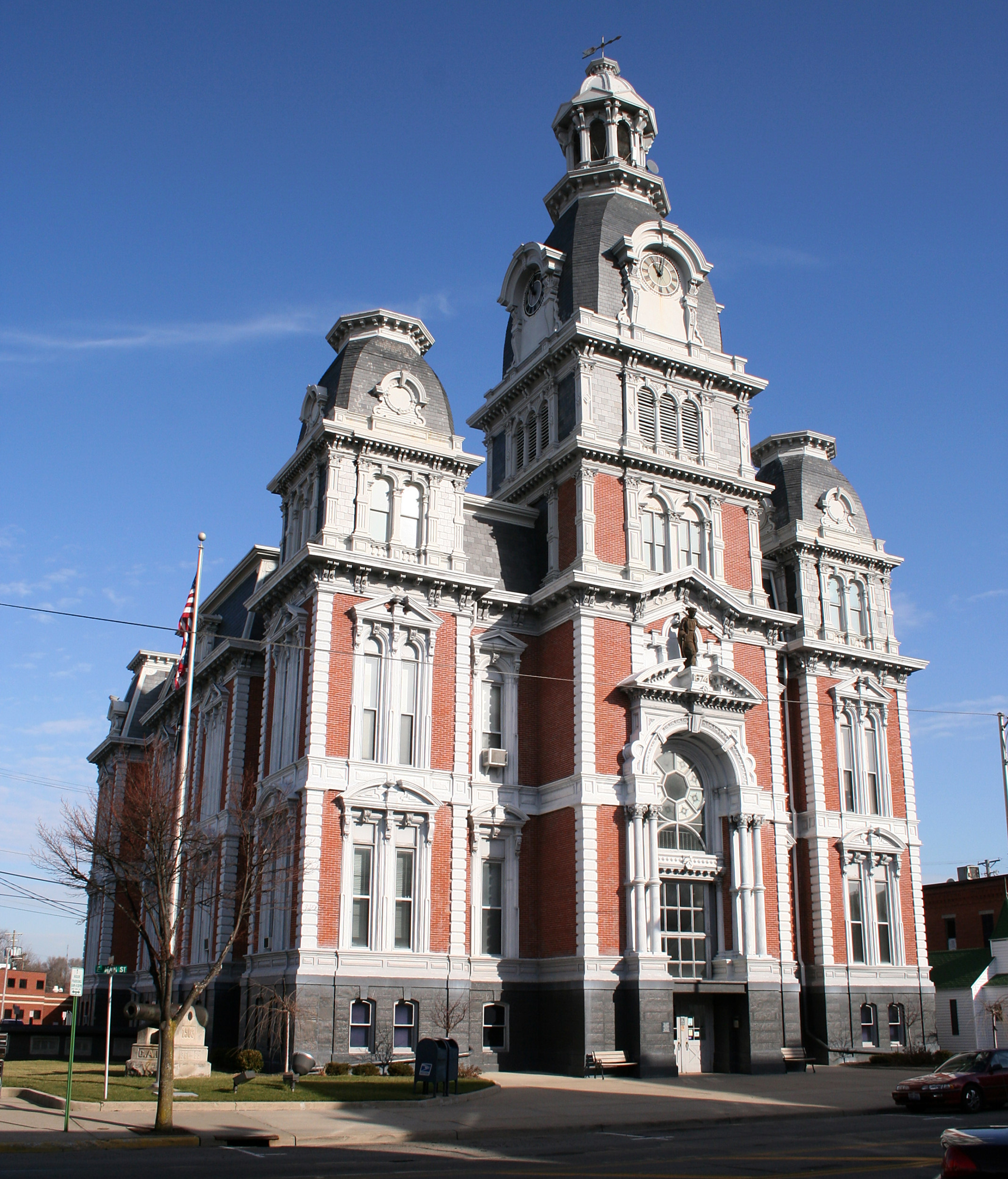
Van Wert County Courthouse (built 1874–1876) is listed on the National Register of Historic Places.

Van Wert was surveyed in 1824 by Captain James Riley, who was contracted by the government to survey lands purchased from Native Americans under a treaty in 1818. It was incorporated as a town in 1848 and was chartered as a city in 1903.

The town is located in an area originally known as the Black Swamp. Early pioneers had to deal with swampy ground, mud, and malaria. They persevered, draining the swamp for agriculture and eventually reclaiming enough dry land to establish the town. Van Wert was the birthplace of aviation pioneer Walter Hinton and the famous baritone Charles W. Clark.

At one point, Van Wert was the only place in the world producing Liederkranz cheese. Beginning in 1926, this pungent dairy product was manufactured at the now-closed Borden plant. At the time of the closure, Liederkranz cheese was selling for $8 per pound. The people of Van Wert (400 of which called themselves "Cheesemakers") contributed to the town of Vimoutiers, Orne, Lower Normandy, France with help in the costs of reconstruction and reparation of the town after it was mistakenly bombed by the US Air Force during World War II. They volunteered to pay for the replacement of Marie Harel's statue in 1953. This is recorded by a plaque in the market square of Vimoutiers. Vimoutiers is a centre for local making of Camembert, Livarot and Pont-l'Évêque cheeses.

On November 10, 2002, an F4 tornado struck the town, killing two people. This was one of many tornado touchdowns during the 2002 Veterans Day Weekend tornado outbreak. Van Wert's emergency warning system is credited with saving many lives after several cars were thrown into a movie theatre that had been packed with people just minutes earlier.

== Geography ==
According to the United States Census Bureau, the city has a total area of 7.61 square miles (19.71 km^{2}), of which 7.33 square miles (18.98 km^{2}) is land and 0.28 square miles (0.73 km^{2}) is water.

=== Climate ===
Climate data for Van Wert, Ohio (1991–2020 normals, extremes 1893–1903, 1924–present)
| Month | Jan | Feb | Mar | Apr | May | Jun | Jul | Aug | Sep | Oct | Nov | Dec | Year |
|---|---|---|---|---|---|---|---|---|---|---|---|---|---|
| Record high °F (°C) | 71 (22) | 74 (23) | 86 (30) | 90 (32) | 100 (38) | 104 (40) | 110 (43) | 103 (39) | 105 (41) | 93 (34) | 79 (26) | 71 (22) | 110 (43) |
| Mean maximum °F (°C) | 55.3 (12.9) | 58.7 (14.8) | 69.8 (21.0) | 80.2 (26.8) | 88.3 (31.3) | 93.6 (34.2) | 93.7 (34.3) | 92.4 (33.6) | 90.3 (32.4) | 82.9 (28.3) | 68.7 (20.4) | 58.5 (14.7) | 95.5 (35.3) |
| Mean daily maximum °F (°C) | 32.5 (0.3) | 36.1 (2.3) | 46.9 (8.3) | 60.3 (15.7) | 71.8 (22.1) | 80.9 (27.2) | 84.5 (29.2) | 82.6 (28.1) | 76.8 (24.9) | 63.9 (17.7) | 49.5 (9.7) | 37.4 (3.0) | 60.3 (15.7) |
| Daily mean °F (°C) | 25.3 (−3.7) | 28.3 (−2.1) | 37.9 (3.3) | 49.8 (9.9) | 61.6 (16.4) | 71.0 (21.7) | 74.5 (23.6) | 72.4 (22.4) | 65.8 (18.8) | 53.7 (12.1) | 41.3 (5.2) | 30.8 (−0.7) | 51.0 (10.6) |
| Mean daily minimum °F (°C) | 18.2 (−7.7) | 20.5 (−6.4) | 28.9 (−1.7) | 39.3 (4.1) | 51.4 (10.8) | 61.1 (16.2) | 64.4 (18.0) | 62.3 (16.8) | 54.7 (12.6) | 43.4 (6.3) | 33.0 (0.6) | 24.1 (−4.4) | 41.8 (5.4) |
| Mean minimum °F (°C) | −2.8 (−19.3) | 1.7 (−16.8) | 11.5 (−11.4) | 24.7 (−4.1) | 36.6 (2.6) | 47.4 (8.6) | 53.5 (11.9) | 51.5 (10.8) | 41.2 (5.1) | 29.9 (−1.2) | 18.6 (−7.4) | 6.5 (−14.2) | −5.8 (−21.0) |
| Record low °F (°C) | −24 (−31) | −18 (−28) | −15 (−26) | 9 (−13) | 22 (−6) | 35 (2) | 41 (5) | 37 (3) | 25 (−4) | 12 (−11) | −2 (−19) | −18 (−28) | −24 (−31) |
| Average precipitation inches (mm) | 2.57 (65) | 2.05 (52) | 2.52 (64) | 3.59 (91) | 4.76 (121) | 4.59 (117) | 4.66 (118) | 3.95 (100) | 3.15 (80) | 2.99 (76) | 2.94 (75) | 2.59 (66) | 40.36 (1,025) |
| Average snowfall inches (cm) | 6.2 (16) | 4.5 (11) | 2.5 (6.4) | 0.4 (1.0) | 0.0 (0.0) | 0.0 (0.0) | 0.0 (0.0) | 0.0 (0.0) | 0.0 (0.0) | 0.0 (0.0) | 0.6 (1.5) | 2.9 (7.4) | 17.1 (43) |
| Average precipitation days (≥ 0.01 in) | 9.1 | 7.8 | 8.6 | 10.6 | 11.0 | 10.0 | 8.1 | 7.2 | 7.2 | 8.6 | 8.7 | 8.8 | 105.7 |
| Average snowy days (≥ 0.1 in) | 3.1 | 2.8 | 1.1 | 0.2 | 0.0 | 0.0 | 0.0 | 0.0 | 0.0 | 0.1 | 0.3 | 2.0 | 9.6 |
Source: NOAA

== Demographics ==
Historical population
| Census | Pop. | Note | %± |
|---|---|---|---|
| 1850 | 268 | | — |
| 1860 | 1,615 | | 502.6% |
| 1870 | 2,625 | | 62.5% |
| 1880 | 4,079 | | 55.4% |
| 1890 | 5,512 | | 35.1% |
| 1900 | 6,422 | | 16.5% |
| 1910 | 7,157 | | 11.4% |
| 1920 | 8,100 | | 13.2% |
| 1930 | 8,472 | | 4.6% |
| 1940 | 9,227 | | 8.9% |
| 1950 | 10,354 | | 12.2% |
| 1960 | 11,323 | | 9.4% |
| 1970 | 11,320 | | 0.0% |
| 1980 | 11,022 | | −2.6% |
| 1990 | 10,891 | | −1.2% |
| 2000 | 10,690 | | −1.8% |
| 2010 | 10,846 | | 1.5% |
| 2020 | 11,092 | | 2.3% |

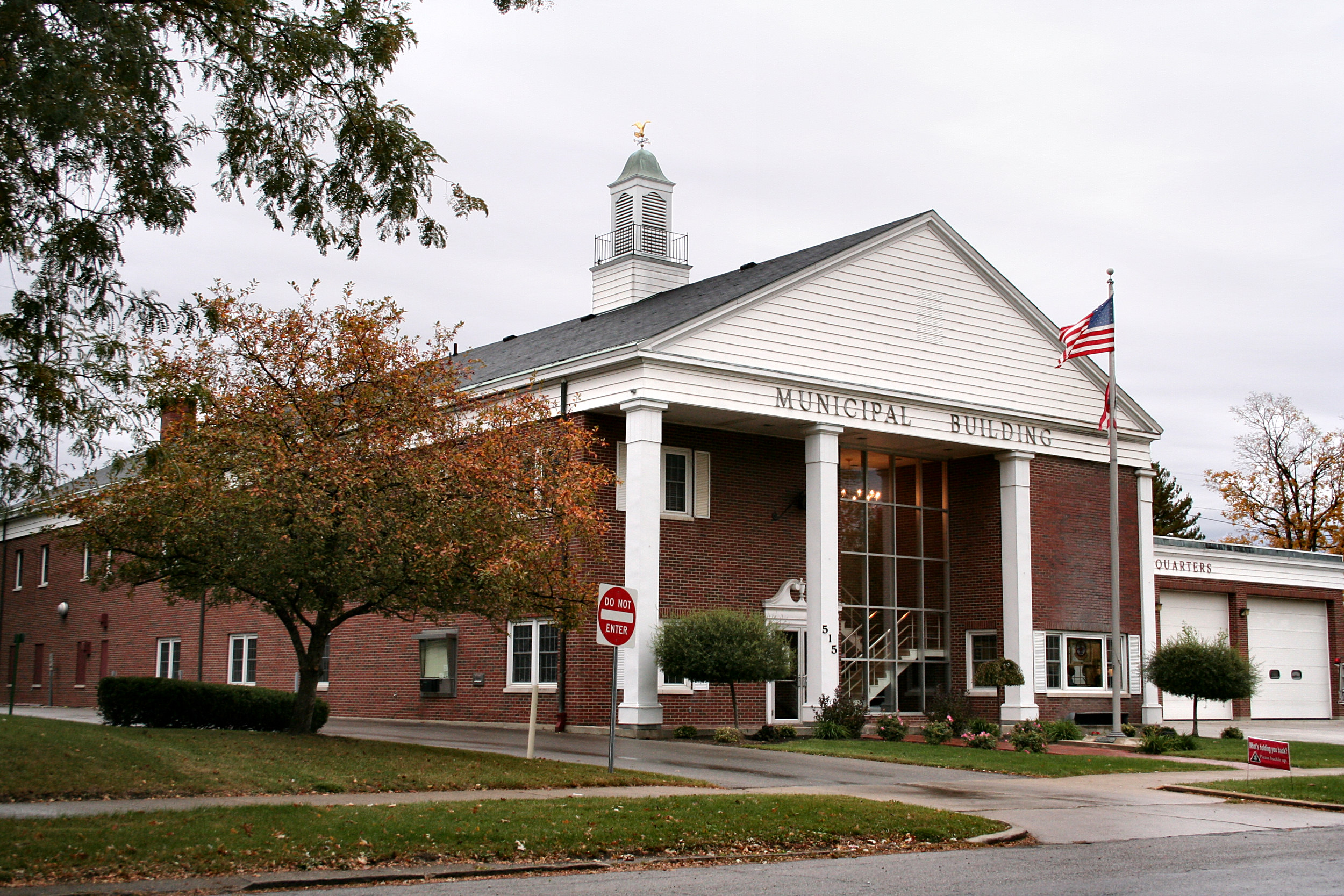
Van Wert Municipal Building

=== 2020 census ===
As of the 2020 census, Van Wert had a population of 11,092. The median age was 40.5 years. 23.0% of residents were under the age of 18 and 21.4% of residents were 65 years of age or older. For every 100 females there were 91.1 males, and for every 100 females age 18 and over there were 86.5 males age 18 and over.

98.2% of residents lived in urban areas, while 1.8% lived in rural areas.

There were 4,653 households in Van Wert, of which 27.5% had children under the age of 18 living in them. Of all households, 40.8% were married-couple households, 18.7% were households with a male householder and no spouse or partner present, and 31.5% were households with a female householder and no spouse or partner present. About 34.3% of all households were made up of individuals and 16.3% had someone living alone who was 65 years of age or older.

There were 5,080 housing units, of which 8.4% were vacant. The homeowner vacancy rate was 2.4% and the rental vacancy rate was 9.3%.

Racial composition as of the 2020 census
| Race | Number | Percent |
|---|---|---|
| White | 9,968 | 89.9% |
| Black or African American | 187 | 1.7% |
| American Indian and Alaska Native | 34 | 0.3% |
| Asian | 50 | 0.5% |
| Native Hawaiian and Other Pacific Islander | 12 | 0.1% |
| Some other race | 247 | 2.2% |
| Two or more races | 594 | 5.4% |
| Hispanic or Latino (of any race) | 597 | 5.4% |

=== 2010 census ===
As of the census of 2010, there were 10,846 people, 4,536 households, and 2,812 families residing in the city. The population density was 1,479.7 inhabitants per square mile (571.3/km^{2}). There were 5,111 housing units at an average density of 697.3 per square mile (269.2/km^{2}). The racial makeup of the city was 94.6% White, 1.7% African American, 0.1% Native American, 0.4% Asian, 1.2% from other races, and 2.0% from two or more races. Hispanic or Latino of any race were 4.0% of the population.

There were 4,536 households, of which 29.4% had children under the age of 18 living with them, 44.6% were married couples living together, 12.6% had a female householder with no husband present, 4.7% had a male householder with no wife present, and 38.0% were non-families. 33.6% of all households were made up of individuals, and 15.9% had someone living alone who was 65 years of age or older. The average household size was 2.33 and the average family size was 2.93.

The median age in the city was 39.6 years. 24.4% of residents were under the age of 18; 8.2% were between the ages of 18 and 24; 23.1% were from 25 to 44; 26.2% were from 45 to 64; and 18.1% were 65 years of age or older. The gender makeup of the city was 46.8% male and 53.2% female.

=== 2000 census ===
As of the census of 2000, there were 10,690 people, 4,556 households, and 2,947 families residing in the city. The population density was 1,803.8 inhabitants per square mile (696.5/km^{2}). There were 4,927 housing units at an average density of 831.4 per square mile (321.0/km^{2}). The racial makeup of the city was 96.07% White, 1.50% African American, 0.11% Native American, 0.35% Asian, 1.09% from other races, and 0.89% from two or more races. Hispanic or Latino of any race were 2.25% of the population.

There were 4,556 households, out of which 29.3% had children under the age of 18 living with them, 50.1% were married couples living together, 10.7% had a female householder with no husband present, and 35.3% were non-families. 31.0% of all households were made up of individuals, and 14.0% had someone living alone who was 65 years of age or older. The average household size was 2.31 and the average family size was 2.88.

In the city, the population was spread out, with 24.1% under the age of 18, 9.3% from 18 to 24, 26.7% from 25 to 44, 22.2% from 45 to 64, and 17.7% who were 65 years of age or older. The median age was 38 years. For every 100 females, there were 88.8 males. For every 100 females age 18 and over, there were 86.1 males.

The median income for a household in the city was $33,205, and the median income for a family was $41,711. Males had a median income of $31,441 versus $23,143 for females. The per capita income for the city was $17,413. About 5.0% of families and 7.1% of the population were below the poverty line, including 7.4% of those under age 18 and 7.9% of those age 65 or over.

== Education ==
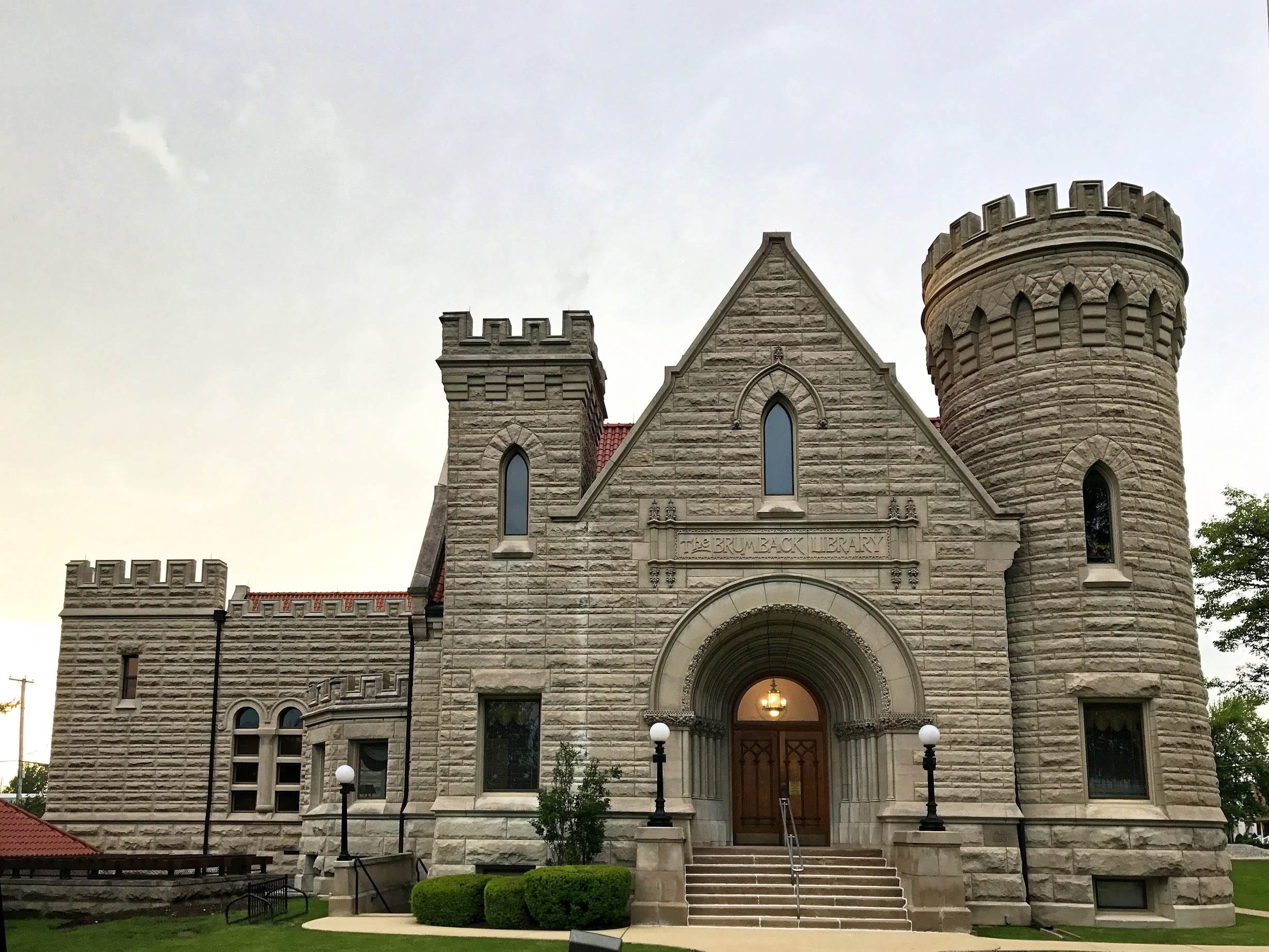
Brumback Library, established in 1901

Van Wert City Schools enrolls 2,027 students in public primary and secondary schools. The district operates 5 public schools including the Early Childhood Center (Pre-school–kindergarten), Van Wert Elementary School (grades 1–5), Van Wert Middle School (grades 6–8), Van Wert High School (grades 9–12), and Vantage Career Center (grades 11–12), along with the Goedde Building as the Central Administrative Offices. Van Wert High School sports participate in the Western Buckeye League, an athletic body sanctioned by the Ohio High School Athletic Association (OHSAA).

The main branch of the Brumback Library is located in Van Wert.

== See also ==
- WERT
