= Ayersville, Ohio =

Unincorporated community in Ohio, U.S.

Coordinates: 41°14′19″N 84°17′08″W

Ayersville is an unincorporated community in Defiance County, in the U.S. state of Ohio.

== History ==
A post office was established at Ayersville in 1850, and remained in operation until 1905. The community was named for Joseph Ayers.

== Education ==
Ayersville High School is part of Ayersville Local School District.

There are many school activities students can participate in such as band, choir, sports, etc. There is the Ayersville Elementary, Middle, and High School. The Ayersville Local School District rebuilt their school in 2017.
