= Released time =

Out-of-school religious education for public school students

In the United States public school system, released time or release time is time set aside during school hours, typically an hour a day or a week, for students to voluntarily receive off-campus private religious education. There were challenges, but the concept was upheld and a defined implementation resulted, blocking hostility to religious instruction for these students whose parents approved, permitting accommodation yet precluded public funding.

== Early history ==
The original idea of released time in the United States was first discussed in 1905 at a school conference in New York City. The proposal was that public elementary schools should be closed one day a week, in addition to Sunday, so that parents could have their children receive religious instruction outside the school premises. This idea was later implemented by Dr. William Albert Wirt, an educator and superintendent of the school district of Gary, Indiana, in 1914. In the first years of Wirt's implementation, over 600 students participated in off-campus religious education.

Most released time programs were held outside school property, and the public school system had no involvement in the religious programs taught there.

Released time began to grow rapidly. In 1922, programs were active in 23 states. Approximately 40,000 students, from 200 school districts, were enrolled in such programs. In 1932, 30 states had active programs in 400 communities with enrollment of 250,000 students. In 1942, participation reached 1.5 million students in 46 states. Released time reached its peak enrollment totals in 1947, when 2 million students were enrolled in some 2,200 communities. Legislation paving the way for released time programs had been adopted by 12 states.

== Legal challenge ==
In 1945, Vashti McCollum brought legal action against the Champaign, Illinois public school district. McCollum was the mother of a student in the district. McCollum's suit stated that her eight-year-old son had been coerced and ostracized by school officials because her family had chosen to not participate in the district's in-school religious instruction program. The Champaign district's religious instruction was held during regular school hours in the classrooms in Champaign's public schools and was taught by members of a local religious association, with the approval of school officials.

McCollum's suit argued that religious instruction held during regular school hours on public school property constituted an establishment of religion, in violation of the US Constitution, and violated also the Equal Protection Clause of the Fourteenth Amendment.

The state district court ruled against McCollum, as did the Illinois Supreme Court upon appeal. However, in 1948, the United States Supreme Court ruled 8-1 in favor of McCollum, reversing the lower courts' decision. It ruled that the Champaign program was unconstitutional since it used the state's compulsory education system to aid in the teaching of religious doctrine and tax-supported school buildings were being used.

In the aftermath of that decision, McCollum v. Board of Education, the number of released time classes dropped by 12 percent across the nation.

=== Zorach v. Clauson ===
In 1952, the case of Zorach v. Clauson came before the Supreme Court. The case involved the education law of New York State, particularly a regulation by which a public school was permitted to release students during school hours for religious instruction or devotional exercises. In a 6 to 3 ruling, the high court upheld the New York law.

In the majority opinion, Justice William O. Douglas wrote that New York's program "involves neither religious instruction in public schools nor the expenditure of public funds", unlike the earlier McCollum case that the Zorach plaintiffs had cited as precedent.

Douglas wrote that a public school "may not coerce anyone to attend church, to observe a religious holiday, or to take religious instruction. But it can close its doors or suspend its operations as to those who want to repair to their religious sanctuary for worship or instruction. No more than that is undertaken here."

The Court's opinion stated that

In the McCollum case the classrooms were used for religious instruction and the force of the public school was used to promote that instruction. Here, as we have said, the public schools do no more than accommodate their schedules to a program of outside religious instruction. We follow the McCollum case. But we cannot expand it to cover the present released time program unless separation of Church and State means that public institutions can make no adjustments of their schedules to accommodate the religious needs of the people. We cannot read into the Bill of Rights such a philosophy of hostility to religion.

=== Moss v. Spartanburg County School District Seven ===
In 2012, the U.S. Court of Appeals for the Fourth Circuit upheld a South Carolina school district’s practice of awarding academic credit through a religiously-affiliated private school in the case of Moss v. Spartanburg County School District Seven. The court reiterating that Zorach is good law and held that Released Time programs, and the academic credit received for them, is an accommodation of the parents’ right to choose the type of education their child receives. The court found that:

Far from establishing a state religion, the acceptance of transfer credits (including religious credits) by public schools sensibly accommodates the genuine choice among options public and private, secular and religious.

== Today ==
There are approximately 1,000 released time programs in operation today, ranging from kindergarten to high school, with 250,000 students enrolled. In some areas, including most public school districts in the state of Utah, released time programs allow students a daily class period, which may be used for extracurricular religious studies.

=== Christian education programs ===
A multi-denominational Christian organization that supports Released Time Bible Education across the country is School Ministries, Inc. It was created in 1990 to act as an association that assists local communities in the creation of Released Time Bible Education and to provide support for existing programs. Although initially envisioned to have a South Carolina focus, School Ministries soon was undertaking a national role in responding to RTBE interests, addressing legal challenges, raising national visibility and addressing research needs. Since 2003, School Ministries has growth annually at an increase of 10% in students served.

In 2006, School Ministries lead an effort in South Carolina to allow Released Time for high school credit. This law is now referred to as the Released Time Credit Act. School Ministries followed this up in 2014 in the state of Ohio. Since that time additional states have allowed schools to award academic credit for Released Time including three by legislative action (Alabama, Tennessee, and Indiana) and one by administrative law (Utah).

Founded in 2018 in Ohio as a Christian interdenominational release time program, LifeWise Academy

=== Latter-day Saint education programs ===
One notable large group taking released time for religious instruction are Latter-day Saint students. Most LDS students in ninth through twelfth grade attend weekday religious classes called Seminary. In the Western United States, such as in Idaho and Utah, it is common to find an LDS seminary building within close walking distance of public high schools, sometimes directly adjacent. In such situations, the LDS students will take one class period off from the public school as released time. The large numbers taking released time means the seminary has up to six or seven periods corresponding to the public school class periods.

=== Jewish education programs ===
New York City also participates in released time Many organizations take advantage, notably, the Jewish Education Program and the Jewish Released Time Program of Greater New York.

Supporters of released time programs interpret the various court cases as permitting these programs, provided several guidelines are met:

- Classes must not be held on public school property.
- Religious instruction may not be financed by public funds.
- Students must have parental permission to be released from public school for attending religious instruction.

Since 1941 "1,000,000 Public School Children have participated in the Jewish Hour" implementation of Released-time.

A 1970s participant "from PS xxx in Brooklyn (walked) to a synagogue down the block" described it as "They lit the candles with us on Chanukah, told us stories, brought us matzoh for Passover... On Sukkot the children munched on snacks inside a sukkah."

As of 2018 there were 1,328 participating students coming from 90 New York City public schools.

== See also ==
- McCollum v. Board of Education
- Separation of church and state
- Vashti McCollum
- Zorach v. Clauson

== References and further reading ==
- School Ministries - Home
- Releasedtime.org
- The "Release Time Program" Historical Album
- Article about released time, appeared in the Milwaukee Journal Sentinel on June 9, 2000
- The Supreme Court decision in the 1948 case of McCollum v. Board of Education, 333 U.S. 203
- The Supreme Court decision in the 1952 case of Zorach v. Clauson 343 U.S. 306
- Released Time Program of Greater New York
