= McCollum v. Board of Education =

- Supreme Court of the United States

Argued December 8, 1947 Decided March 8, 1948
- Full case name: People of State of Illinois ex rel. Vashti McCollum v. Board of Education of School District № 71, Champaign County, Illinois, et al.
- Citations: 333 U.S. 203 (more) 68 S. Ct. 461; 92 L. Ed. 2d 649; 1948 U.S. LEXIS 2451

Case history
- Prior: People ex rel. McCollum v. Bd. of Ed. of Sch. Dist. No. 71, 396 Ill. 14, 71 N.E.2d 161 (1947); probable jurisdiction noted, 67 S. Ct. 1524 (1947).

Holding
- The use of public school facilities by religious organizations to give religious instruction to school children violates the Establishment Clause of the First Amendment.

Court membership
- Chief Justice Fred M. Vinson Associate Justices Hugo Black · Stanley F. Reed; Felix Frankfurter · William O. Douglas; Frank Murphy · Robert H. Jackson; Wiley B. Rutledge · Harold H. Burton

Case opinions
- Majority: Black, joined by Vinson, Douglas, Murphy, Rutledge, Burton
- Concurrence: Frankfurter, joined by Jackson, Rutledge, Burton
- Concurrence: Jackson
- Dissent: Reed

Laws applied
- U.S. Const., Amends. I and XIV

McCollum v. Board of Education, 333 U.S. 203 (1948), is a landmark United States Supreme Court case related to the power of a state to use its tax-supported public school system to aid religious instruction. The case was a test of the separation of church and state with respect to education.

The case tested the principle of "released time" in which public schools set aside class time for religious instruction. The Court struck down a Champaign, Illinois, program as unconstitutional because of the public school system's involvement in the administration, organization, and support of religious instruction classes. The Court noted that some 2,000 communities nationwide offered similar released time programs affecting 1.5 million students.

== Background ==
The case was brought by Vashti McCollum, the mother of a student enrolled in the Champaign public school district.

In 1940, interested members of the Protestant, Catholic, and Jewish faiths formed an association named the Champaign Council on Religious Education. The association obtained permission from the Champaign Board of Education to offer voluntary religious education classes for public school students from grades four to nine. The weekly 30- and 45-minute classes were led by clergy and lay members of the association in public school classrooms during school hours.

McCollum, an atheist, objected to the existing religious classes and stated that her son James was ostracized for not attending them. After complaints to school officials to stop offering these classes went unheeded, McCollum sued the school board in July 1945, stating that the religious instruction in the public schools violated the Establishment Clause of the First Amendment and the principle of separation of church and state in the United States. McCollum also complained that the school district's religious education classes violated the Equal Protection Clause of the Fourteenth Amendment. The principal elements of the McCollum complaint were that:

- In actual practice, certain Protestant groups exercised an advantage over other Protestant denominations.
- The school district's calling the classes "voluntary" was in name only because school officials often coerced or forced students' participation.
- The power exercised by the Champaign Council on Religious Education in its selection of instructors and the school superintendent's oversight of these instructors served to determine which religious faiths participated in the instructional program and constituted prior censorship of religion.

In her suit, McCollum asked that the Board of Education be ordered to "adopt and enforce rules and regulations prohibiting all instruction in and teaching of all religious education in all public schools in Champaign District Number 71, and in all public school houses and buildings in said district when occupied by public schools."

The Circuit Court of Champaign County ruled in favor of the school district in January 1946, and upon appeal, the Illinois Supreme Court affirmed the lower court's ruling.

== Decision of the Court ==
McCollum sought review from the U.S. Supreme Court, which took the case and heard oral arguments in December 1947. A number of religious groups, including the American Unitarian Association, the Synagogue Council of America, the General Conference of Seventh-day Adventists and the Baptist Joint Committee of Religious Liberty, filed briefs in support of McCollum's position.

On March 8, 1948, the Court ruled 8-1 in favor of McCollum and ruled that the classes were unconstitutional.

In the majority opinion, written by Justice Hugo Black, the Court held:

[The facts] show the use of tax-supported property for religious instruction and the close cooperation between the school authorities and the religious council in promoting religious education. The operation of the state's compulsory education system thus assists and is integrated with the program of religious instruction carried on by separate religious sects. Pupils compelled by law to go to school for secular education are released... in part from their legal duty upon the condition that they attend the religious classes. To hold that a state cannot, consistently with the First and Fourteenth Amendments, utilize its public school system to aid any or all religious faiths or sects in the dissemination of their doctrines and ideals does not ... manifest a governmental hostility to religion or religious teachings.... For the First Amendment rests upon the premise that both religion and government can best work to achieve their lofty aims if each is left free from the other within its respective sphere.

=== Dissent ===
The lone dissenting justice, Stanley Forman Reed, objected to the breadth of the majority's interpretation of the Establishment Clause and stated that an incidental support of religion should have been permissible with a more narrow reading of the First Amendment.

== Subsequent developments ==
The Supreme Court remanded the case to the Illinois high court for relief consistent with the federal ruling.

The Court revisited the issue of religious instruction in Zorach v. Clauson in 1952. Its 6-3 ruling held that a New York State program allowing religious education during the school day was permissible because it did not use public school facilities or public funds.

== See also ==
- List of United States Supreme Court cases, volume 333
