= Zorach v. Clauson =

- Supreme Court of the United States

Argued January 31 – February 1, 1952 Decided April 28, 1952
- Full case name: Zorach, et al. v. Clauson, et al., constituting the Board of Education of the City of New York, et al.
- Citations: 343 U.S. 306 (more) 72 S. Ct. 679; 96 L. Ed. 954; 1952 U.S. LEXIS 2773

Case history
- Prior: 303 N.Y. 161, 100 N.E.2d 463 (1951); probable jurisdiction noted, 72 S. Ct. 232 (1951).

Holding
- Released time programs are acceptable if the instruction takes place away from the school campus, for 1 hour per week, and with no public funding.

Court membership
- Chief Justice Fred M. Vinson Associate Justices Hugo Black · Stanley F. Reed; Felix Frankfurter · William O. Douglas; Robert H. Jackson · Harold H. Burton; Tom C. Clark · Sherman Minton

Case opinions
- Majority: Douglas, joined by Vinson, Reed, Burton, Clark, Minton
- Dissent: Black
- Dissent: Frankfurter
- Dissent: Jackson

Laws applied
- U.S. Const. amend. I

Zorach v. Clauson, 343 U.S. 306 (1952), was a release time case in which the Supreme Court of the United States held that a school district allowing students to leave a public school for part of the day to receive off-site religious instruction did not violate the Establishment Clause of the First Amendment.

== Case ==
New York State law permitted schools to allow some students to leave school during school hours for purposes of religious instruction or practice while requiring others to stay in school. Accordingly, students in New York City were allowed to leave only on written request of their legal guardians, but the schools did not fund or otherwise assist in the development of these programs.

The Greater New York Coordinating Committee on Released Time of Jews, Protestants and Roman Catholics shared their attendance with the New York City Department of Education to prevent students from being truant, however. Several parents sued the district for providing official sanction for religious instruction.

== Supreme Court ==
=== Decision ===
The US Supreme Court upheld the arrangement by finding that it did not violate the Establishment Clause of the First Amendment or the Equal Protection Clause of the Fourteenth Amendment because the instruction was not held within the school building and received no public funds.

Justice William O. Douglas, writing for the majority, reasoned that "this 'released time' program involves neither religious instruction in public school classrooms nor the expenditure of public funds.... The case is therefore unlike McCollum v. Board of Education."

On the developing controversy of separation doctrine the Zorach majority said that the First Amendment did not require an absolute separation of Church and State where "the state and religion would be aliens to each other—hostile, suspicious and even unfriendly".

=== Dissents ===
Three justices dissented from the decision. Hugo Black, Felix Frankfurter and Robert H. Jackson considered the law unconstitutional, and all three cited McCollum v. Board of Education (1948) and believed that the Court did not adequately distinguish between the circumstances in McCollum and those in Zorach. Jackson's dissent was especially strong: "Today's judgment will be more interesting to students of psychology and of the judicial processes than to students of constitutional law."

== See also ==
- List of United States Supreme Court cases, volume 343
