= Ohio State Route 703 =

State highway in western Ohio, US

State Route 703

- SR 703 in Mercer and Auglaize counties

Route information
- Maintained by ODOT
- Length: 14.92 mi (24.01 km)
- Existed: 1937–present

Major junctions
- West end: SR 219 in Montezuma
- US 127 in Celina; SR 29 in Celina
- East end: SR 29 / SR 66 / SR 116 in St. Marys

Location
- Country: United States
- State: Ohio
- Counties: Mercer, Auglaize

Highway system
- Ohio State Highway System; Interstate; US; State; Scenic
← SR 702	→ SR 704

State Route 703 (SR 703) is a state highway in western Ohio. Its western terminus is in Montezuma at SR 219, its eastern terminus is in St. Marys at an intersection with SR 29, and SR 66, and the southern terminus of SR 116 in St. Marys. The route is mainly an east–west highway along the shores of Grand Lake St. Marys, although the section between Celina and Montezuma travels in a more north–south fashion.

In 1937, the route was designated from SR 219 to US 127, and fully paved by 1940. SR 703 was extended to the northern side of the Grand Lake in 1973, replacing an old alignment of SR 29.

== Route description ==
SR 703 travels through eastern Mercer County and the westernmost portion of Auglaize County. The busiest point in the route according to 2016 data was east of Lake Shore Drive in Celina, where the annual average daily traffic (AADT) was 16,775 vehicles. The least busy point was southeast of It's It Road, where the AADT was 1,826 vehicles.

The route starts at the intersection of SR 219 and South Canal Street in the village of Montezuma, and it travels north on North Canal Street. SR 703 turns northwest at a boat ramp to Wayne Street, and travels through a small area of farmland before intersecting US 127 at a Y-intersection. The concurrency, also known as South Main Street, continues along the western banks of Grand Lake St. Marys, passing by a lighthouse as it enters the town of Celina. The road then crosses an R.J. Corman railroad and intersects SR 29 at Logan Street, which also becomes concurrent with US 127 and SR 703 briefly. At Market Street, SR 703 and SR 29 begin traveling eastward, while US 127 continues northward and SR 197 begins its concurrency with US 127.

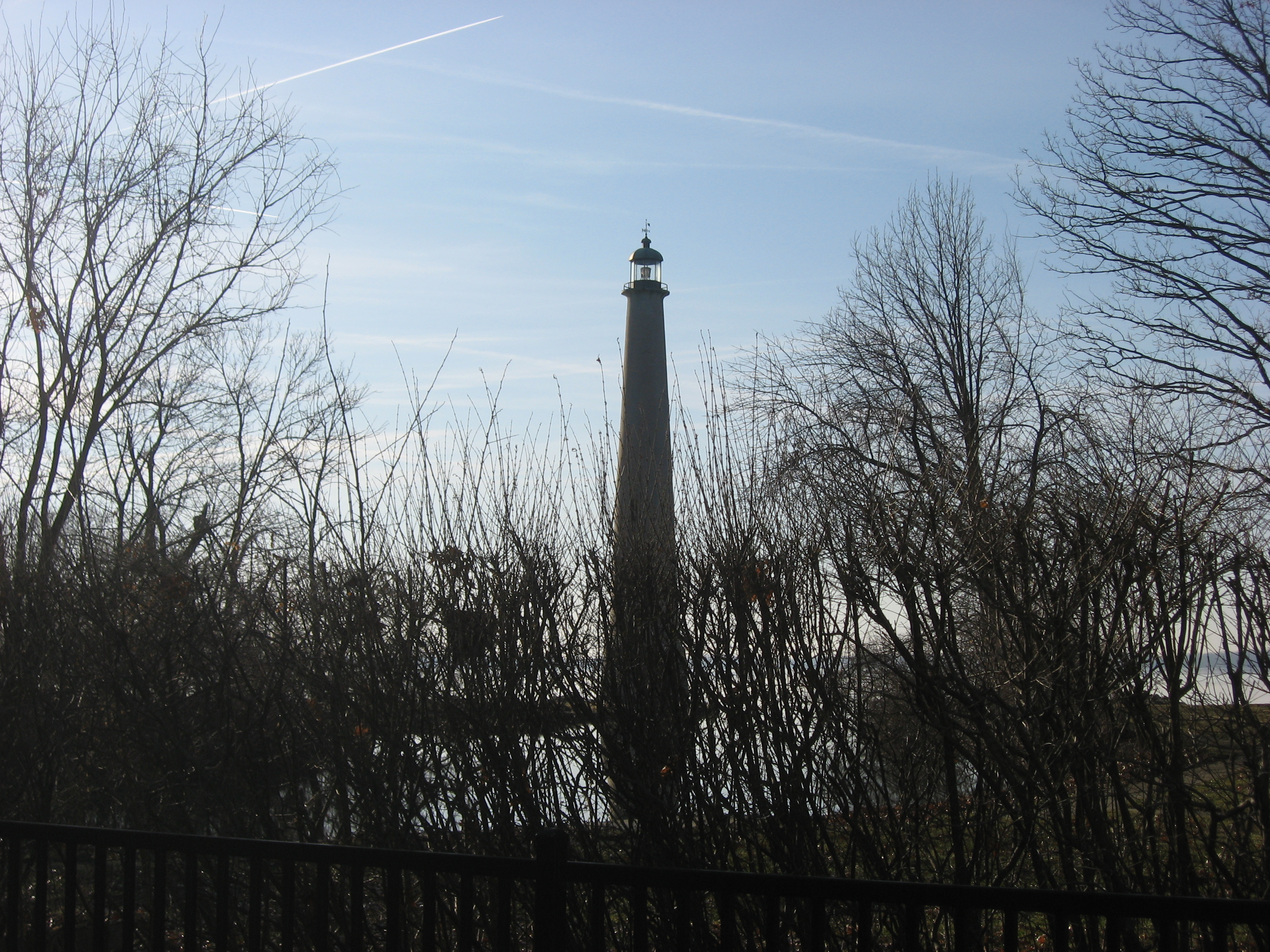
Grand Lake St. Marys Lighthouse, near SR 703

East Market Street crosses over a railroad as it leaves Celina. At Grand Lake Road, SR 703 turns south to continue as East Market Street, and SR 29 continues eastward to a divided highway. SR 703 then travels along the northern banks of the lake, with farmland north of the road. The road intersects multiple driveways and places, including the Wright State University Lake Campus and the Grand Lake St. Marys Lighthouse. Near Mercer–Auglaize County Line Road, the highway enters Auglaize County as Celina Road. The route intersects SR 364 at Koenig Road, which becomes concurrent with SR 703. The concurrency crosses a railroad, and SR 364 continues southward at East Bank Road. SR 703 enters St. Marys as Jackson Street, and travels toward the center of the city. The route turns southwards at North Wayne Street, then eastward at West Spring Street. At Main Street and Spring Street, SR 703 and SR 116 reach their termini at SR 29 and SR 66. SR 66 continues as South Main Street after this intersection, and SR 29 continues as East Spring Street.

== History ==
Around 1937, SR 703 was designated in Mercer County, from US 127 west of Montezuma to SR 219 near the Mercer–Auglaize county line. The road east of Montezuma was paved in gravel, and the section west of it was paved in asphalt. All of the route was paved in asphalt by 1940. A section near the western bank of the Grand Lake was added in 1953, both connecting to US 127. By 1972, SR 219 was rerouted northward, replacing SR 703 past Montezuma. Meanwhile, the section of SR 29 between Celina and St. Marys was moved to a newly built divided highway, and the SR 703 designation was added to the old alignment of SR 29. Six years later, SR 703 was rerouted onto US 127, and the old routing near the lake was removed.

== Major intersections ==
County	Location	mi	km	Destinations	Notes
Mercer	Montezuma	0.000	0.000	SR 219 (Main Street)	Western terminus
Mercer	Butler Township	1.448	2.330	US 127	Western end of US 127 concurrency
Mercer	Celina	4.816	7.751	SR 29 (West Logan Street)	Western end of SR 29 concurrency
Mercer	Celina	5.044	8.118	US 127 / SR 29 (East Market Street) / SR 29D (West Market Street) / SR 197	Eastern end of US 127 concurrency
Mercer	Celina	6.067	9.764	SR 29 (East Market Street)	Eastern end of SR 29 concurrency
Auglaize	Saint Marys Township	11.820	19.022	SR 364	Western end of SR 364 concurrency
Auglaize	Saint Marys Township	13.400	21.565	SR 364	Eastern end of SR 364 concurrency
Auglaize	St. Marys	14.920	24.011	SR 29 / SR 66 / SR 116 (North Main Street)	Eastern terminus
1.000 mi = 1.609 km; 1.000 km = 0.621 mi: Concurrency terminus

== See also ==
- Grand Lake St. Marys Seaplane Base
