= Ohio State Route 66 =

State highway in northwestern Ohio, US

State Route 66
- Route of SR 66 highlighted in red

Route information
- Maintained by ODOT
- Length: 118.60 mi (190.87 km)
- Existed: 1924–present

Major junctions
- South end: US 36 in Piqua
- US 33 in St. Marys; US 30 near Delphos; US 224 in Ottoville; US 24 near Defiance; US 6 near Evansport; I-80 / I-90 / Ohio Turnpike near Archbold
- North end: US 20 in Fayette

Location
- Country: United States
- State: Ohio
- Counties: Miami, Shelby, Auglaize, Allen, Van Wert, Putnam, Paulding, Defiance, Williams, Henry, Fulton

Highway system
- Ohio State Highway System; Interstate; US; State; Scenic
← SR 65	→ SR 67

State Route 66 (SR 66) is a north–south state highway in the northwestern portion of the U.S. state of Ohio. Its southern terminus is at U.S. Route 36 (US 36) in Piqua, and its northern terminus is at US 20 in Fayette. South of Defiance it generally follows the route of the former Miami and Erie Canal.

== Route description ==
The portion of SR 66 between Washington Avenue in Piqua and the Miami/Shelby County line is designated as the "Cpl. Samuel F. Pearson Memorial Highway", in honor of a Piqua High School graduate who was killed at Camp Victory in Baghdad, Iraq, while serving in the Army Reserve, on October 10, 2007.

== History ==
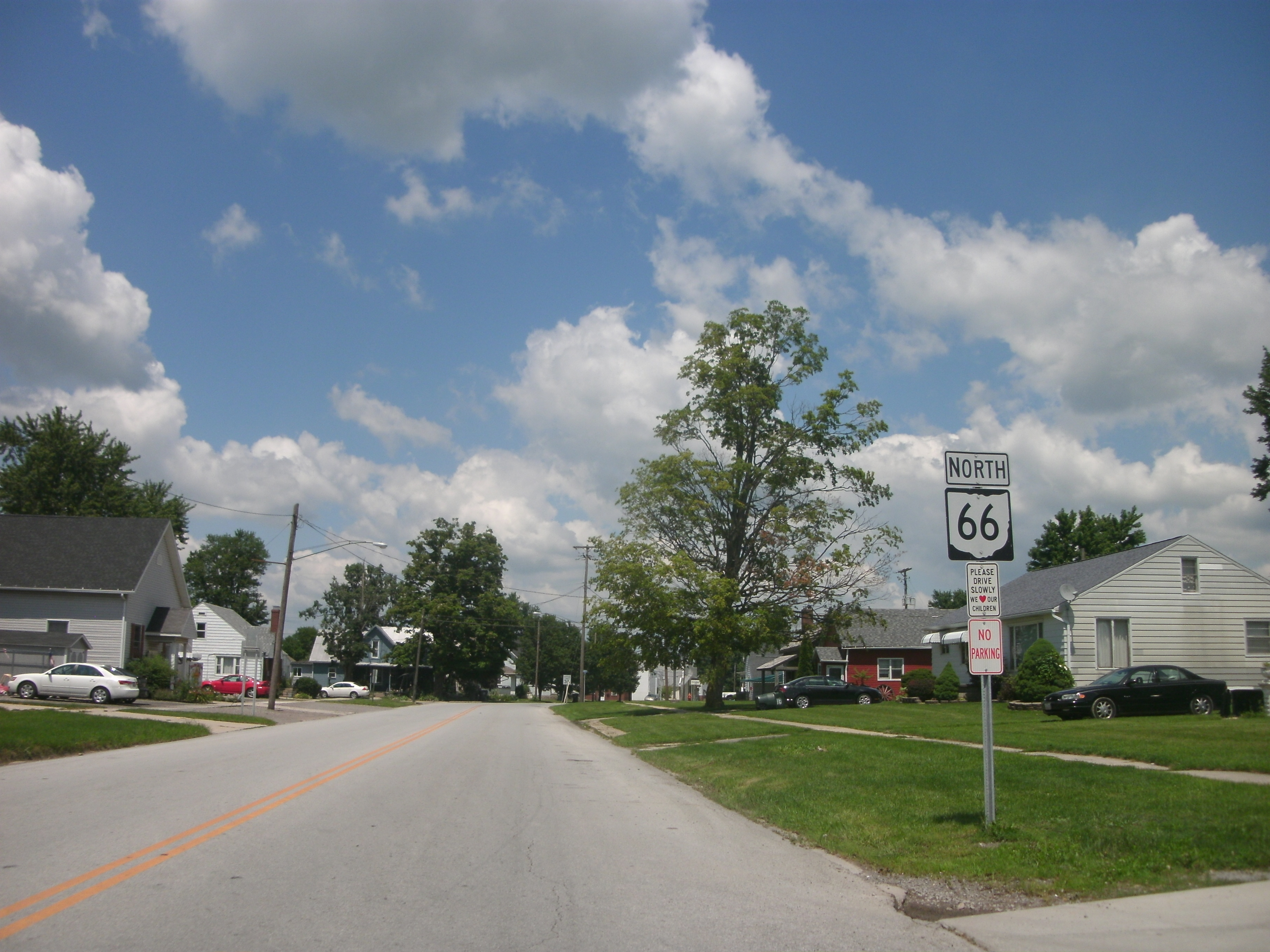
SR 66 through Spencerville

- 1924 – Original route established. Originally routed from Piqua to the Michigan state line 4 miles (6.4 km) north of Fayette.
- 1931 – Truncated at Fayette; U.S. Route 127 replaced the route’s alignment from Fayette to the Michigan state line.

== Major junctions ==
County	Location	mi	km	Destinations	Notes
Miami	Piqua	0.00	0.00	US 36	Southern terminus; road continues as US 36 west (Spring Street south)
Shelby	Loramie Township	10.78	17.35	SR 48 south – Russia, Covington	Northern terminus of SR 48
Shelby	Cynthian Township	12.44	20.02	SR 47 – Versailles, Sidney	
Shelby	Fort Loramie	16.68	26.84	SR 705 (Park Street)	
Shelby	Fort Loramie	16.80	27.04	SR 362 north (Elm Street) – Lake Loramie State Park	Southern terminus of SR 362
Auglaize	Minster	19.20	30.90	SR 362 south (First Street)	Northern terminus of SR 362
Auglaize	Minster	19.70	31.70	SR 119 east (Fourth Street)	Southern end of SR 119 concurrency
Auglaize	Minster	20.71	33.33	SR 119 west	Northern end of SR 119 concurrency
Auglaize	New Bremen	22.75	36.61	SR 274 (Monroe Street)	
Auglaize	Saint Marys Township	26.80	43.13	SR 219 – Montezuma, New Knoxville	
Auglaize	St. Marys	30.19	48.59	SR 29 west / SR 116 north (Main Street) / SR 703 west (Spring Street)	Southern end of SR 29 concurrency; southern terminus of SR 116; eastern terminus of SR 703
Auglaize	St. Marys	30.55	49.17	SR 29 east (Spring Street)	Northern end of SR 29 concurrency
Auglaize	Noble Township	31.34– 31.56	50.44– 50.79	US 33 to SR 29 – Columbus, Celina, Fort Wayne Ind.	Interchange
Auglaize	Salem Township	39.04	62.83	SR 197 – Celina, Kossuth, Buckland	
Allen	Spencerville	42.87	68.99	SR 117 (Fourth Street)	
Allen	Spencer–Amanda township line	44.97	72.37	SR 81 west – Willshire	Southern end of SR 81 concurrency
Allen	Amanda Township	45.21	72.76	SR 81 east – Lima	Northern end of SR 81 concurrency
Allen	Delphos	52.89	85.12	SR 697 west (Second Street)	Southern end of SR 697 concurrency
Allen	Delphos	53.12	85.49	SR 190 north (Fifth Street) / SR 697 ends	Northern end of SR 697 concurrency
Van Wert	Washington Township	55.38– 55.50	89.13– 89.32	US 30 – Van Wert, Mansfield	Interchange
Putnam	Ottoville	59.90	96.40	US 224 (Third Street) / SR 189 east	Southern end of US 224 concurrency; western terminus of SR 189
Putnam	Monterey Township	60.98	98.14	US 224 west – Van Wert	Northern end of US 224 concurrency
Paulding	Washington Township	67.10	107.99	SR 114 – Grover Hill, Cloverdale	
Paulding	Brown Township	73.17	117.76	SR 613 west – Melrose	Southern end of SR 613 concurrency
Paulding	Oakwood	73.39	118.11	SR 613 east (Walnut Street) – Continental	Northern end of SR 613 concurrency
Paulding	Auglaize Township	80.46	129.49	SR 637 south – Paulding	Northern terminus of SR 637
Defiance	Defiance	87.13	140.22	SR 66 Truck north (Downs Street)	Southern terminus of SR 66 Truck
Defiance	Defiance	88.10	141.78	SR 15 / SR 18 east (Second Street) – Mercy Hospital of Defiance	Southern end of SR 15/SR 18 concurrency
Defiance	Defiance	88.73	142.80	SR 111 south / SR 66 Truck south (Clinton Street) / West 2nd Street	Northern termini of SR 111 and SR 66 Truck
Defiance	Defiance	88.87	143.02	SR 15 / SR 18 west (Session Street)	Northern end of SR 15/SR 18 concurrency
Defiance	Defiance	89.67– 89.77	144.31– 144.47	US 24 – Napoleon, Antwerp	Interchange; exit 26 on US 24
Williams	Springfield Township	98.71	158.86	US 6 west – Edgerton	Southern end of US 6 concurrency
Henry	Ridgeville Township	101.85	163.91	US 6 east – Napoleon	Northern end of US 6 concurrency
Henry	Ridgeville Township	102.52	164.99	SR 34 – Napoleon, Bryan, Northwest State Community College	
Fulton	Archbold	107.35	172.76	SR 2 west (Stryker Street)	Southern end of SR 2 concurrency
Fulton	German Township	108.85	175.18	SR 2 east	Northern end of SR 2 concurrency
Fulton	German Township	110.85	178.40	US 20A east – Wauseon	Southern end of US 20A concurrency
Fulton	German Township	111.97	180.20	US 20A west – West Unity	Northern end of US 20A concurrency
Fulton	Franklin Township	112.71	181.39	I-80 / I-90 / Ohio Turnpike – Toledo, Chicago	Exit 25 on the Ohio Tpk.
Fulton	Fayette	118.60	190.87	US 20 (Main Street)	Northern terminus; road continues as Fayette Street
1.000 mi = 1.609 km; 1.000 km = 0.621 mi: Concurrency terminus; Tolled

== SR 66 Truck ==
State Route 66 Truck
- Location: Defiance, Ohio
- Length: 1.909 mi (3.072 km)

SR 66 Truck is a truck route which bypasses a low railroad bridge along SR 66 in southern Defiance. Beginning at a signalized intersection with South Jefferson Avenue (SR 66), it heads west on Downs Street through a residential neighborhood. At South Clinton Street, SR 111, SR 111 Truck becomes concurrent with SR 66 Truck and both head northwest along Deatrick Street passing a supermarket and three sets of railroad tracks at-grade. At Baltimore Street (former SR 424), the two truck routes turn northeast onto Holgate Avenue paralleling the Maumee River. After heading through a residential neighborhood of the city, the road bends to the east and transitions to West Third Street. After passing under a railroad bridge, it passes numerous businesses and city facilities before reaching SR 111 again at the intersection of Third Street and Clinton Street. While SR 111 Truck ends, SR 66 Truck continues on South Clinton Street with SR 111 for one block before ending at SR 15/SR 18/SR 66.
