= Ohio State Route 219 =

State highway in western Ohio, US

State Route 219

Route information
- Maintained by ODOT
- Length: 37.22 mi (59.90 km)
- Existed: 1925–present

Major junctions
- West end: Indiana State Line near Fort Recovery
- US 127 near Montezuma
- East end: I-75 in Botkins

Location
- Country: United States
- State: Ohio
- Counties: Mercer, Auglaize, Shelby

Highway system
- Ohio State Highway System; Interstate; US; State; Scenic
← SR 218	→ SR 220

State Route 219 (SR 219) is an east–west state highway in the western portion of the U.S. state of Ohio. State Route 219's western terminus is at the Indiana State Line approximately 5.5 miles (8.9 km) northwest of Fort Recovery, with the roadway continuing west into the Hoosier State being County Road 300N. The eastern terminus of State Route 219 is at a diamond interchange with Interstate 75 at its Exit 104 in Botkins.

== Route description ==
Along its path, State Route 219 traverses portions of Mercer, Auglaize and Shelby Counties. Outside of the towns, the route largely passes through agricultural areas mostly growing corn and soy. The majority of the route is a ground-level, two-line road with a speed limit of 55 mph that drops to 35 mph in towns and 25 mph in school zones, though those changes are often gradual. Speeding is discourage for safety and enforced by state and local police. Ohio is in the top-three of states with drivers that have a speeding ticket on record. Stop signs, traffic lights, rail intersections, bridge crossings, accidents, wildlife, and farm equipment may or other slow-moving vehicles may cause delays, but generally traffic moves pretty steadily. There are no parts of this state highway that are included within the National Highway System, a system of routes deemed most imperative for the nation's economy, mobility and defense.

== History ==
When it was first designated in 1925, SR 219 was routed between its current western terminus at the Indiana State Line and its junction with SR 66. In 1937, SR 219 was extended east to a new endpoint at what was US 25.

Following completion of Interstate 75 through northern Shelby County and southern Auglaize County in 1962, U.S. Route 25 was re-routed onto the new freeway, and SR 219 was extended. From its former eastern terminus, it was routed south along the former US 25 into Botkins, then east along County Road 22 to a new terminus at a diamond interchange with the new freeway.

By 1973, SR 219 experienced a re-routing through eastern Mercer County. The designation was removed from what is now County Road 219A, and applied to what was a former eastern extension of SR 703 along the south side of Grand Lake Saint Marys between the Burge Road intersection and the Mercer-Auglaize County Line. Jurisdiction of the former southerly routing of SR 219 was turned over to Mercer County, and the aforementioned designation of County Road 219A was applied to it.

== Major intersections ==
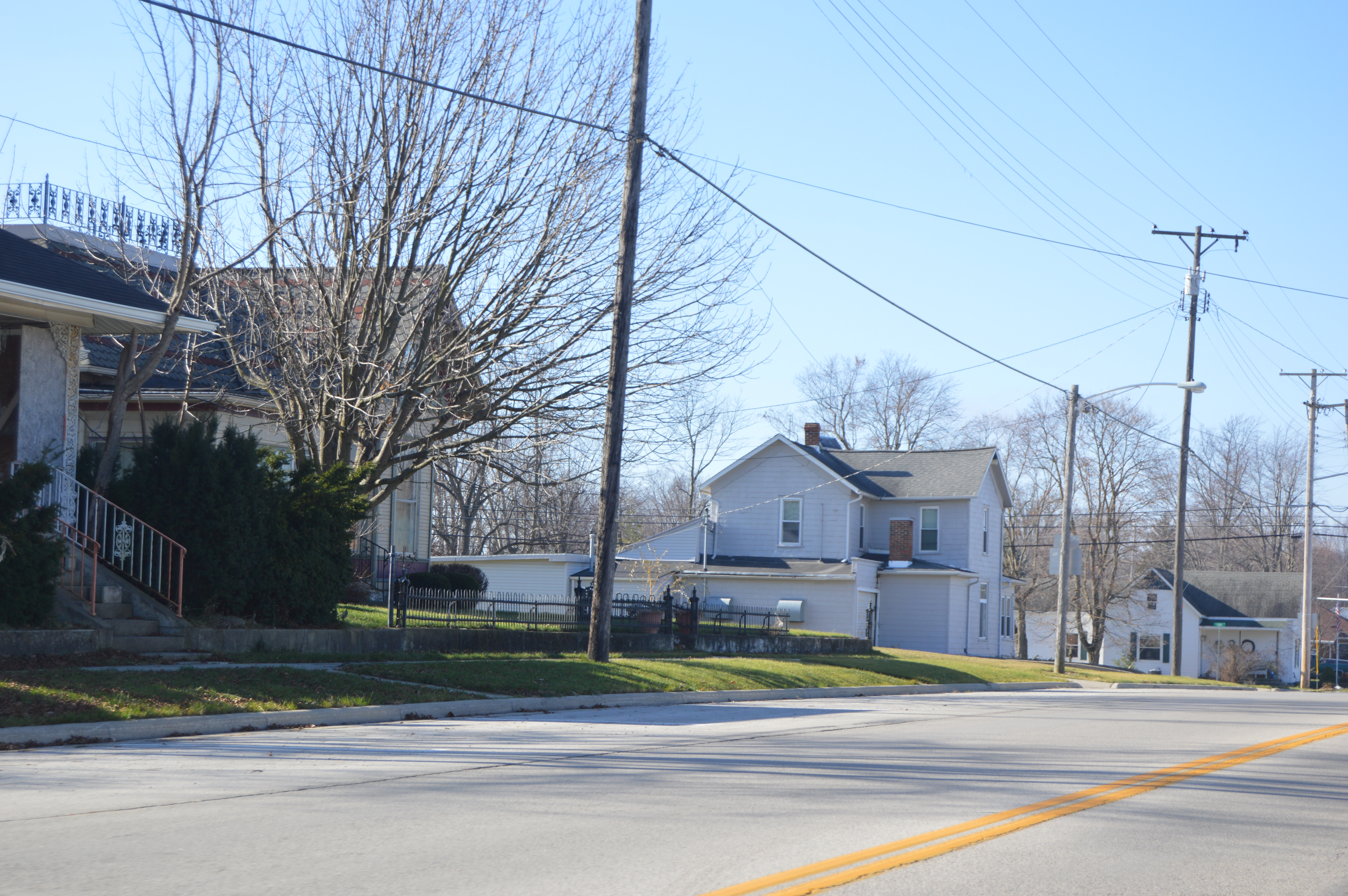
SR 219 in Montezuma

County	Location	mi	km	Destinations	Notes
Mercer	Washington Township	0.000	0.000	CR 300 N / Indiana–Ohio State Line Road	Western terminus at state line
Mercer	Washington Township	1.088	1.751	SR 49	
Mercer	Coldwater	9.289	14.949	SR 118 (Second Street)	
Mercer	Franklin Township	12.336	19.853	US 127	
Mercer	Montezuma	13.559	21.821	SR 703 (North Canal Street)	Western terminus of SR 703
Auglaize	Saint Marys Township	21.001	33.798	SR 364	
Auglaize	Saint Marys Township	24.021	38.658	SR 66	
Auglaize	New Knoxville	27.241	43.840	SR 29 (Main Street)	
Auglaize	Pusheta Township	34.141	54.945	CR 25A (Dixie Highway)	Western end of Dixie Highway concurrency
Shelby	Botkins	36.181	58.228	CR 25A (Dixie Highway / Main Street)	Eastern end of Dixie Highway concurrency
Shelby	Botkins	36.798– 37.169	59.221– 59.818	I-75	Diamond interchange
1.000 mi = 1.609 km; 1.000 km = 0.621 mi: Concurrency terminus
