= List of highways numbered 363 =

The following highways are numbered 363:

== Canada ==
- Manitoba Provincial Road 363
- New Brunswick Route 363
- Newfoundland and Labrador Route 363
- Quebec Route 363
- Saskatchewan Highway 363

== Japan ==
- Japan National Route 363

== United States ==
- Arkansas Highway 363
- Florida State Road 363
- Georgia State Route 363 (former)
  - Georgia State Route 363 Spur (former)
- Maryland Route 363
- New York State Route 363 (disambiguation)
- Ohio State Route 363
- Pennsylvania Route 363
- Puerto Rico Highway 363
- South Carolina Highway 363
- Texas:
  - Texas State Highway 363
  - Farm to Market Road 363
- Virginia State Route 363

Preceded by 362	Lists of highways 363	Succeeded by 364
