= Kossuth, Ohio =

Unincorporated community in Ohio, U.S.

Coordinates: 40°39′34″N 84°20′53″W

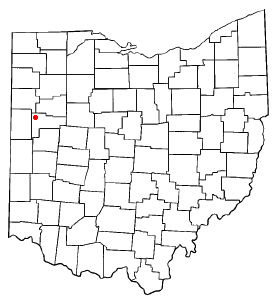
Location of Kossuth, Ohio

Kossuth is an unincorporated community located in eastern Salem Township, Auglaize County, Ohio, United States.

It is located along State Routes 66 and 197 between Saint Marys and Spencerville. The community is served by the Spencerville Local School District and the Spencerville (45887) post office.

Kossuth is named in honor of Lajos Kossuth, a Hungarian revolutionary hero who led the democratic, anti-Habsburg Hungarian Revolution of 1848.

Kossuth was platted and organized along the Miami and Erie Canal as Deep Cut in 1845, adopting its current name in 1859. Incorporated in 1897, the village surrendered its charter several years later in 1910.
