= List of highways numbered 362 =

The following highways are numbered 362:

== Canada ==
- Manitoba Provincial Road 362
- Newfoundland and Labrador Route 362
- Nova Scotia Route 362
- Quebec Route 362
- Saskatchewan Highway 362

== Japan ==
- Japan National Route 362

== United States ==
- Arkansas Highway 362
- Georgia State Route 362
- Indiana State Road 362
- Kentucky Route 362
- Maryland Route 362
- Nevada State Route 362 (unsigned designation for U.S. Route 95 Truck)
- New York:
  - New York State Route 362
  - County Route 362 (Albany County, New York)
- Ohio State Route 362
- Pennsylvania Route 362
- Puerto Rico Highway 362
- Tennessee State Route 362
- Texas State Highway 362 (former)
- Virginia State Route 362

Preceded by 361	Lists of highways 362	Succeeded by 363
