= Ohio State Route 364 =

North-south state highway in Ohio, US

State Route 364

Route information
- Maintained by ODOT
- Length: 16.73 mi (26.92 km)
- Existed: 1934–present

Major junctions
- South end: SR 705 near Yorkshire
- SR 703 in St. Marys
- North end: SR 29 near St. Marys

Location
- Country: United States
- State: Ohio
- Counties: Darke, Mercer, Auglaize

Highway system
- Ohio State Highway System; Interstate; US; State; Scenic
← SR 363	→ SR 365

State Route 364 (SR 364) is a north–south state route in Ohio. It starts from SR 705 near Yorkshire. The route moves north across several counties, then northeast against the side of the Grand Lake. SR 364 then travels west along a concurrency with SR 703, and ends at SR 29 near St. Marys. The route was designated in 1934, from SR 219 to SR 29. It was extended southwards to SR 705 in 1936 and completely paved by 1940. SR 364 was also extended in 1973 to the new alignment of SR 29.

== Route description ==
Traffic volume on State Route 364
County Log Point	Volume
0.6	1,286
0.973	1,340
5.433	1,845
8.328	2,311
10.099	2,738
13.246	3,930
14.056	5,477
15.422	2,252
County log points reset at county line; Volume: AADT; Source:

The route travels through portions of Darke, Mercer, and Auglaize Counties. SR 364 starts at SR 705, on the Darke–Shelby county line. The route goes north in a straight line, through 53 yards (0.030 mi) of Mercer County, and continues onto the Auglaize–Shelby county line. SR 364 continues into Auglaize County, where it passes by the St. Joseph Catholic Church, a historic site. The highway intersects SR 119 in Minister and SR 274 in New Bremen. Later, SR 364 intersects SR 219, and travels northeast, adjacent to the eastern side of the Grand Lake. Here, the farmland transitions into forests. The route meets at a T-intersection with SR 703. The SR 364 and SR 703 concurrency travels northwestward, and SR 364 splits and heads north, after slightly more than a mile. SR 364 crosses a railroad track, and ends at a diamond interchange at SR 29. The road continues as County Road 15 after this point.

== History ==
Around 1932, a gravel road from SR 219 to SR 32 was built in Auglaize County, and was designated as SR 364 two years later. In 1936, the designation was extended southward along a gravel road from its terminus at SR 219. This changed the southern terminus to SR 705, east of Osgood in Darke County. SR 364's northern terminus, SR 32, was renumbered to SR 54 in 1938, and it was renumbered again to SR 29 one year later. The section of SR 364 from SR 219 to SR 29 was also paved at this time. All of the highway was paved by 1940. In 1973, SR 29 was realigned northward to a divided highway, and its old alignment became part of SR 703. SR 364 was also extended to SR 29 via a concurrency with SR 703.

== Major intersections ==
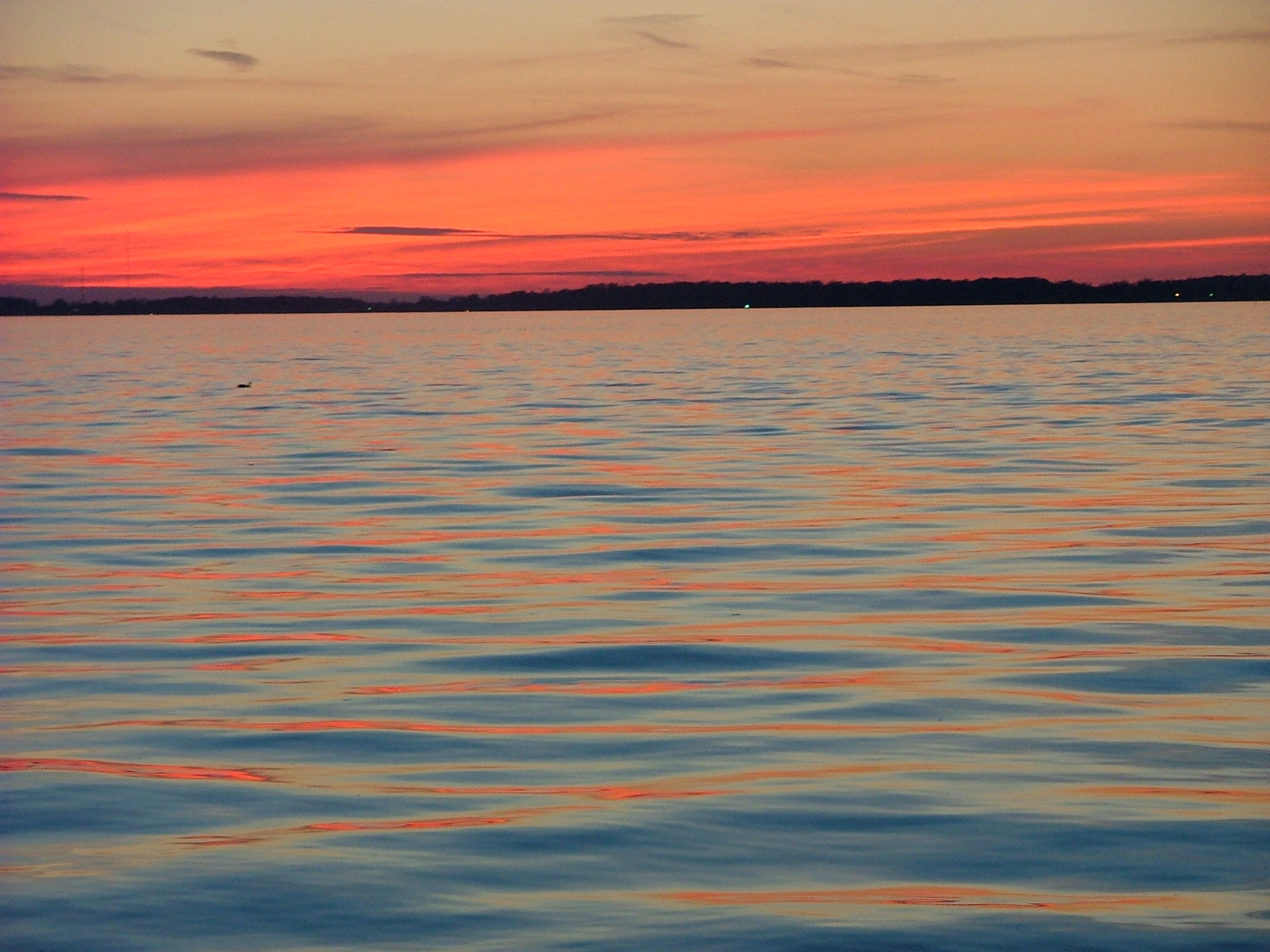
Grand Lake St. Marys State Park, located near SR 364

County	Location	mi	km	Destinations	Notes
Darke–Shelby county line	Patterson Township	0.00	0.00	SR 705	Southern terminus
Mercer	No major junctions				
Shelby–Auglaize county line	No major junctions				
Auglaize	Jackson Township	4.76	7.66	SR 119	
Auglaize	German Township	6.78	10.91	SR 274	
Auglaize	St. Marys Township	10.80	17.38	SR 219	
Auglaize	St. Marys	14.61	23.51	SR 703 (Jackson Street)	Southern end of concurrency
Auglaize	St. Marys Township	16.19	26.06	SR 703 (Celina Road)	Northern end of concurrency
Auglaize	Noble Township	16.73	26.92	SR 29	Northern terminus; County Road 15 continues after this point
1.000 mi = 1.609 km; 1.000 km = 0.621 mi: Concurrency terminus
