= Ohio State Route 119 =

East-west state highway in Ohio, US

State Route 119

Route information
- Maintained by ODOT
- Length: 41.94 mi (67.50 km)
- Existed: 1924–present

Major junctions
- West end: SR 26 near Fort Recovery
- US 127 near St. Henry; I-75 near Anna
- East end: SR 65 near Jackson Center

Location
- Country: United States
- State: Ohio
- Counties: Mercer, Auglaize, Shelby

Highway system
- Ohio State Highway System; Interstate; US; State; Scenic
← SR 118	→ SR 120

State Route 119 (SR 119) is an east–west highway serving rural sections of west-central Ohio. It begins just west of Fort Recovery at the eastern terminus of Indiana State Road 26. It travels through Mercer, Auglaize, and Shelby counties to end at SR 65 in Jackson Township, Shelby County. The route is 42-mile-long (68 km) and serves the medium-size villages of Fort Recovery, St. Henry, Minster, and Anna.

== Route description ==
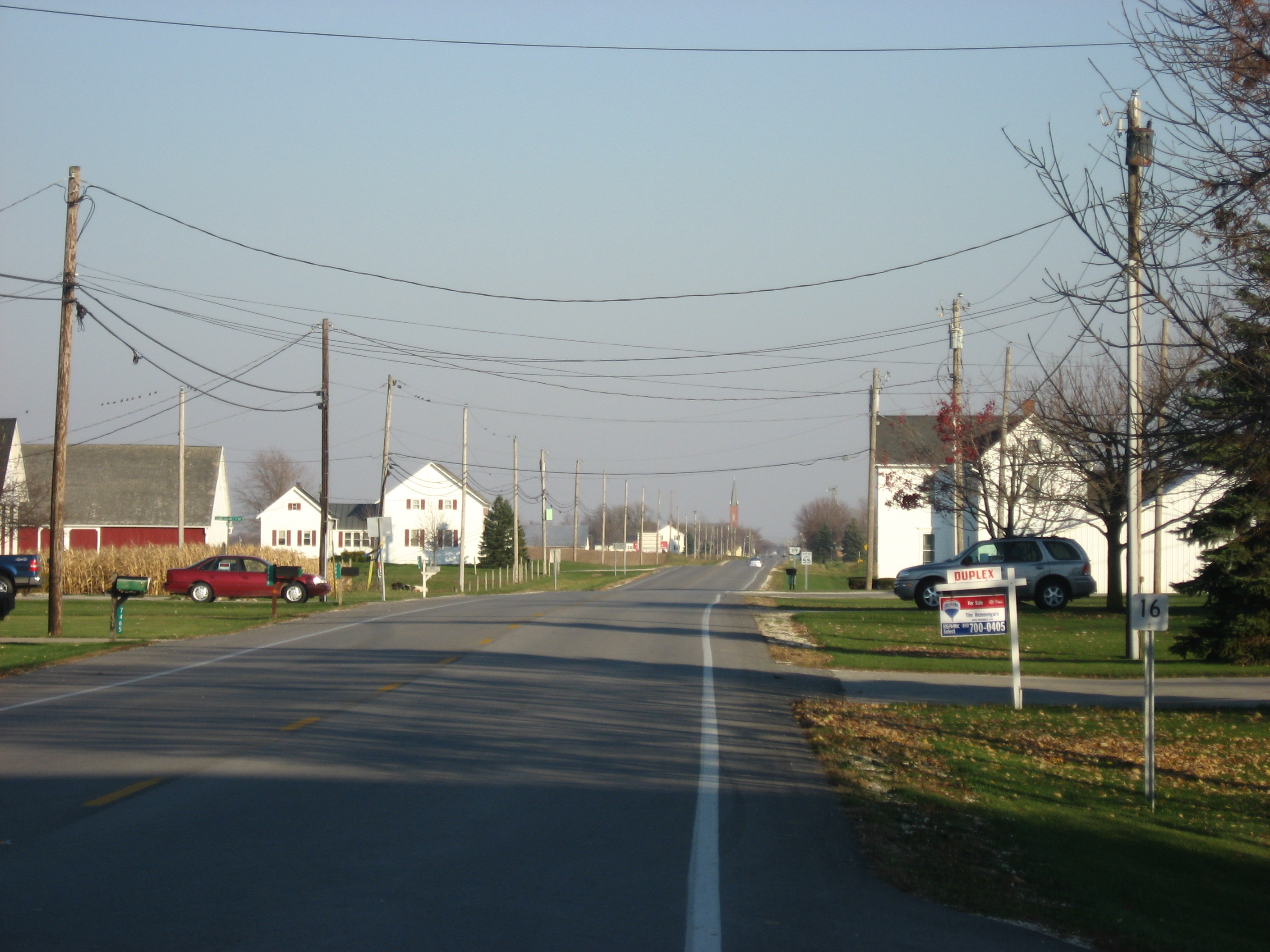
Looking east along SR 119 in St. Rose, Mercer County. The steeple of St. John the Baptist Catholic Church in Maria Stein is visible in the background.

SR 119 begins at the Indiana–Ohio border about 1 mile (1.6 km) west of Fort Recovery. At this point State Line Road runs north and south along the border while the highway continues west as Indiana State Road 26 towards Portland, Indiana. After immediately crossing an R.J. Corman Railroad Group rail line, SR 119 travels east into Fort Recovery on Butler Avenue. In the center of the village, SR 119 intersects SR 49. Further east in the village, the route follows Boundary Street and sharply curves to the northeast to cross the Wabash River near its mouth. The road curves to the due east and travels through farmland before making a reverse curve to the south to enter St. Henry. Passing through the town on Western Avenue and Main Street, SR 119 intersects SR 118 near the village's eastern border. After making one more diagonal cut to the southeast, SR 119 again travels due east through the farmland of Mercer County. After intersecting U.S. Route 127, the highway passes through numerous unincorporated communities in an area known as the Land of the Cross-Tipped Churches. Examples of such communities and churches include Cassella's Nativity of the Blessed Virgin Mary Catholic Church and Maria Stein's St. John the Baptist Catholic Church, respectively. In Maria Stein, SR 119 intersects SR 716.

The road crosses into the southern panhandle of Auglaize County, specifically Jackson Township. At first, the route heads through rural farmland, similar to how it traveled through Mercer County. It intersects SR 364 near the western border of the county but then travels along the northern border of Minster before forming a 1-mile-long (1.6 km) concurrency with SR 66 towards the south. In downtown Minster, the two roads follow Main Street and pass the campus of Minster High School. In the center of the village's business district, SR 119 splits from the SR 66 concurrency at Fourth Street and travels due east again. East of the village limits, the route intersects SR 363, a short spur route to the shoreline of Lake Loramie and its namesake state park. The road enters Shelby County, passes over Loramie Creek, and enters the unincorporated community of McCartyville where it has a skewed intersection with SR 29. SR 119 passes through the village of Anna where it intersects Market Street, the former routing of U.S. Route 25 and Dixie Highway. On the east side of the village, it has an interchange with Interstate 75 at its exit 99. In the immediate vicinity of the interchange, numerous fast food restaurants, gas stations, and truck stops are found. East of the interchange, the road continues for seven miles (11 km) through rural farmland before terminating at a T-intersection with SR 65, about halfway between SR 65's terminus and Jackson Center.

== History ==
The SR 119 designation was created in 1923 following what is now its current route from the Indiana border to SR 29 in Shelby County. The designation was overlaid on existing State Highways 171 and 172 which had been under state control since the initial designation of highways in 1912. In 1937, SR 119 was extended east to SR 65, its present terminus. No major changes to SR 119's alignment have occurred since then.

== Major intersections ==
County	Location	mi	km	Destinations	Notes
Mercer	Recovery Township	0.00	0.00	SR 26 west / State Line Road	Indiana state line
Mercer	Fort Recovery	1.50	2.41	SR 49 (Elm Street)	
Mercer	St. Henry	9.62	15.48	SR 118 (Eastern Avenue) – Ansonia, Coldwater	
Mercer	Granville–Marion township line	12.89	20.74	US 127 – Greenville, Celina	
Mercer	Marion Township	17.02	27.39	SR 716	
Auglaize	Jackson Township	20.17	32.46	SR 364	
Auglaize	Minster	23.19	37.32	SR 66 north / CR 40 (Bensman Road) – New Bremen, St. Marys	Western end of SR 66 concurrency
Auglaize	Minster	24.20	38.95	SR 66 south (Main Street) / 4th Street	Eastern end of SR 66 concurrency
Auglaize	Jackson Township	25.71	41.38	SR 363 south	Northern terminus of SR 363
Shelby	Van Buren Township	30.53	49.13	SR 29 – Sidney	
Shelby	Franklin–Dinsmore township line	35.52– 35.66	57.16– 57.39	I-75 – Dayton, Toledo	Exit 99 (I-75)
Shelby	Jackson Township	41.94	67.50	SR 65	
1.000 mi = 1.609 km; 1.000 km = 0.621 mi: Concurrency terminus
