= Ohio State Route 362 =

State highway in western Ohio, US

State Route 362

Route information
- Maintained by ODOT
- Length: 4.56 mi (7.34 km)
- Existed: 1932–present

Major junctions
- South end: SR 66 in Fort Loramie
- North end: SR 66 in Minster

Location
- Country: United States
- State: Ohio
- Counties: Shelby, Auglaize

Highway system
- Ohio State Highway System; Interstate; US; State; Scenic
← SR 361	→ SR 363

State Route 362 (SR 362) is a 4.56-mile (7.34 km) north–south state highway in the western part of the U.S. state of Ohio. It serves to connect Lake Loramie State Park with SR 66. Its southern terminus is in Fort Loramie at the intersection of North Main Street (SR 66) and Elm Street. near the northern edge of Fort Loramie. SR 362 then runs about 1.1 miles (1.8 km) east, then turns north at its intersection with Fort Loramie–Swanders Road (which continues east). SR 362 then runs northerly along the western edge of Lake Loramie and Lake Loramie State Park before turning northwesterly then westerly and enters Minster and reaches its northern terminus at the intersection of South Main Street (SR 66) and First Street.

== Route description ==
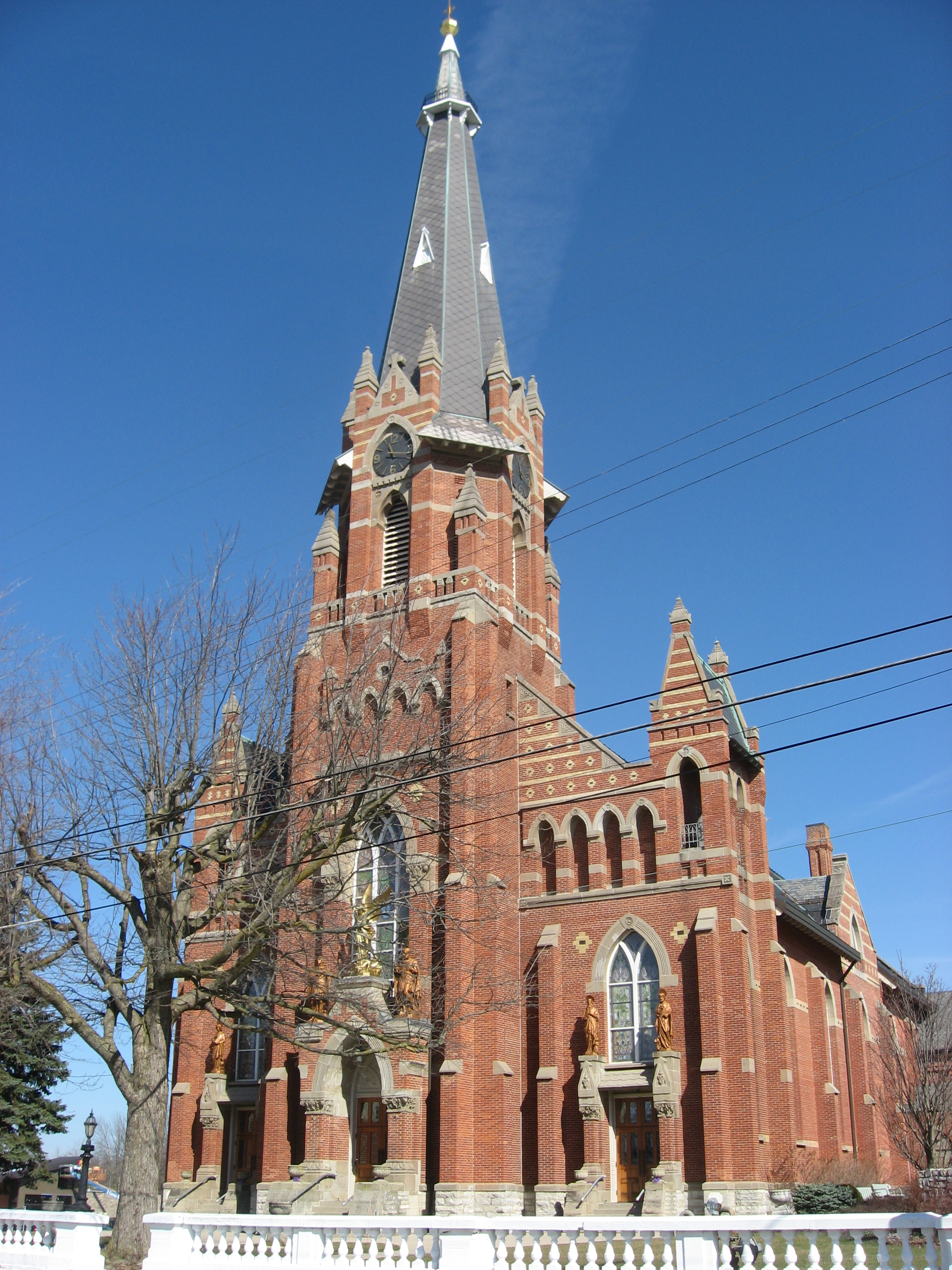
St. Michael's Catholic Church is located on SR 362 in Fort Loramie

SR 362 runs for 3.24 miles (5.21 km) in Shelby County and for 1.32 miles (2.12 km) in Auglaize County. The highway is not a part of the National Highway System.

SR 362 begins at the northern edge of the business district in Fort Loramie. After passing the St. Michael's Catholic Church and several houses and business, the highway goes east out of town and enters farmland. After turning north at the intersection with Fort Loramie–Swanders Road, SR 362 passes a picnic area. It then crosses onto Crawford Island where the campgrounds and beach for Lake Loramie State Park are located. After leaving the island, it runs along the western edge of the main portion of Lake Loramie. SR 362 then passes fishing areas on the east side of the road and houses on the west side before turning northwest then west and entering farmland before entering Minster. Once it enters Minster, SR 362 runs west to its northern terminus with South Main Street (SR 66) with houses along the north side of the road and businesses on the south side.

== History ==
In 1932, an unnumbered state highway following the general route of the modern-day SR 362 was established on the west side of Lake Loramie. This route started at Fort Loramie-Swanders Road (modern-day County Road 27) and traveled north to the intersection of Main Street and First Street in Minster. By 1934, the route had been formally designated SR 362. A second, unconnected segment of SR 362 was designated in 1937 on the southern side of Lake Loramie. This segment ran 1.5 miles (2.4 km) from Fort Loramie-Swanders Road north to the vicinity of Filburns Island. Between 1955 and 1957, the discontinuous segment to Filburns Island was removed from the route and the southern terminus was moved to downtown Fort Loramie. Since then, no major changes have occurred to the routing.

== Major intersections ==
County	Location	mi	km	Destinations	Notes
Shelby	Fort Loramie	0.00	0.00	SR 66 (Main Street)	
Auglaize	Minster	4.56	7.34	SR 66 (Main Street)	
1.000 mi = 1.609 km; 1.000 km = 0.621 mi
