= List of highways numbered 364 =

The following highways are numbered 364:

== Brazil ==
- BR-364

== Canada ==
- Manitoba Provincial Road 364
- Newfoundland and Labrador Route 364
- Quebec Route 364
- Saskatchewan Highway 364

== Japan ==
- Japan National Route 364

== United States ==
- Arizona State Route 364
- Arkansas Highway 364
- Connecticut Route 364
- Georgia State Route 364 (former)
  - County Route 364 (Jasper County, Georgia)
- Indiana State Road 364
- Louisiana Highway 364 (former)
- Maryland Route 364
- Mississippi Highway 364
- Missouri Route 364
- New York State Route 364
- Ohio State Route 364
- Oklahoma State Highway 364 (Creek Turnpike)
- Puerto Rico Highway 364
- Tennessee State Route 364
- Texas State Highway 364
  - Texas State Highway Spur 364
- Virginia State Route 364

Preceded by 363	Lists of highways 364	Succeeded by 365
