= Ohio State Route 29 =

State highway in Ohio, US

State Route 29

Route information
- Maintained by ODOT
- Length: 102.94 mi (165.67 km)
- Existed: 1924–present

Major junctions
- West end: SR 67 near Wabash
- US 127 in Celina; US 33 in Saint Marys; I-75 near Sidney; US 36 in Urbana; US 68 in Urbana; US 42 near West Jefferson; I-70 near West Jefferson
- East end: US 40 in West Jefferson

Location
- Country: United States
- State: Ohio
- Counties: Mercer, Auglaize, Shelby, Champaign, Madison

Highway system
- Ohio State Highway System; Interstate; US; State; Scenic
← SR 28	→ US 30

State Route 29 (SR 29) is an east–west state highway in the west-central portion of the U.S. state of Ohio. Its western terminus is at the Indiana state line near Celina, where State Road 67 continues west. It continues east to St. Marys where it junctions with U.S. Route 33. In that town, it also crosses State Route 66, State Route 116, and State Route 703, which was its former alignment before a divided highway was built. After turning south it crosses State Route 219 in New Knoxville and then has an interchange with Interstate 75, continuing into Sidney where it meets State Route 47. Still going southeast, it briefly joins State Route 235 before turning east and then south again to enter Urbana. Here the route joins U.S. Route 36, and the concurrency intersects with U.S. Route 68 and State Route 54. From there, State Route 29 leaves U.S. Route 36 and continues to Mutual, intersecting with State Route 161, and State Route 56 shortly after; later, in Mechanicsburg, the route intersects with State Route 4. The route then intersects with State Route 38, U.S. Route 42, and Interstate 70 before reaching its eastern terminus at U.S. Route 40 on the western edge of West Jefferson.

== History ==
The original route was established in 1924. Originally routed along the current alignments of State Route 571 from the Indiana state line in Union City to 1-mile (1.6 km) east of Greenville, U.S. Route 36 from 1-mile (1.6 km) east of Greenville to Urbana, and its current alignment from Urbana to 2 miles (3.2 km) west of West Jefferson.

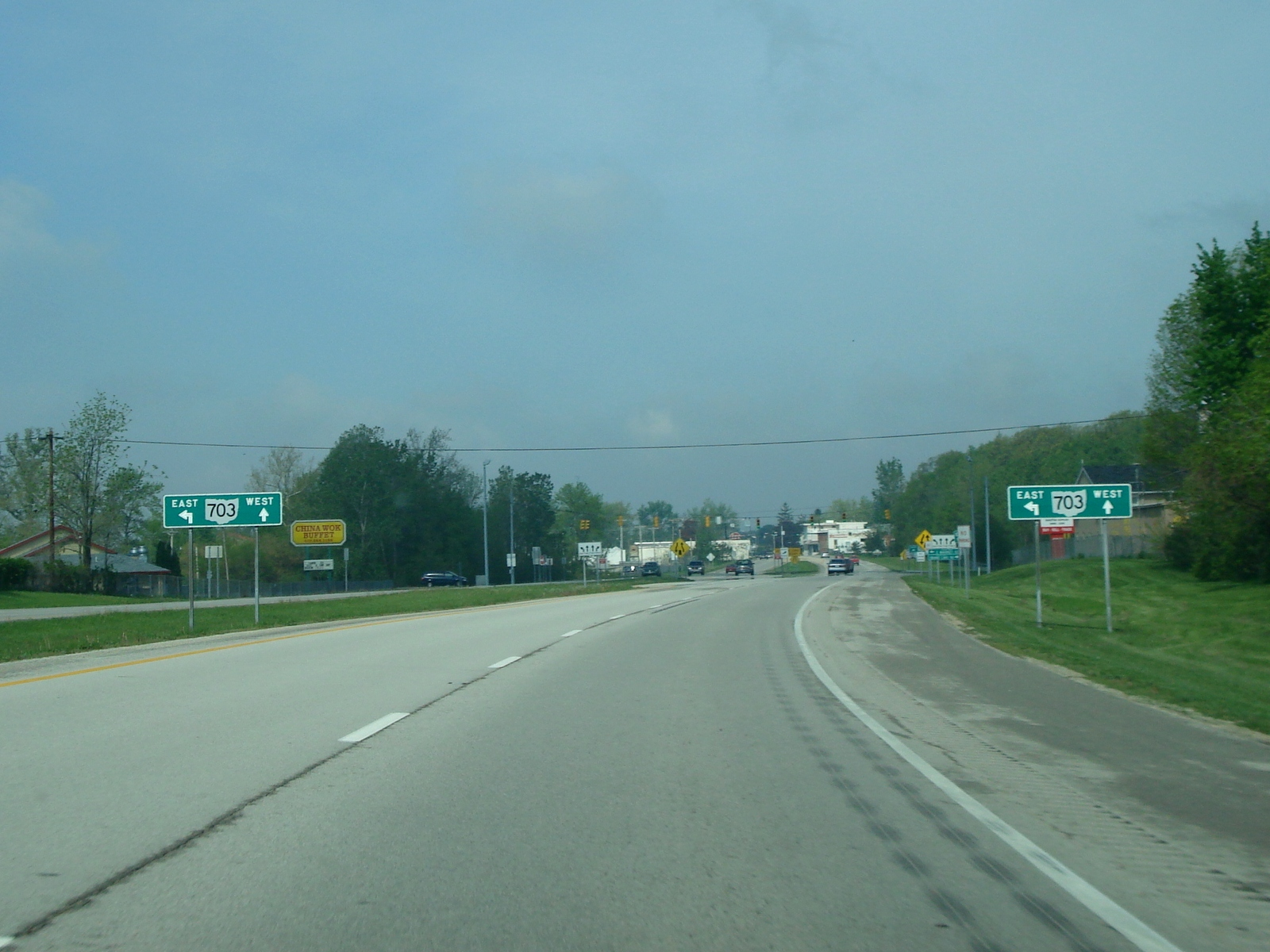
WB OH 29 approaching the eastern junction of SR 29 and SR 703 in Celina.

The route was truncated in 1932 at Urbana; alignment from Union City to Greenville designated as State Route 71; Greenville to Urbana designated as U.S. Route 36.

The route was extended in 1939 to the Indiana state line along the former State Route 54 alignment (which was State Route 32 before 1938).

In 1973, divided highway alignment was constructed from Celina to State Route 364 and freeway alignment constructed from State Route 364 to U.S. Route 33; former alignment designated State Route 703.

== Major junctions ==
County	Location	mi	km	Destinations	Notes
Mercer	Washington Township	0.00	0.00	SR 67 south / State Line Road – Bryant	Indiana state line
Mercer	Washington Township	0.96	1.54	SR 49 – Willshire, Fort Recovery	
Mercer	Jefferson Township	8.17	13.15	SR 118 north / CR 81 (Burkettsville St. Henry Road) – Rockford	Western end of SR 118 concurrency
Mercer	Jefferson Township	9.17	14.76	SR 118 south / T-91 – Coldwater	Eastern end of SR 118 concurrency
Mercer	Celina	12.21	19.65	US 127 south / SR 703 east (Main Street) / Logan Street	Western end of US 127 / SR 703 concurrencies
Mercer	Celina	12.44	20.02	US 127 north / SR 197 east (Main Street) / Market Street	Eastern end of US 127 concurrency; western terminus of SR 197
Mercer	Celina	13.46	21.66	SR 703 east (East Market Street) / Grand Lake Road – Wright State University Lake Campus	Eastern end of SR 703 concurrency
Auglaize	Noble Township	19.22– 19.55	30.93– 31.46	SR 364 south / CR 15 (Koenig Road)	Interchange; northern terminus of SR 364
Auglaize	Noble Township	20.54– 21.11	33.06– 33.97	US 33 – Columbus, Fort Wayne, Ind.	Interchange
Auglaize	St. Marys	22.17	35.68	SR 116 north (Defiance Road) / Dieker Place	Western end of SR 116 concurrency
Auglaize	St. Marys	22.67	36.48	SR 66 south (Main Street) / SR 116 ends (Spring Street) / SR 703 west	Eastern end of SR 116 concurrency; western end of SR 66 concurrency; eastern terminus of SR 703
Auglaize	St. Marys	23.03	37.06	SR 66 north (Spruce Street)	Eastern end of SR 66 concurrency
Auglaize	New Knoxville	28.77	46.30	SR 219 (Spring Street)	
Shelby	Van Buren Township	32.73	52.67	SR 274 west / Schmitmeyer Baker Road – New Bremen	Western end of SR 274 concurrency
Shelby	Van Buren Township	33.58	54.04	SR 274 east – Kettlersville	Eastern end of SR 274 concurrency
Shelby	Van Buren Township	37.40	60.19	SR 119 – Anna, Minster	
Shelby	Franklin Township	41.70	67.11	SR 705 west / CR 15 (Sharp Road) – Fort Loramie, Osgood	Eastern terminus of SR 705
Shelby	Clinton Township	44.36– 44.52	71.39– 71.65	I-75 – Dayton, Toledo	Exit 93 (I-75)
Shelby	Sidney	46.66	75.09	SR 47 (North Street)	Western end of SR 47 westbound concurrency
Shelby	Sidney	46.83	75.37	SR 47 west (Court Street) / Ohio Avenue	Eastern end of SR 47 westbound concurrency; western end of SR 47 eastbound concurrency
Shelby	Sidney	46.91	75.49	SR 47 east (Main Avenue)	Eastern end of SR 47 eastbound concurrency
Shelby	Perry Township	49.74	80.05	SR 706 east	Western terminus of SR 706
Shelby	Green Township	53.41	85.96	SR 589 south	Northern terminus of SR 589
Champaign	Adams Township	58.34	93.89	SR 235 south	Western end of SR 235 concurrency
Champaign	Adams Township	58.66	94.40	SR 235 north	Eastern end of SR 235 concurrency
Champaign	Adams Township	60.69	97.67	SR 245 east / CR 31 (Ford Road) – Springhills	Western terminus of SR 245
Champaign	Concord Township	66.06	106.31	SR 560 south	Northern terminus of SR 560
Champaign	Salem Township	71.74	115.45	SR 296 east	Western terminus of SR 296
Champaign	Urbana	75.21	121.04	US 36 west (Miami Street)	Western end of US 36 concurrency
Champaign	Urbana	75.88	122.12	US 68 (Main Street)	Traffic circle
Champaign	Urbana	76.68	123.40	SR 54 south (Jefferson Avenue)	Northern terminus of SR 54
Champaign	Urbana	77.05	124.00	US 36 east	Eastern end of US 36 concurrency
Champaign	Mutual	82.44	132.67	SR 161 east	Western terminus of SR 161
Champaign	Union Township	83.13	133.78	SR 56 east – London	Western terminus of SR 56
Champaign	Mechanicsburg	86.60	139.37	SR 559 north (High Street)	Western end of SR 559 concurrency
Champaign	Mechanicsburg	86.87	139.80	SR 4 (Sandusky Street) / SR 559 ends	Eastern end of SR 559 concurrency
Champaign	Goshen Township	88.35	142.19	SR 187 south	Northern terminus of SR 187
Madison	Monroe–Deer Creek township line	59.91	96.42	SR 38 – Marysville, London	
Madison	Jefferson Township	99.52	160.16	US 42 – Plain City, London	
Madison	Jefferson Township	100.46– 100.73	161.67– 162.11	I-70 – Springfield, Columbus	Exit 80 (I-70); westbound I-70 ramps intersect SR 29 at roundabout
Madison	West Jefferson	102.94	165.67	US 40 (National Pike)	
1.000 mi = 1.609 km; 1.000 km = 0.621 mi: Concurrency terminus
