= Ohio State Route 705 =

State highway in western Ohio, US

State Route 705

Route information
- Maintained by ODOT
- Length: 28.85 mi (46.43 km)
- Existed: 1937–present

Major junctions
- West end: SR 49 near Fort Recovery
- US 127 near North Star
- East end: SR 29 / CR 15 near Sidney

Location
- Country: United States
- State: Ohio
- Counties: Darke, Shelby

Highway system
- Ohio State Highway System; Interstate; US; State; Scenic
← SR 704	→ SR 706

State Route 705 (SR 705) is a state highway in western Ohio, a U.S. state. The highway's western terminus is in rural northwestern Darke County at SR 49 approximately 5.25 miles (8.45 km) southeast of Fort Recovery, and just a mile south of the Darke-Mercer County Line. Its eastern terminus is at SR 29 nearly 2.75 miles (4.43 km) northwest of Sidney.

Established in the late 1930s, SR 705 connects the northern half of Darke County to the city of Sidney. The highway goes through rural areas in Darke County, passing through the villages of New Weston and Osgood heading east. The road follows very close to the Mercer County Line throughout Darke County. In Shelby County, Fort Loramie is the only village along the road.

== Route description ==
Along its path, SR 705 travels through parts of the counties of Darke and Shelby. There are no stretches of this state route that are inclusive within the National Highway System.

== History ==
SR 705 was designated in 1937. The route has not experienced any major changes to its alignment since its inception.

== Major intersections ==
County	Location	mi	km	Destinations	Notes
Darke	Mississinawa Township	0.00	0.00	SR 49 – Greenville, Fort Recovery	
Darke	New Weston	5.47	8.80	SR 118	
Darke	Wabash Township	9.03	14.53	US 127 – Greenville, Celina	
Darke	Osgood	13.03	20.97	SR 716 north (North Street)	Southern terminus of SR 716
Darke–Shelby county line	Patterson–McLean township line	16.47	26.51	SR 364 north	Southern terminus of SR 364
Shelby	Fort Loramie	19.75	31.78	SR 66 (Main Street)	
Shelby	Clinton Township	28.85	46.43	SR 29 / CR 15 (Sharp Road) – New Bremen, Sidney	
1.000 mi = 1.609 km; 1.000 km = 0.621 mi
