= O12 =

O12 or O-12 may refer to:

- Curtiss O-12 Falcon, an observation aircraft of the United States Army Air Corps
- Grand Lake St. Marys Seaplane Base, in Auglaize County, Ohio, United States
- HNLMS O 12, a submarine of the Royal Netherlands Navy
- Oxygen-12, an isotope of oxygen
- USS O-12 (SS-73), a submarine of the United States Navy
