= Ohio State Route 190 =

State highway in western Ohio, US

State Route 190

Route information
- Maintained by ODOT
- Length: 8.93 mi (14.37 km)
- Existed: 1923–present

Major junctions
- South end: SR 66 / SR 697 in Delphos
- North end: US 224 near Ottoville

Location
- Country: United States
- State: Ohio
- Counties: Allen, Putnam

Highway system
- Ohio State Highway System; Interstate; US; State; Scenic
← SR 189	→ SR 191

State Route 190 (SR 190) is a 8.93-mile-long (14.37 km) north–south state highway in the western portion of the U.S. state of Ohio. The southern terminus of SR 190 is at an intersection with SR 66 in Delphos. Its northern terminus is at an intersection with US 224 approximately 4 miles (6.4 km) east of Ottoville.

SR 190 designation was applied in the mid-1920s, to some of the same route as today, the rest was SR 106. A year after its designation it was extended, replacing a section of SR 106. The last section of road was paved in the late 1930s.

== Route description ==
Along its path, SR 190 passes through the northern portion of Allen County and the western portion of Putnam County. There are no segments of SR 190 that are included as a part of the National Highway System.

SR 190 begins in Delphos, where SR 66 and SR 697. SR 190 heads east concurrent with SR 66, on East 5th Street. Here, SR 190 has its highest traffic counts; within the 2011 ODOT survey, the road is listed with an average annual daily traffic(AADT) of 5,780 vehicles on a section of highway that is concurrent with SR 66. The road passes through downtown Delphos and mostly residential properties, as a four-lane highway. The highway turns north onto Fort Jennings Road, ending its concurrency with SR 66. Fort Jennings Road heads north through residential properties, as a two-lane highway. SR 190 leaves Delphos and enters rural Allen County, before entering rural Putnam County. The route passes under U.S. Route 30 (US 30), before curving northeast. The road enters Fort Jennings and parallels the Auglaize River.

SR 190 enters the central part of the village, passing through a mix of residential and commercial properties. The highway begins a concurrency with SR 189. The two state routes are concurrent for three blocks, before SR 189 turns northwest. At the northern end of the concurrency with SR 189, SR 634, begins a concurrency with SR 190. the two routes continues northeast, until the village limits of Fort Jennings. At the village limits SR 634 heads due north and SR 190 continues northeast. North of SR 634, the AADT drops to 640 vehicles. Northeast of Fort Jennings, the highway passing through farmland, with some houses. SR 190 ends at an intersection with US 224, in rural Putnam County. Continuing north after SR 190 ends is Township Road 22K.

== History ==
The SR 190 designation was applied in 1923, on the same route as today north of Fort Jennings. The southern terminus was a SR 106, now SR 189. In 1924, the route was extended south to Delphos, replacing SR 106 from Delphos to Fort Jennings. The section of road north of Fort Jennings was paved in 1939.

== Major intersections ==
County	Location	mi	km	Destinations	Notes
Allen	Delphos	0.00	0.00	SR 66 north / SR 697 south	Western end of SR 66 concurrency
Allen	Delphos	0.54	0.87	SR 66 south	Eastern end of SR 66 concurrency
Putnam	Fort Jennings	5.23	8.42	SR 189 east	Southwestern end of SR 189 concurrency; northern terminus of SR 697
Putnam	Fort Jennings	5.42	8.72	SR 189 west	Northeastern end of SR concurrency
Putnam	Fort Jennings	5.69	9.16	SR 634 north	Southern terminus of SR 634
Putnam	Jackson Township	8.93	14.37	US 224	
1.000 mi = 1.609 km; 1.000 km = 0.621 mi: Concurrency terminus
