= Ohio State Route 363 =

North-south state highway in Ohio, US

State Route 363

Route information
- Maintained by ODOT
- Length: 1.43 mi (2.30 km)
- Existed: 1934–present

Major junctions
- South end: Lotus Road near Minster
- North end: SR 119 near Minster

Location
- Country: United States
- State: Ohio
- Counties: Shelby, Auglaize

Highway system
- Ohio State Highway System; Interstate; US; State; Scenic
← SR 362	→ SR 364

State Route 363 (SR 363) is a short north–south state highway located in west-central Ohio. The southern terminus of this spur route is along the shores of Lake Loramie approximately two and a half miles (4.0 km) southeast of Minster, where the roadway becomes known as Lotus Road. The northern terminus of SR 363 is at a T-intersection with SR 119 about one mile (1.6 km) east of Minster.

Created in the middle of the 1930s, this short highway, which exists in both Shelby and Auglaize counties, provides access from SR 119 to a small community of cottages situated on a peninsula that juts out from the north side of Lake Loramie.

== Route description ==
SR 363 runs for less than one-half mile (0.80 km) in Shelby County and a little more than one mile (1.6 km) in Auglaize County. Around 490 vehicles use the road in Auglaize County on average every year, and 410 vehicles in Shelby County.

The route begins on a peninsula that juts out from the north shore of Lake Loramie in Shelby County's McLean Township, at a transition from Lotus Road, a street that continues for a short distance further onto the peninsula before dead ending. This peninsula is populated by a number of cottages. SR 363 traverses northeasterly through this community of cottages before turning north and heading into more rural territory. Bounded by farmland on the west side and woods on the east side, SR 363 intersects F and K Road, then crosses into Auglaize County's Jackson Township. At this point, the highway is now bordered by woods on the west and a pair of homes on the east, before entering fully into a landscape of open farmland. SR 363 passes a few homes prior to coming to its endpoint at a T-intersection with SR 119.

== History ==
This two-county spur route was first designated in 1934 along the routing that it occupies today. No major changes have taken place to this highway since its inception.

== Major intersections ==
County	Location	mi	km	Destinations	Notes
Shelby	McLean Township	0.00	0.00	Lotus Road	
Auglaize	Jackson Township	1.43	2.30	SR 119	
1.000 mi = 1.609 km; 1.000 km = 0.621 mi
