= List of highways numbered 361 =

The following highways are numbered 361:

== Canada ==
- Newfoundland and Labrador Route 361
- Quebec Route 361
- Saskatchewan Highway 361

== India ==
- National Highway 361 (India)

== Japan ==
- Japan National Route 361

== Thailand ==
- Thailand Route 361 (Bypass Chonburi Road)

== United Kingdom ==
- A361 road, Ilfracombe to Kilsby

== United States ==
- Arkansas Highway 361
- Connecticut Route 361
- Georgia State Route 361 (former)
- Hawaii Route 361
- Maryland Route 361
- Minnesota State Highway 361
- Nevada State Route 361
- New York State Route 361 (former)
- Ohio State Route 361
- Oregon Route 361 (former)
- Puerto Rico Highway 361
- Texas:
  - Texas State Highway 361
  - Farm to Market Road 361
- Virginia State Route 361

Preceded by 360	Lists of highways 361	Succeeded by 362
