= List of highways numbered 365 =

The following highways are numbered 365:

== Canada ==
- Manitoba Provincial Road 365
- New Brunswick Route 365
- Newfoundland and Labrador Route 365
- Quebec Route 365
- Saskatchewan Highway 365

== Japan ==
- Japan National Route 365

== United States ==
- Arkansas Highway 365
  - Arkansas Highway 365 Spur
- Florida:
  - Florida State Road 365
  - County Road 365 (Wakulla County, Florida)
- Georgia State Route 365
- Hawaii Route 365
- Louisiana Highway 365
- Maryland Route 365
- Mississippi Highway 365
- New York:
  - New York State Route 365
    - New York State Route 365A
  - New York State Route 365 (former)
- Ohio State Route 365
- Texas State Highway 365
- Virginia State Route 365

Territories

- Puerto Rico Highway 365

Preceded by 364	Lists of highways 365	Succeeded by 366
