= Ohio State Route 697 =

State highway in western Ohio, US

State Route 697

Route information
- Maintained by ODOT
- Length: 7.54 mi (12.13 km)
- Existed: 1938–present

Major junctions
- West end: SR 116 near Middle Point
- East end: SR 66 / SR 190 in Delphos

Location
- Country: United States
- State: Ohio
- Counties: Van Wert, Allen

Highway system
- Ohio State Highway System; Interstate; US; State; Scenic
← SR 696	→ SR 698

State Route 697 (SR 697, OH 697) is an east–west state highway in the western portion of Ohio, a U.S. state. The western terminus of State Route 697 is located at its junction with State Route 116 approximately 2 miles (3.2 km) southwest of Middle Point. The eastern terminus of this route is located on the northern fringe of downtown Delphos, following a nearly 0.25 miles (0.40 km) concurrency with State Route 66 at a signalized intersection that doubles as the southern terminus of State Route 190.

== Route description ==
This state highway runs through the eastern portion of Van Wert County, and into the extreme northwestern corner of Allen County. State Route 697 is not a part of the National Highway System.

== History ==
State Route 697 was established in 1938 along the routing that it utilizes to this day. No changes of major significance have taken place to the highway throughout its history.

== Major intersections ==
County	Location	mi	km	Destinations	Notes
Van Wert	Ridge Township	0.00	0.00	SR 116 / Ringwald Road	
Allen	Delphos	7.31	11.76	SR 66 south (South Main Street) / East Second Street	Southern end of SR 66 concurrency
Allen	Delphos	7.54	12.13	SR 66 north / SR 190 north (Fifth Street) / North Main Street	Northern end of SR 66 concurrency; southern terminus of SR 190
1.000 mi = 1.609 km; 1.000 km = 0.621 mi: Concurrency terminus
