= Ohio State Route 116 =

State highway in western Ohio, US

State Route 116

Route information
- Maintained by ODOT
- Length: 30.93 mi (49.78 km)
- Existed: 1923–present

Major junctions
- South end: SR 29 / SR 66 / SR 703 in St. Marys
- North end: US 127 in Van Wert

Location
- Country: United States
- State: Ohio
- Counties: Auglaize, Van Wert

Highway system
- Ohio State Highway System; Interstate; US; State; Scenic
← SR 115	→ SR 117

State Route 116 (SR 116) is a north–south state highway in the western portion of the U.S. state of Ohio. The highway's southern terminus is at a signalized intersection with State Route 29, State Route 66, and the eastern terminus of State Route 703 in St. Marys. Its northern terminus is at another signalized intersection, this time with U.S. Route 127 in the southern end of Van Wert.

== Route description ==
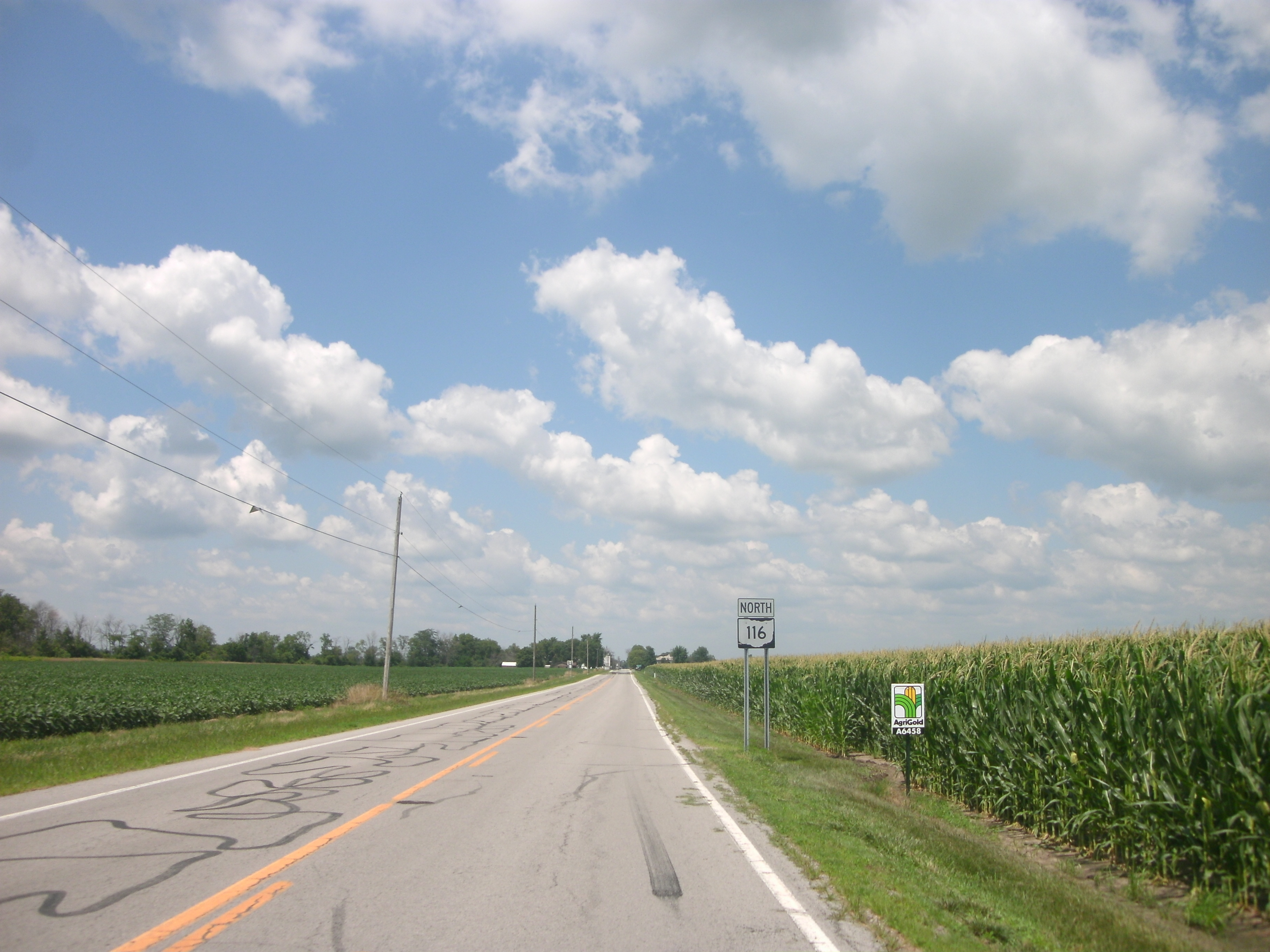
SR 116 in Van Wert County north of SR 117

State Route 116 travels through the western Ohio counties of Auglaize and Van Wert. No portion of this route is included within the National Highway System, a network of highways deemed most imperative for the nation's economy, mobility and defense.

== History ==
State Route 116's designation was assigned in 1923. For the first two years of its existence, the routing of State Route 116 included the present routing of State Route 198 from downtown Wapakoneta northwest to State Route 117 east of Spencerville, State Route 117 from that point west to its eastern intersection with State Route 116, and the present alignment of State Route 116 from there to its northern terminus in Van Wert. In 1925, State Route 116 was re-routed onto its present alignment from State Route 117 south to St. Marys. Prior to that time, this current segment of State Route 116 was designated as State Route 198. The former portions of State Route 116 were re-designated as State Route 117 and State Route 198, respectively, at that time.

== Major intersections ==
County	Location	mi	km	Destinations	Notes
Auglaize	St. Marys	0.00	0.00	SR 29 east / SR 66 / SR 703 west (West Spring Street / South Main Street)	Southern end of SR 29 concurrency, eastern terminus of SR 703
Auglaize	St. Marys	0.50	0.80	SR 29 west (Indiana Avenue) / Dieker Place	Northern end of SR 29 concurrency
Auglaize	Salem Township	7.24	11.65	SR 197 (Barber Werner Road)	
Van Wert	Jennings Township	13.09	21.07	SR 117 west / CR 193 (Louth Road)	Southern end of SR 117 concurrency
Van Wert	Jennings Township	13.59	21.87	SR 117 east / CR 195 (Biner Road) – Spencerville	Northern end of SR 117 concurrency
Van Wert	Jennings Township	15.60	25.11	SR 81 / CR 32 (Elgin Converse Road)	
Van Wert	York–Jennings township line	20.20	32.51	SR 709 west / Ohio City Venedocia Road – Ohio City	Eastern terminus of SR 709
Van Wert	Ridge Township	24.91	40.09	SR 697 east / CR 159 (Ringwald Road) – Delphos	Western terminus of SR 697
Van Wert	Van Wert	30.81	49.58	US 127 (South Washington Street) / Fox Road	
1.000 mi = 1.609 km; 1.000 km = 0.621 mi: Concurrency terminus
