= New York State Route 363 (disambiguation) =

New York State Route 363 is a north–south state highway in Binghamton, New York, United States, that was established by 1981.

New York State Route 363 may also refer to:

- New York State Route 363 (1930–1931) in Montgomery County
- New York State Route 363 (1932–1950s) in Monroe County
