= Grand Lake St. Marys Lighthouse =

Lighthouse in Ohio, US

- U.S. National Register of Historic Places
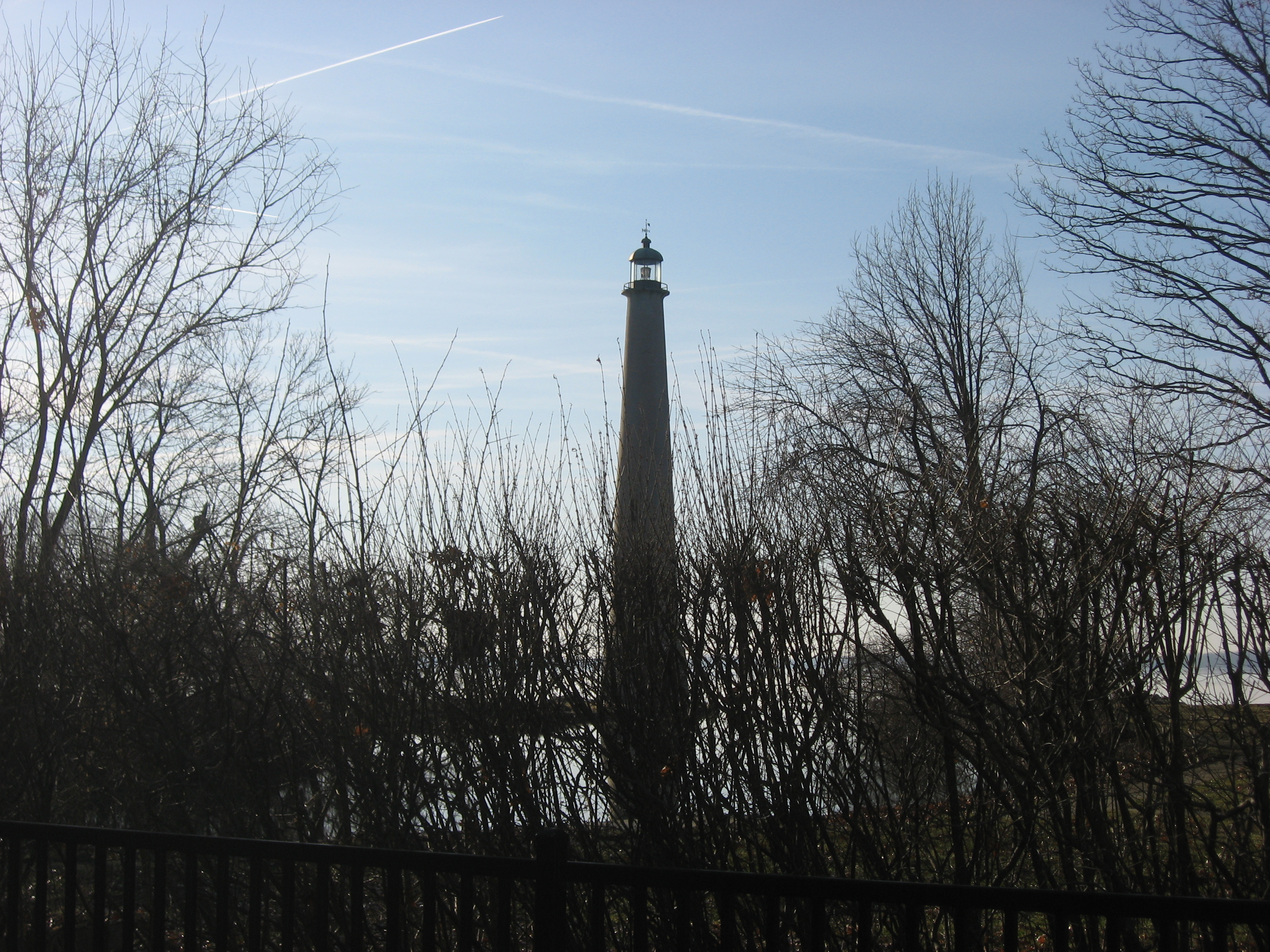
- Roadside view of the lighthouse

- Location within Ohio Location within the United States
- Location: Grand Lake St. Marys-Northwood Addition
- Nearest city: Celina, Ohio
- Coordinates: 40°32′36″N 84°28′53″W
- Area: Less than 1 acre (0.40 ha)
- Built: 1923
- NRHP reference No.: 82003614
- Added to NRHP: June 2, 1982

The Grand Lake St. Marys Lighthouse, also known as the "Northwoods Lighthouse", is a historic lighthouse on Grand Lake St. Marys, a reservoir in the far western part of the U.S. state of Ohio. Located east of the city of Celina in Mercer County, the lighthouse was built in 1923, using a plan modeled after the Eddystone Lighthouse off the coast of Cornwall in the United Kingdom.

== History ==
A predominantly concrete structure, the lighthouse rests on a stone foundation. Measuring 50 feet (15 m) from foundation to pinnacle, it is covered with a dome of bronze and glass that surrounds the beacon; the dome is crowned with a decorative weathervane.

Although the lighthouse was built partially for ornamental purposes, it has also served as an active lighthouse. In its earliest years, it operated in a standard lighthouse role between April and November under a license from the U.S. Coast Guard. Grand Lake St. Marys was built to provide water for the Miami and Erie Canal; although the canal had ceased operations by 1923, there was still sufficient lake traffic to warrant the use of a lighthouse on this peninsula, which protrudes into the northern shore of the lake. Today, it is one of three lighthouses on Grand Lake St. Marys: the Celina Rotary Club erected an operating lighthouse in 1986, at the lake's northwestern corner, and a third lighthouse was completed on the lake's southern shore in 2003. Unlike the other two lighthouses, the Northwoods Lighthouse is completely inaccessible by land, as surrounding property owners have completely blocked public access.

In 1982, the Grand Lake St. Marys Lighthouse was listed on the National Register of Historic Places because of its historically significant architecture. Key to its inclusion was its unusual location — western Ohio is a flat, landlocked region far from major bodies of water. It is the only historic lighthouse in the region, and until the construction of the Rotary Club lighthouse in 1986, there were no other lighthouses in the region at all.
