= Ohio State Route 197 =

State highway in western Ohio, US

State Route 197

Route information
- Maintained by ODOT
- Length: 25.28 mi (40.68 km)
- Existed: 1923–present

Major junctions
- West end: US 127 / SR 29 / SR 703 in Celina
- US 33 near Celina
- East end: SR 198 near Buckland

Location
- Country: United States
- State: Ohio
- Counties: Mercer, Auglaize

Highway system
- Ohio State Highway System; Interstate; US; State; Scenic
← SR 196	→ SR 198

State Route 197 (SR 197) is 25.28-mile (40.68 km) east–west state highway in the western part of the U.S. state of Ohio. The western terminus of SR 197 is at a signalized intersection in downtown Celina that marks the junction of U.S. Route 127 (US 127), SR 29 and SR 703. SR 197 has its eastern terminus at SR 198 nearly 2 miles (3.2 km) southeast of the village of Buckland.

== Route description ==
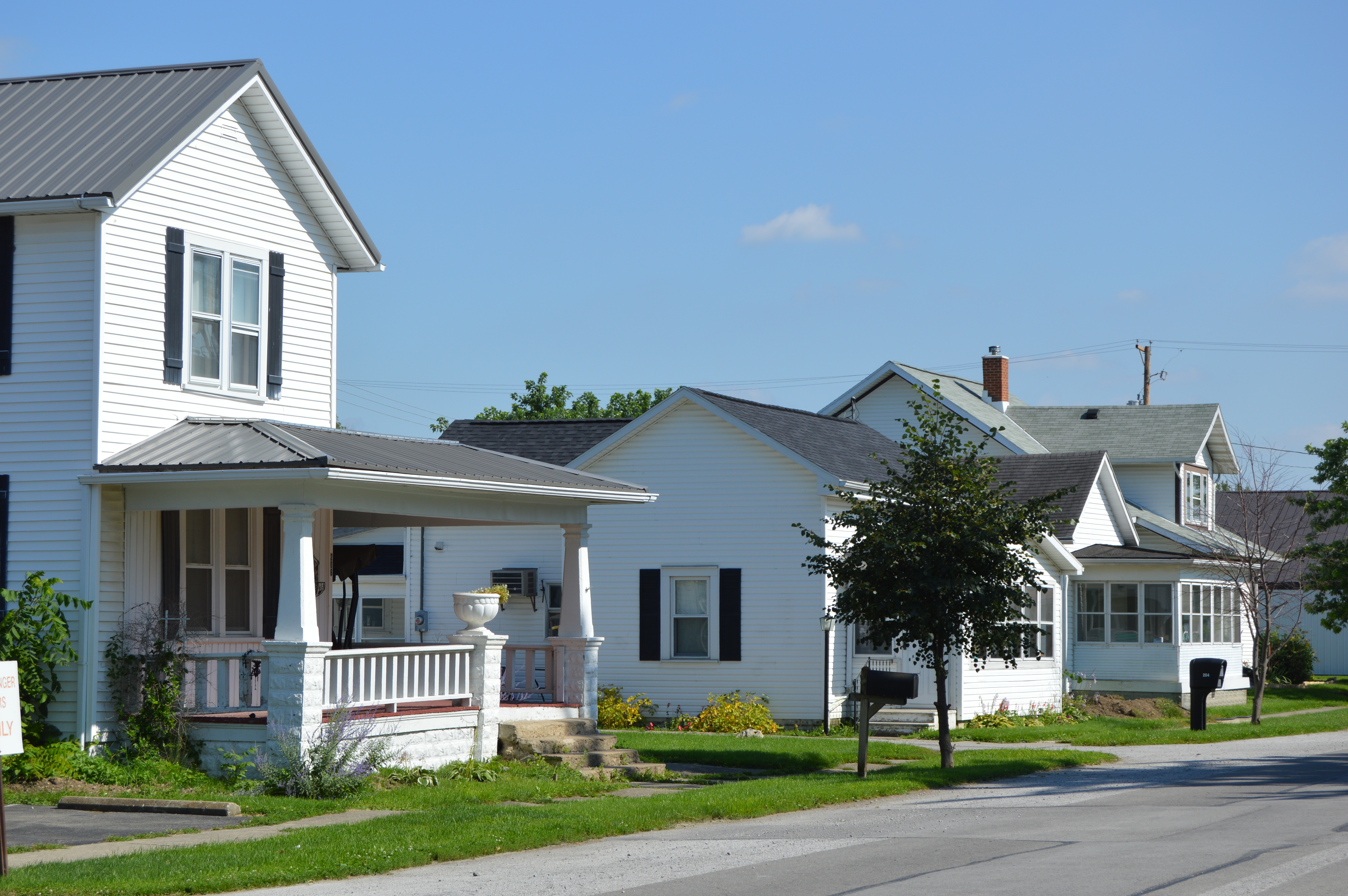
SR 197 as Main Street in Buckland

There are no segments of SR 197 that are included as a part of the National Highway System (NHS). The NHS is a network of highways that are identified as being most important for the economy, mobility and defense of the nation.

The western terminus of SR 197 is at a traffic light between U.S. Route 127 (US 127), SR 29 and SR 703. SR 197 heads north concurrent with US 127, until SR 197 turns to the northeast. The route leaves Celina passing through rural Mercer County. In rural Mercer County the road has an intersection with US 33. The highway heads northeast from US 33 towards SR 66. The road has an intersection with SR 66 and afterwards turns towards southeast. The eastern terminus of the highway is that an intersection with SR 198.

== History ==
The SR 197 designation was applied in 1923. It was originally routed along much of its present alignment, from its western terminus in downtown Celina to its junction with SR 66 south of Spencerville. SR 197 was extended to the east in 1937, routed along previously county-maintained roadways to its current eastern terminus at SR 198.

== Major intersections ==
County	Location	mi	km	Destinations	Notes
Mercer	Celina	0.00	0.00	US 127 south (Main Street) / SR 29 / SR 703 (Market Street)	Southern end of US 127 concurrency
Mercer	Celina	0.27	0.43	US 127 north (North Main Street) / West Wayne Street	Northern end of US 127 concurrency
Mercer	Center Township	6.27	10.09	US 33 – St. Marys, Rockford	
Auglaize	Salem Township	12.38	19.92	SR 116	
Auglaize	Salem Township	16.69	26.86	SR 66 – St. Marys, Spencerville	
Auglaize	Moulton Township	25.28	40.68	SR 198 / Wapakoneta-Buckland Road	
1.000 mi = 1.609 km; 1.000 km = 0.621 mi: Concurrency terminus
