= Montezuma, Ohio =

- Village
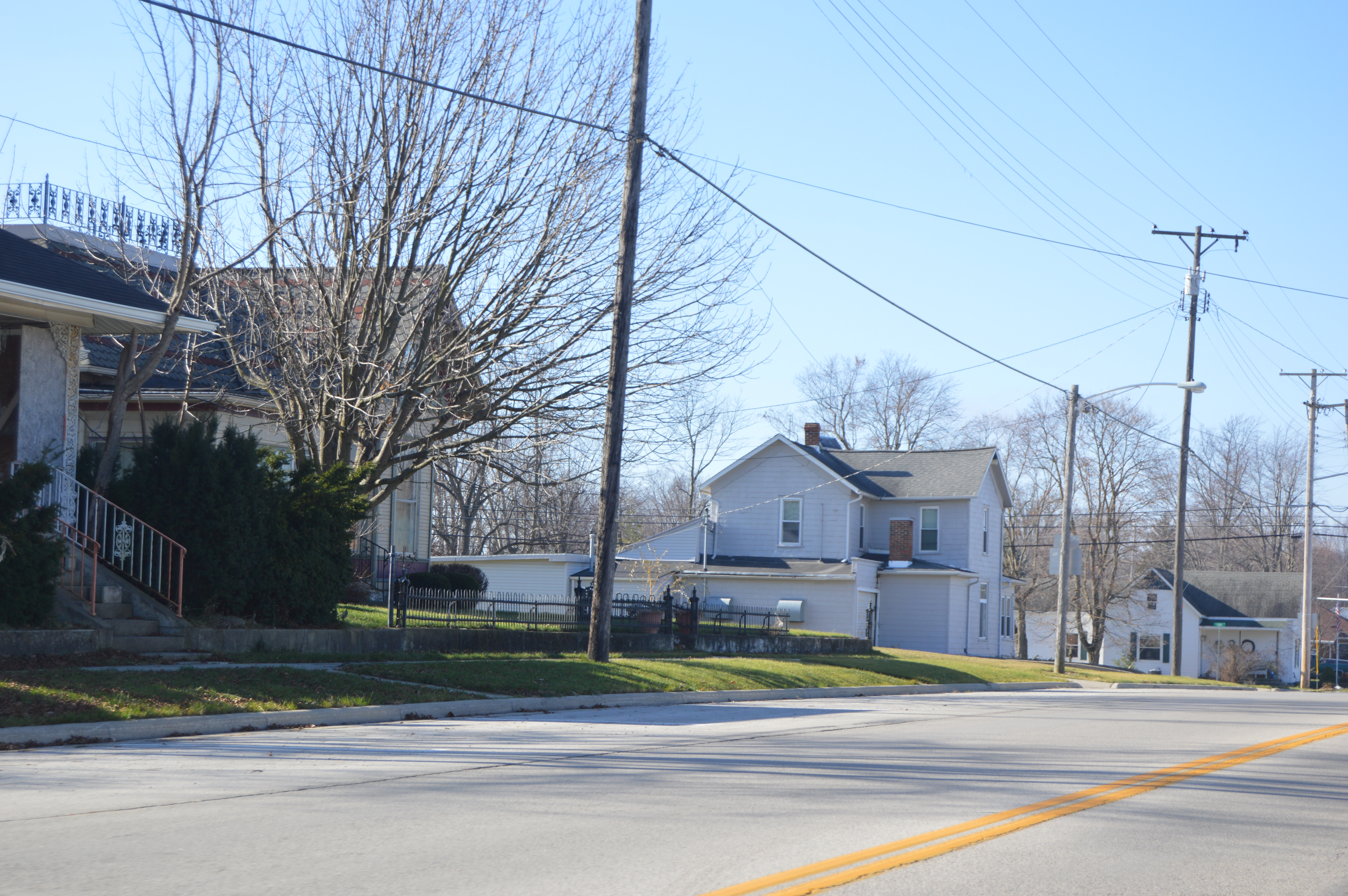
- Main Street

- Location in Mercer County and the state of Ohio.
- Coordinates: 40°29′21″N 84°32′59″W
- Country: United States
- State: Ohio
- County: Mercer
- Township: Franklin

Area
  - Total: 0.10 sq mi (0.27 km^{2})
  - Land: 0.10 sq mi (0.26 km^{2})
  - Water: 0.0039 sq mi (0.01 km^{2})
- Elevation: 876 ft (267 m)

Population (2020)
  - Total: 152
  - Density: 1,490/sq mi (575/km^{2})
- Time zone: UTC-5 (Eastern (EST))
  - Summer (DST): UTC-4 (EDT)
- ZIP code: 45866
- Area code: 419
- FIPS code: 39-51674
- GNIS feature ID: 2399386

Montezuma is a village in Mercer County, Ohio, United States. The population was 152 at the 2020 census.

== History ==
Montezuma was laid out and platted in 1835. The village was named after Montezuma of Mexico. A post office has been in operation at Montezuma since 1840. The village was incorporated in 1894.

== Geography ==
According to the United States Census Bureau, the village has a total area of 0.13 square miles (0.34 km^{2}), of which 0.12 square miles (0.31 km^{2}) is land and 0.01 square miles (0.03 km^{2}) is water.

Montezuma is located near Grand Lake St. Marys.

== Demographics ==
Historical population
Census	Pop.	Note	%±
1900	317		—
1910	228		−28.1%
1920	175		−23.2%
1930	192		9.7%
1940	232		20.8%
1950	299		28.9%
1960	287		−4.0%
1970	260		−9.4%
1980	200		−23.1%
1990	199		−0.5%
2000	191		−4.0%
2010	165		−13.6%
2020	152		−7.9%
U.S. Decennial Census

=== 2010 census ===
As of the census of 2010, there were 165 people, 74 households, and 48 families living in the village. The population density was 1,375.0 inhabitants per square mile (530.9/km^{2}). There were 89 housing units at an average density of 741.7 per square mile (286.4/km^{2}). The racial makeup of the village was 99.4% White and 0.6% from two or more races. Hispanic or Latino of any race were 1.2% of the population.

There were 74 households, of which 16.2% had children under the age of 18 living with them, 44.6% were married couples living together, 8.1% had a female householder with no husband present, 12.2% had a male householder with no wife present, and 35.1% were non-families. 28.4% of all households were made up of individuals, and 6.8% had someone living alone who was 65 years of age or older. The average household size was 2.23 and the average family size was 2.67.

The median age in the village was 44.3 years. 13.9% of residents were under the age of 18; 13.9% were between the ages of 18 and 24; 23% were from 25 to 44; 37% were from 45 to 64; and 12.1% were 65 years of age or older. The gender makeup of the village was 52.7% male and 47.3% female.

=== 2000 census ===
As of the census of 2000, there were 191 people, 71 households, and 48 families living in the village. The population density was 1,660.7 inhabitants per square mile (641.2/km^{2}). There were 80 housing units at an average density of 695.6 per square mile (268.6/km^{2}). The racial makeup of the village was 98.43% White, and 1.57% from two or more races. Hispanic or Latino of any race were 1.57% of the population.

There were 71 households, out of which 35.2% had children under the age of 18 living with them, 54.9% were married couples living together, 9.9% had a female householder with no husband present, and 31.0% were non-families. 23.9% of all households were made up of individuals, and 12.7% had someone living alone who was 65 years of age or older. The average household size was 2.69 and the average family size was 3.12.

In the village, the population was spread out, with 28.8% under the age of 18, 11.0% from 18 to 24, 24.6% from 25 to 44, 19.9% from 45 to 64, and 15.7% who were 65 years of age or older. The median age was 38 years. For every 100 females there were 87.3 males. For every 100 females age 18 and over, there were 83.8 males.

The median income for a household in the village was $41,094, and the median income for a family was $48,750. Males had a median income of $31,250 versus $19,583 for females. The per capita income for the village was $17,917. About 2.6% of families and 10.3% of the population were below the poverty line, including 10.0% of those under the age of eighteen and none of those 65 or over.
