= Grand Lake St. Marys Seaplane Base =

- IATA: none; ICAO: none; FAA LID: O12

Summary
- Airport type: Public
- Owner: Ohio Division of Parks & Recreation
- Serves: St. Marys, Ohio
- Location: Auglaize County, Ohio
- Time zone: UTC−05:00 (-5)
  - Summer (DST): UTC−04:00 (-4)
- Elevation AMSL: 871 ft (265 m)
- Coordinates: 40°32′28″N 084°29′26″W

Map
- Location of airport in Ohio O12 (the United States)

Runways
Direction	Length		Surface
Direction	ft	m	Surface
9/27	7,000	2,134	Water

Statistics (2022)
- Aircraft Movements: 12
- Source: Federal Aviation Administration

Grand Lake St. Marys Seaplane Base (FAA LID: O12) is a public use seaplane base located five nautical miles (9 km) southwest of the central business district of St. Marys, a city in Auglaize County, Ohio, United States. It is owned by the Ohio Division of Parks & Recreation and is located on Grand Lake St. Marys, a lake and state park in Ohio. The airport is a significant meeting place for the Ohio Seaplane Pilots Association.

In 2016, the State of Ohio announced plans to expand the lake to allow more seaplane operations. The State of Ohio also announced plans to designate more lakes as seaplane bases for open use.

== Facilities and aircraft ==
Grand Lake St. Marys Seaplane Base covers an area of 643 acres (260 ha) at an elevation of 871 feet (265 m) above mean sea level. It has one seaplane landing area designated 9/27 and measuring 7,000 x 4,000 ft (2,134 x 1,219 m).

The airport does not have a fixed-base operator, though avgas is available.

For the 12-month period ending September 27, 2022, the airport has 12 aircraft operations per year, all general aviation.

== See also ==
- List of airports in Ohio
