= Saint Marys Township, Auglaize County, Ohio =

Township in Ohio, US

Coordinates: 40°37′10″N 84°21′33″W

- Township
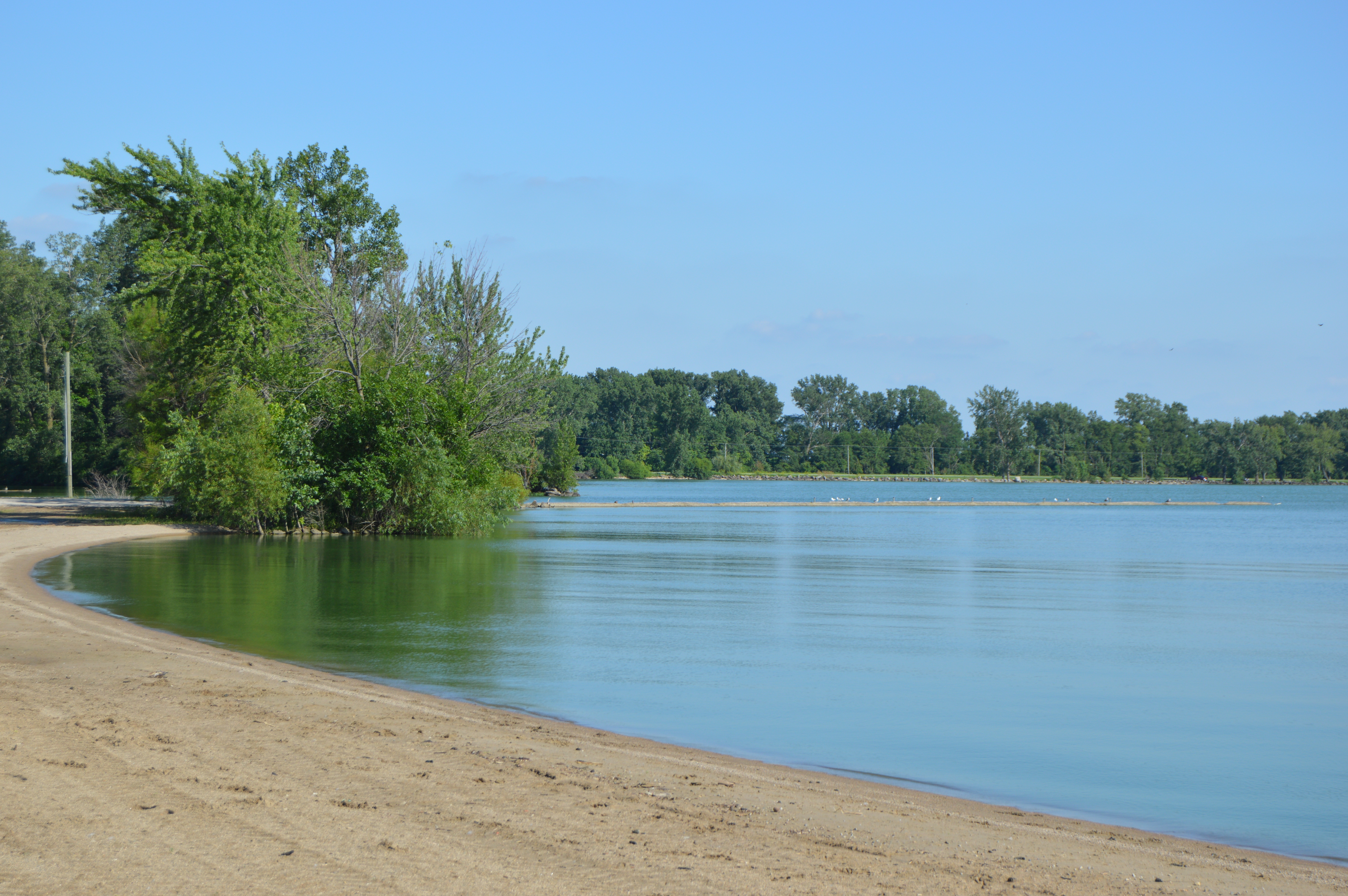
- Grand Lake St Marys shoreline

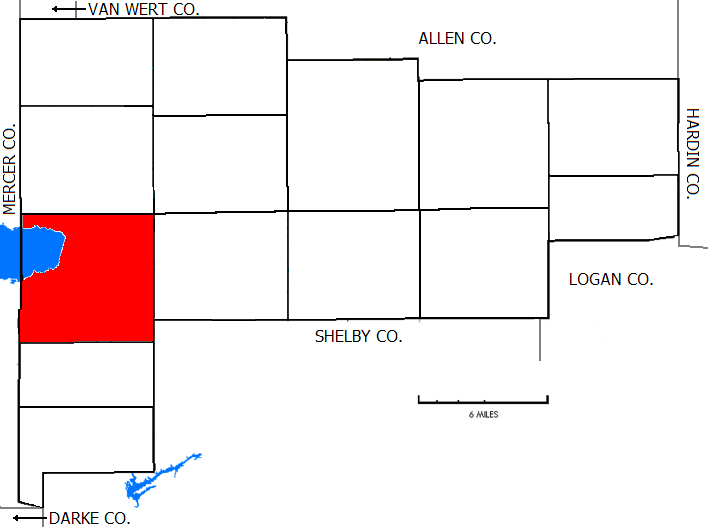
- Location of Saint Marys Township in Auglaize County
- Country: United States
- State: Ohio
- County: Auglaize

Area
  - Total: 36.8 sq mi (95 km^{2})

Population (2020)
  - Total: 11,065
  - Density: 301/sq mi (116/km^{2})
- Time zone: UTC-5 (Eastern (EST))
  - Summer (DST): UTC-4 (EDT)

Saint Marys Township is one of the fourteen townships of Auglaize County, Ohio, United States. The 2020 census found 11,065 people in the township.

== Geography ==
Located in the western part of the county, it borders the following townships:

- Noble Township - north
- Moulton Township - northeast corner
- Washington Township - east
- Van Buren Township, Shelby County - southeast
- German Township - south
- Franklin Township, Mercer County - west
- Jefferson Township, Mercer County - northwest

Most of the city of St. Marys is located in northern Saint Marys Township, and the eastern end of Grand Lake St. Marys and its respective state park are located in the western part of the township.

Saint Marys Township is crossed by the St. Marys River, a tributary of the Maumee River. According to the U.S. Census Bureau, the total area of the township is 36.9 square miles (95.6 km^{2}).

== Name and history ==
It is the only Saint Marys Township statewide.

Originally part of Mercer County, the township was formed in 1824.

== Government ==
The township is governed by a three-member board of trustees, who are elected in November of odd-numbered years to a four-year term beginning on the following January 1. Two are elected in the year after the presidential election and one is elected in the year before it. There is also an elected township fiscal officer, who serves a four-year term beginning on April 1 of the year after the election, which is held in November of the year before the presidential election. Vacancies in the fiscal officership or on the board of trustees are filled by the remaining trustees.

== Public services ==
The northern portion of the township is served by the Saint Marys (45885) post office, with the southern portions being split between the New Bremen (45869) and the New Knoxville (45871) post offices.

The majority of the township is in the Saint Marys City School District with the southern portions being split between the New Bremen Local School District and the New Knoxville Local School District. Saint Marys' high school is St. Marys Memorial High School.
