= Lake Loramie State Park =

Park in Ohio, USA

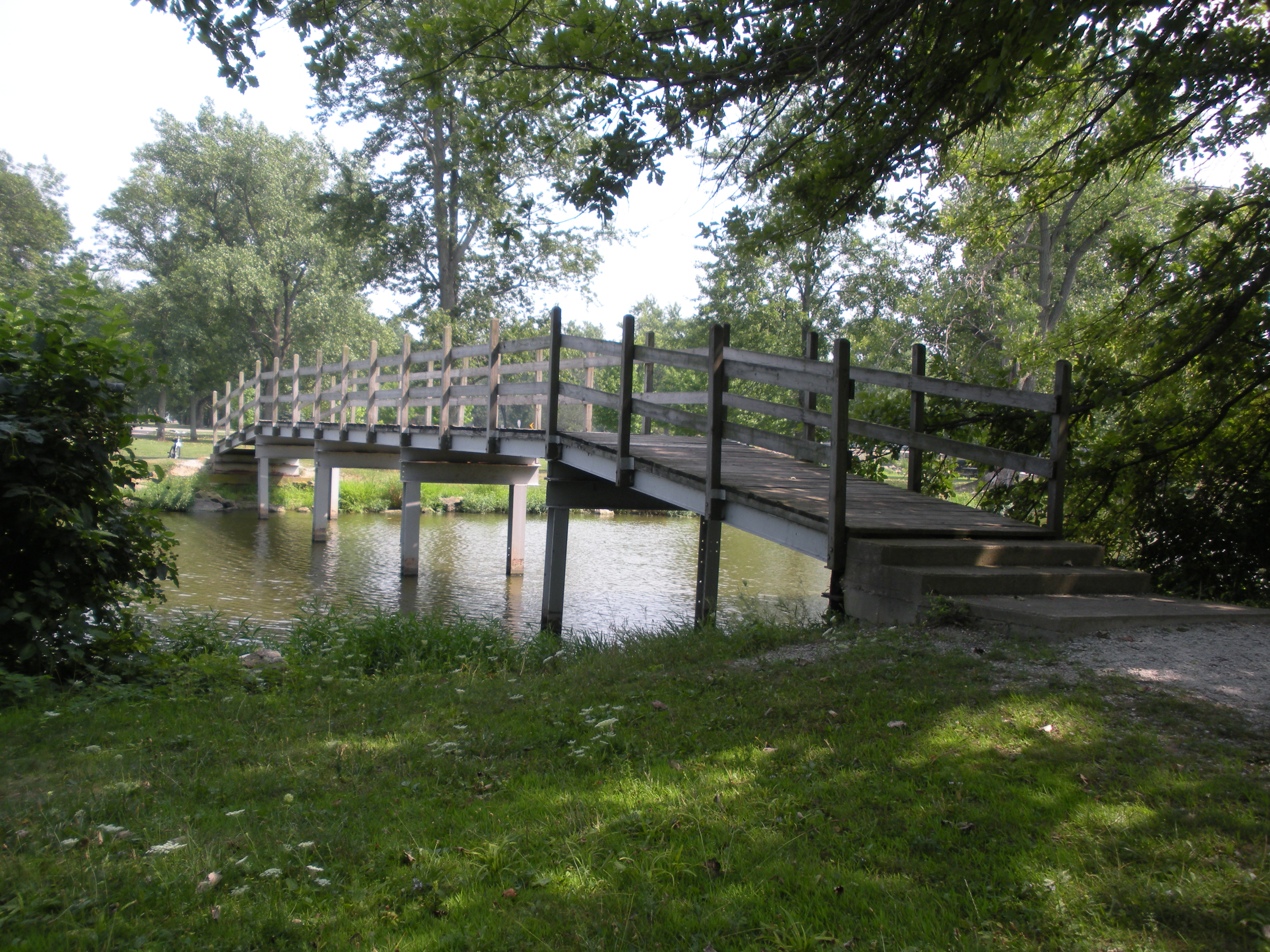
- The Lake Loramie Bridge

- Location within Ohio Location within the United States
- Location: Shelby and Auglaize counties, Ohio, United States
- Coordinates: 40°22′20″N 84°20′16″W
- Area: Land: 407 acres (165 ha); Water: 1,655 acres (670 ha)
- Elevation: 958 ft (292 m)
- Established: 1949
- Administrator: Ohio Department of Natural Resources
- Designation: Ohio state park
- Website: Lake Loramie State Park

Lake Loramie State Park is a public recreation area located on the northeast side of Fort Loramie, Ohio. It occupies 407 acres (165 ha) on 1,655-acre (670 ha) Lake Loramie and is operated by the Ohio Department of Natural Resources.

== History ==
Lake Loramie was named after French-Canadian trader Pierre-Louis de Lorimier (Anglicized to Peter Loramie), who established a trading post at the mouth of Loramie Creek in 1769. Lake Loramie was constructed in 1844–45 as a storage reservoir supplying water to the Miami-Erie Canal system. In 1949, Lake Loramie was turned over the Division of Parks and Recreation of the Ohio Department of Natural Resources.

== Recreation ==
The park offers fishing, boating, camping, and cabins. Crappie, bluegill, channel catfish, bullheads, carp, and largemouth bass can be found in the lake.
