= Fort Loramie, Ohio =

- Village
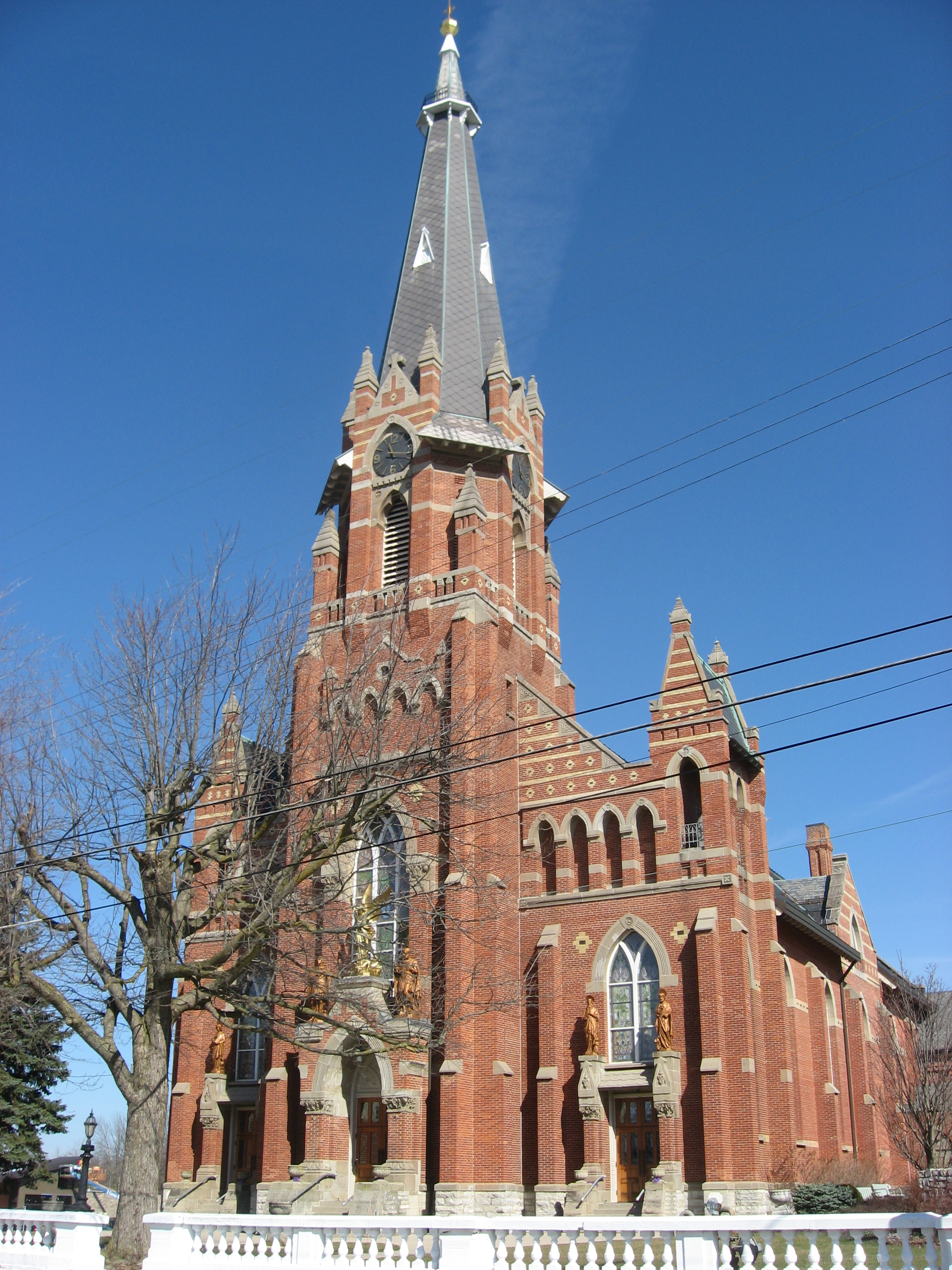
- St. Michael's Catholic Church, a community landmark

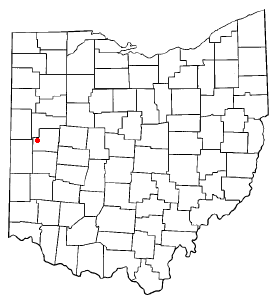
- Location of Fort Loramie, Ohio

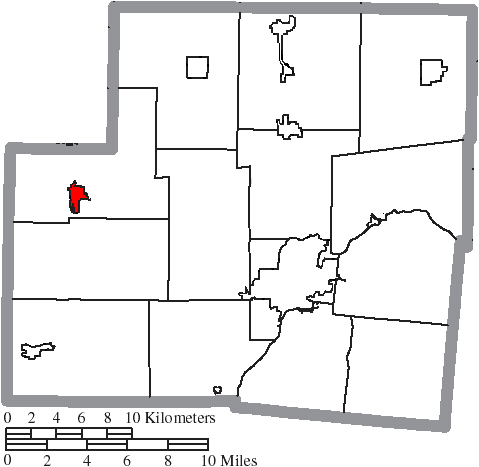
- Location of Fort Loramie in Shelby County
- Coordinates: 40°20′53″N 84°22′14″W
- Country: United States
- State: Ohio
- County: Shelby
- Founded: 1837

Government
  - Mayor: Randy Ahlers

Area
  - Total: 1.03 sq mi (2.67 km^{2})
  - Land: 1.03 sq mi (2.67 km^{2})
  - Water: 0 sq mi (0.00 km^{2})
- Elevation: 953 ft (290 m)

Population (2020)
  - Total: 1,590
  - Estimate (2023): 1,586
  - Density: 1,541.4/sq mi (595.14/km^{2})
- Time zone: UTC-5 (EST)
  - Summer (DST): UTC-4 (EDT)
- ZIP code: 45845
- Area codes: 937, 326
- FIPS code: 39-27832
- GNIS feature ID: 2398903
- Website: https://www.fortloramie.com/

Fort Loramie is a village in Shelby County, Ohio, United States, along Loramie Creek, a tributary of the Great Miami River in southwestern Ohio. It is 42 miles north-northwest of Dayton and 20 miles east of the Ohio/Indiana border. The population was 1,590 at the 2020 census. The village was founded in 1837 near the former site of a colonial fort of the same name.

== History ==
Fort Loramie was established as a fur trading post in 1769 by Pierre-Louis de Lorimier (usually anglicized to Peter Loramie), a French-Canadian fur trader, British Indian agent and Shawnee agitator, and his father. The Shawnee used the trading post as a staging area for attacks against Americans during the Revolutionary War. During a raid on the Shawnee by George Rogers Clark in Nov. 1782, the trading post was attacked by a detachment of 150 men under Col. Benjamin Logan and burned to the ground. Lorimier escaped and fled west across the Mississippi. The site remained abandoned until 1795.

After victory at Battle of Fallen Timbers in Aug. 1794, which ended the Northwest Indian War, General "Mad" Anthony Wayne ordered a fort built at the site as a supply depot for Fort Adams, Fort Defiance, and Fort Wayne. It was originally a stockade, but Wayne decided that a blockhouse and storage buildings were more vital. Construction was completed in Dec. 1795. The fort stood on the portage between St. Mary's River and Loramie Creek a half mile north of the present town. It was used as one of the demarcation points in the Treaty of Greenville Aug. 1795. The site was also mentioned in the Treaty of Fort Meigs 1817.

During the War of 1812, Fort Loramie served as a supply depot for forts in northern Ohio, and as a waystation for expeditions against the British in Michigan and Canada. The last officer who had command there was a Capt. Butler, a nephew of Gen. Richard Butler who died at St. Clair's Defeat in 1791. In 1815, the United States sold the fort to James Furrow, who constructed a post office and tavern out of the buildings. The business had closed by 1820, but a small settlement had grown up around the site. The site today is a farm belonging to the heirs of James Furrow. Nothing remains of the fort or trading post.

Later, a town was laid out nearby and surveyed by Jonathan Counts in 1837. Lots were sold at auction, and the name Berlin was given to the town. Most of the early settlers were German. In 1911, the name of the town was changed to Fort Loramie.

Between 1836 and 1841, the Miami and Erie Canal was built intersecting the town. Canal boats hauled the limestone for the foundation of St. Michael’s Church, built by German Catholic settlers starting in 1849. A log church building from 1838 had preceded the stone and brick church. It was rebuilt again in 1881.

The settlement languished in the early years: the first flour mill and a general store, Willman's, were built in 1858. Other early businesses were Bruckens and Vogelsang's Cafe.

With the encroachment of railroads, the canal ceased operation in 1909. One relic is Loramie Lake, the reservoir used to keep the canal filled with water.

A large part of the town was destroyed in the Great Flood of 1913.

== Geography ==
According to the United States Census Bureau, the village has a total area of 0.96 square miles (2.49 km^{2}), all land. The village is at an elevation of 953 feet (290 m) above sea level.

== Demographics ==
Historical population
| Census | Pop. | Note | %± |
|---|---|---|---|
| 1890 | 457 | | — |
| 1900 | 444 | | −2.8% |
| 1910 | 489 | | 10.1% |
| 1920 | 472 | | −3.5% |
| 1930 | 427 | | −9.5% |
| 1940 | 507 | | 18.7% |
| 1950 | 508 | | 0.2% |
| 1960 | 687 | | 35.2% |
| 1970 | 744 | | 8.3% |
| 1980 | 977 | | 31.3% |
| 1990 | 1,042 | | 6.7% |
| 2000 | 1,344 | | 29.0% |
| 2010 | 1,478 | | 10.0% |
| 2020 | 1,590 | | 7.6% |
| 2023 (est.) | 1,586 | ▼ | −0.3% |
U.S. Decennial Census

=== 2000 census ===
As of the census of 2000, there were 1,344 people, 480 households, and 358 families living in the village. The population density was 1,848.7 inhabitants per square mile (713.8/km^{2}). There were 494 housing units at an average density of 679.5 per square mile (262.4/km^{2}). The racial makeup of the village was 99.70% White, and 0.30% from two or more races. Hispanic or Latino of any race were 0.37% of the population.

There were 480 households, out of which 40.4% had children under the age of 18 living with them, 68.3% were married couples living together, 4.0% had a female householder with no husband present, and 25.4% were non-families. 22.7% of all households were made up of individuals, and 11.0% had someone living alone who was 65 years of age or older. The average household size was 2.80 and the average family size was 3.35.

In the village, the population was spread out, with 31.0% under the age of 18, 7.4% from 18 to 24, 31.2% from 25 to 44, 16.9% from 45 to 64, and 13.5% who were 65 years of age or older. The median age was 33 years. For every 100 females there were 95.1 males. For every 100 females age 18 and over, there were 97.4 males.

The median income for a household in the village was $54,750, and the median income for a family was $65,089. Males had a median income of $39,934 versus $27,039 for females. The per capita income for the village was $19,602. About 0.9% of families and 1.4% of the population were below the poverty line, including 0.2% of those under age 18 and 5.4% of those age 65 or over.

=== 2010 census ===
As of the census of 2010, there were 1,478 people, 530 households, and 396 families living in the village. The population density was 1,539.6 inhabitants per square mile (594.4/km^{2}). There were 564 housing units at an average density of 587.5 per square mile (226.8/km^{2}). The racial makeup of the village was 99.7% White, 0.1% African American, 0.1% Asian, and 0.1% from two or more races. Hispanic or Latino of any race were 0.4% of the population.

There were 530 households, of which 40.4% had children under the age of 18 living with them, 65.8% were married couples living together, 6.2% had a female householder with no husband present, 2.6% had a male householder with no wife present, and 25.3% were non-families. 22.6% of all households were made up of individuals, and 11.9% had someone living alone who was 65 years of age or older. The average household size was 2.79 and the average family size was 3.32.

The median age in the village was 35 years. 31.1% of residents were under the age of 18; 6.5% were between the ages of 18 and 24; 26.1% were from 25 to 44; 21.7% were from 45 to 64; and 14.6% were 65 years of age or older. The gender makeup of the village was 49.0% male and 51.0% female.

== Culture ==
Fort Loramie is home to an annual three-day-long festival in the summer, Country Concert, which attracts thousands of people from around the United States and Canada. The yearly concert fest is located at Hickory Hill Lake located south of the village near the neighboring rural community of Newport.

== Recreation ==
Lake Loramie State Park is located just north of town and offers fishing and boating on the 1655 acre lake and 407 acre grounds.

== Education ==
Fort Loramie has one public high school, Fort Loramie High School, and one public grade school, Fort Loramie Elementary.

The school also allows students to enroll into Upper Valley Career Center, a trade school in Piqua, Ohio.

Fort Loramie has a public library, a branch of Shelby County Libraries.

== Media ==
Fort Loramie is served by one local daily newspaper, the Sidney Daily News, along with a few weekly newspapers.

== Notable people ==
- Jared Hoying, professional baseball player
