= National Register of Historic Places listings in Shelby County, Ohio =

Location of Shelby County in Ohio

This is a list of the National Register of Historic Places listings in Shelby County, Ohio.

This is intended to be a complete list of the properties and districts on the National Register of Historic Places in Shelby County, Ohio, United States. The locations of National Register properties and districts for which the latitude and longitude coordinates are included below, may be seen in an online map.

There are 20 properties and districts listed on the National Register in the county, including 1 National Historic Landmark. Another property was once listed but has been removed.

This National Park Service list is complete through NPS recent listings posted August 28, 2026.

== Current listings ==
	Name on the Register	Image	Date listed	Location	City or town	Description
1	Anna Town Hall	Anna Town Hall	September 20, 1978 (#78002187)	209 W. Main St. 40°23′41″N 84°10′33″W	Anna	
2	Botkins Elementary School	Botkins Elementary School	July 26, 1979 (#79002851)	Main St. 40°28′08″N 84°10′57″W	Botkins	
3	Emanuel Lutheran Church of Montra	Emanuel Lutheran Church of Montra	May 13, 1982 (#82003640)	Montra Rd. in Montra; 40°25′54″N 84°05′35″W	Jackson Township	
4	Fulton Farm	Fulton Farm	May 8, 1979 (#79001947)	804 S. Brooklyn Ave. 40°16′34″N 84°08′55″W	Sidney	
5	Immaculate Conception Rectory at Botkins	Immaculate Conception Rectory at Botkins	July 26, 1979 (#79002876)	116 N. Mill St. 40°28′09″N 84°10′28″W	Botkins	
6	Zenas King Bowstring Bridge		November 29, 2021 (#100007183)	Benjamin Trail, Amos Lake, Tawawa Park; 40°17′19″N 84°07′40″W	Sidney	
7	Lockington Covered Bridge	Lockington Covered Bridge	June 10, 1975 (#75001532)	1 mile east of Lockington on State Route 132; 40°12′36″N 84°12′53″W	Orange and Washington Townships	Burned circa 1989
8	Lockington Locks Historical Area	Lockington Locks Historical Area	December 17, 1969 (#69000147)	Miami and Erie Canal between Lockington and Washington Township; 40°12′34″N 84°14′38″W	Lockington and Washington Township	Extends into Washington Township in Miami County
9	People's Federal Savings and Loan Association	People's Federal Savings and Loan Association	June 5, 1972 (#72001042)	101 E. Court St. 40°17′02″N 84°09′24″W	Sidney	Designed by Louis Sullivan, 1917; still an operating thrift
10	Port Jefferson School	Port Jefferson School	June 2, 1982 (#82003641)	Wall and Spring Sts. 40°19′48″N 84°05′33″W	Port Jefferson	
11	Sacred Heart of Jesus Rectory	Sacred Heart of Jesus Rectory	July 26, 1979 (#79002874)	State Routes 29 and 119 at McCartyville; 40°23′42″N 84°15′17″W	Van Buren Township	
12	St. Michael Catholic Church Complex	St. Michael Catholic Church Complex	July 26, 1979 (#79002825)	State Route 705 east of State Route 66; 40°21′05″N 84°22′19″W	Fort Loramie	
13	St. Patrick Catholic Church and Rectory	St. Patrick Catholic Church and Rectory	July 26, 1979 (#79002836)	Hoying and Wright-Puthoff Rds. in St. Patrick; 40°22′13″N 84°17′19″W	Van Buren Township	
14	St. Remy Catholic Church	St. Remy Catholic Church	July 26, 1979 (#79002834)	Main St. and Russia-Versailles Rd. 40°14′01″N 84°24′53″W	Russia	
15	Shelby House	Shelby House	December 8, 1978 (#78002188)	403 W. State St. 40°28′02″N 84°11′13″W	Botkins	
16	Sidney Courthouse Square Historic District	Sidney Courthouse Square Historic District	September 27, 1980 (#80003232)	Roughly bounded by North and South Sts. and West and Miami Aves. 40°17′06″N 84°09′21″W	Sidney	
17	Sidney Walnut Avenue Historic District	Sidney Walnut Avenue Historic District	December 29, 1983 (#83004338)	Walnut Ave. from Poplar to Michigan Sts., and 228, 228½, and 238 W. North St. 40°17′12″N 84°09′37″W	Sidney	
18	Sidney Waterworks and Electric Light Building	Sidney Waterworks and Electric Light Building	December 29, 1978 (#78002190)	121 N. Brooklyn Ave. 40°17′07″N 84°08′56″W	Sidney	
19	Whitby Mansion	Whitby Mansion	December 12, 1976 (#76001526)	429 N. Ohio Ave. 40°17′26″N 84°09′26″W	Sidney	
20	Wilson-Lenox House	Wilson-Lenox House	March 27, 1980 (#80003233)	West of Sidney at 9804 Houston Rd. 40°15′21″N 84°14′55″W	Washington Township	

== Former listing ==
	Name on the Register	Image	Date listed	Date removed	Location	City or town	Description
1	Turtle Creek Culvert and Embankment	Turtle Creek Culvert and Embankment	August 10, 1978 (#78002189)	October 29, 1985	West of New Bern; 40°15′01″N 84°14′56″W	New Bern	

== See also ==
- List of National Historic Landmarks in Ohio
- Listings in neighboring counties: Auglaize, Champaign, Darke, Logan, Mercer, Miami
- National Register of Historic Places listings in Ohio
