= McCartyville, Ohio =

Unincorporated community in Ohio, U.S.

McCartyville (also McCarthyville) is an unincorporated community in Shelby County, Ohio, United States. Located at the junction of State Routes 29 and 119, it lies in southern Van Buren Township, 3 miles (4.8 km) south of central Kettlersville and approximately 8 miles (13 km) northwest of the city of Sidney, the county seat of Shelby County. Its elevation is 974 feet (297 m), and it is located at 40°23′41″N 84°15′21″W.

McCartyville was founded during the mid-19th century, at the same time as the nearby settlement of St. Patrick. Settlers in both areas, who were heavily Catholic, decided to split social functions between the two communities: their church was in St. Patrick, and their post office was in McCartyville. This post office was established as the "Reservoir Post Post Office" on 3 October 1876, but the name was changed to "McCartyville Post Office" on 26 July of the following year. Mary Drees managed the post office in McCartyville around the turn of the 20th century. After its closure on 30 June 1904, the residents' mail went through the Anna post office.

One McCartyville building—the rectory at Sacred Heart Catholic Church—is listed on the National Register of Historic Places. Built in 1911, it serves as the residence for priests at the church, which separated from the church in St. Patrick in 1882. McCartyville is located at the easternmost end of the Land of the Cross-Tipped Churches.
