= Tawawa =

Tawawa may refer to:

- Tawawa, Ohio, unincorporated community in Green Township, Shelby County, Ohio
- Tawawa House, an opera written by Zenobia Powell Perry

== See also ==
- Tawawa on Monday a Japanese collection of illustrations by Kiseki Himura
