= Montra, Ohio =

Unincorporated community in Ohio, U.S.

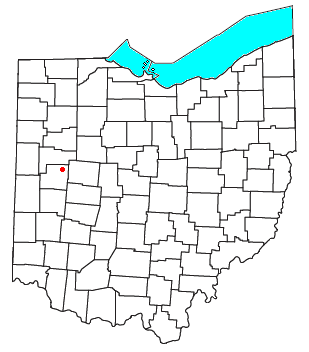
Location of Montra, Ohio

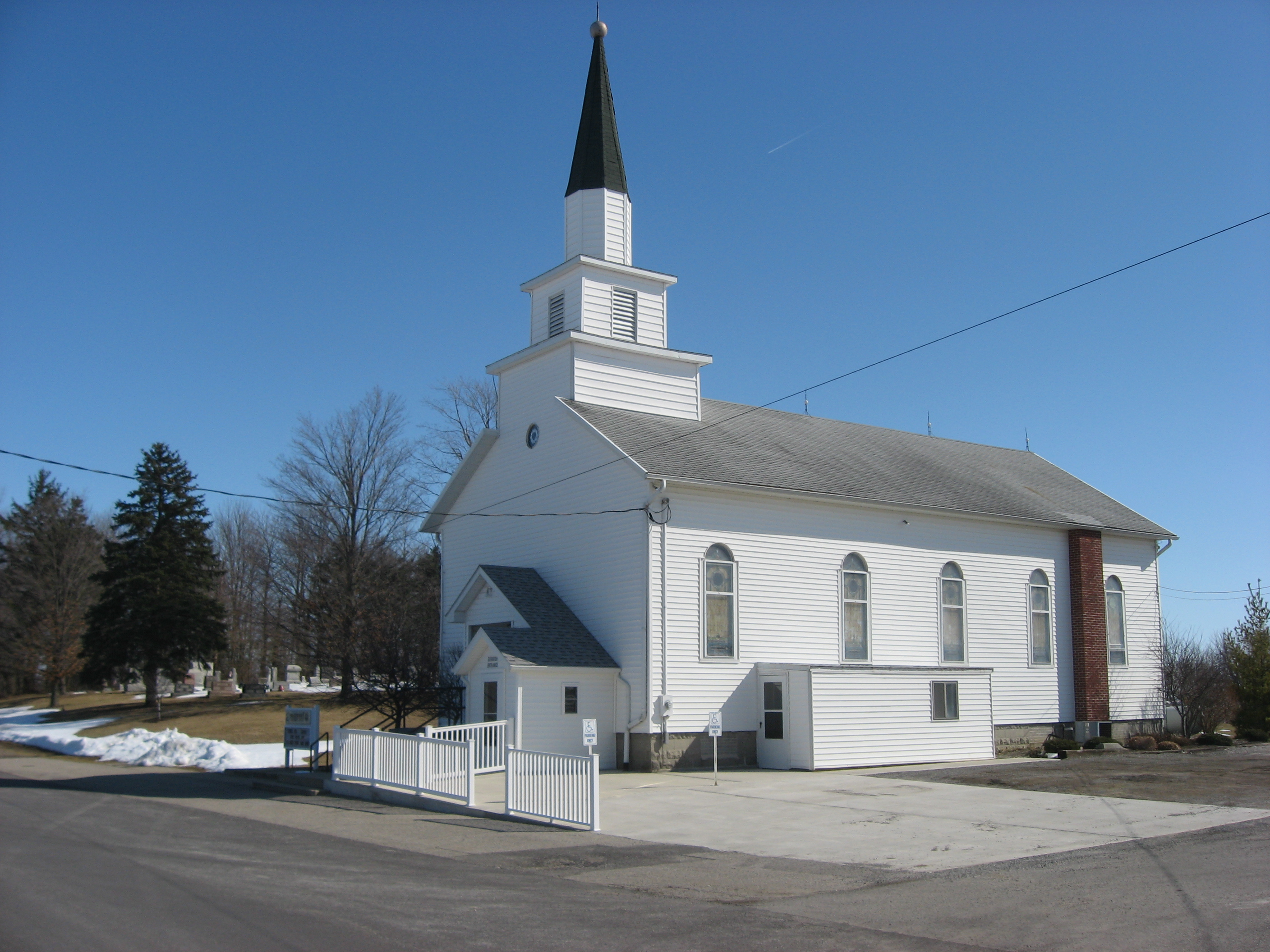
Emanuel Lutheran Church in Montra

Montra (also Monstra) is an unincorporated community in Jackson Township, Shelby County, Ohio, United States. Established in the middle of the nineteenth century, the small community is prominent because of a landmark church, Emanuel Lutheran Church of Montra.

== Geography ==
Montra's elevation is 1,047 feet (319 m), and it is located at 40°25′55″N 84°5′42″W, in one of the hilliest portions of generally flat Shelby County. It lies at the intersection of Montra and Pasco-Montra Roads, one mile south of State Route 274 and in the middle of a triangle formed by the villages of Anna, Botkins, and Jackson Center.

== History ==
Montra was platted in 1849 by landowners Isaac and William Mahuren; surveying was completed on May 22, and the plat was filed on June 30. Houses and businesses quickly sprang up in the community, including a hotel, a blacksmith's shop, and a liquor store. A small school was founded in the village, and a post office was established on February 27, 1850. Two churches, one Lutheran and one Methodist, were founded in 1860 and in the winter of 1864–1865 respectively. In the early 1880s, the community comprised approximately forty houses and had an estimated population of 150 residents.

Today, Montra has shrunk from its height in the late nineteenth century. Since the closure of the community's post office on September 30, 1903, its mail has gone through the Anna post office, and the village of Jackson Center is now the largest community in Jackson Township. A cemetery remains of the Methodist church, but the Emanuel Lutheran Church is still active. The church, a landmark on the community's eastern edge, was listed on the National Register of Historic Places in 1982.
