= Sacred Heart Catholic Church (McCartyville, Ohio) =

Historic church in Ohio, United States

- Sacred Heart of Jesus Rectory
- U.S. National Register of Historic Places
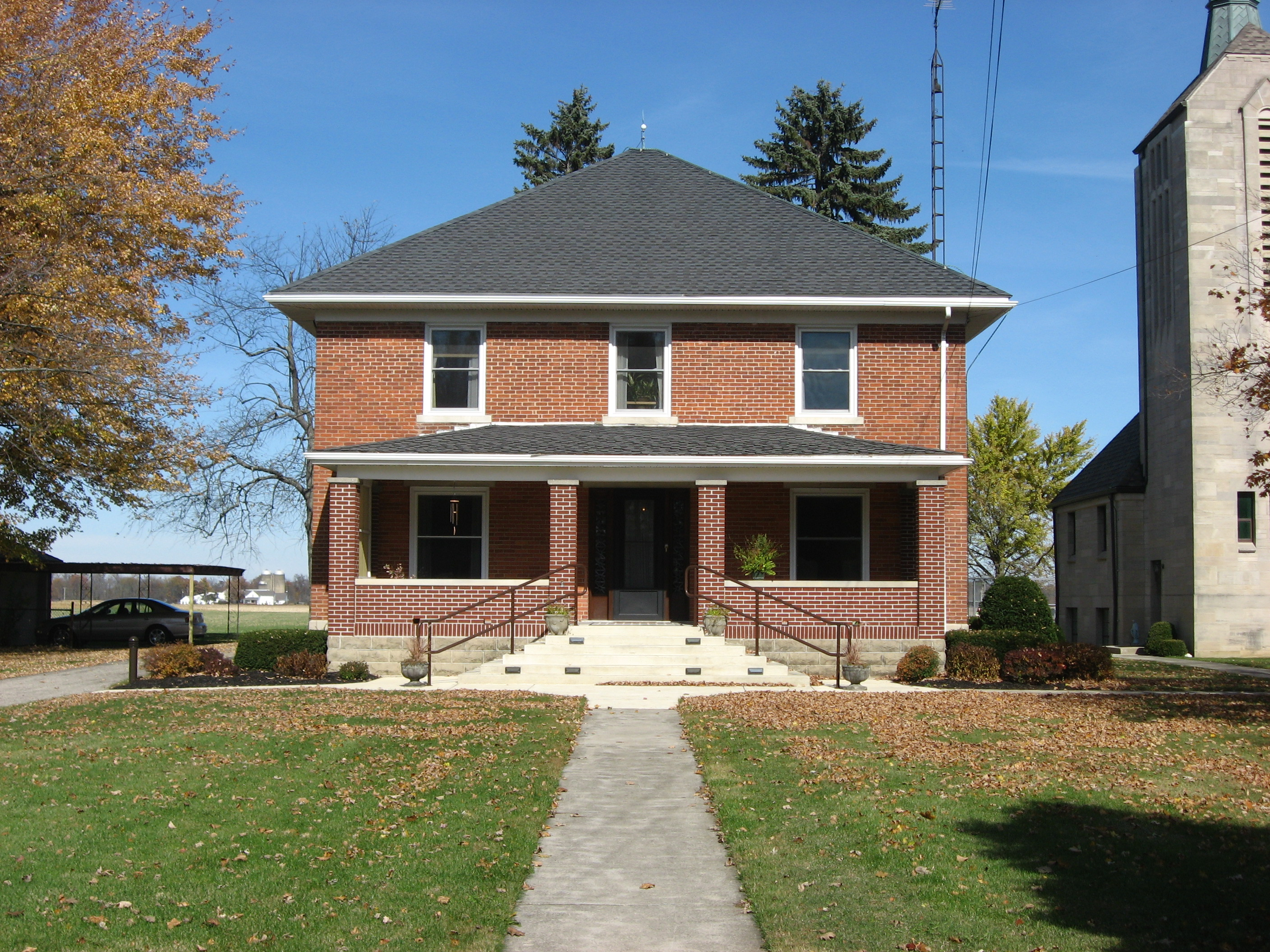
- Front of the rectory

- Location within Ohio Location within the United States
- Location: State Routes 29 and 119, McCartyville, Ohio
- Coordinates: 40°23′43″N 84°15′58″W
- Area: Less than 1 acre (0.40 ha)
- Built: 1911
- MPS: Cross-Tipped Churches of Ohio TR
- NRHP reference No.: 79002874
- Added to NRHP: July 26, 1979

Sacred Heart of Jesus Catholic Church is a parish of the Roman Catholic Church in McCartyville, Ohio, United States. Founded in the late nineteenth century, it remains an active parish to the present day. Its rectory, which was built in the early twentieth century, has been designated a historic site.

== Parish history ==
During the middle third of the nineteenth century, Ohioans began to clear the forests of the Great Black Swamp region, revealing fertile prairies. As these lands became open for farming, and as the construction of the Miami and Erie Canal created significant demand for laborers, the economy of western Ohio grew rapidly. Most settlers in the region were German farmers, while significant numbers of the canal workers were Irish. By 1850, priests of the Society of the Precious Blood had become established in the village of Minster, approximately 6 miles (9.7 km) west of McCartyville. From that place, they spread out to serve the Catholics of the surrounding region.

Located in northwestern Shelby County, approximately 3 miles (4.8 km) apart, the two heavily Catholic communities of St. Patrick and McCartyville chose to coöperate in both civil and religious matters. In order to save resources, it was decided that individuals living near St. Patrick would go to McCartyville for their post office, while McCartyville's settlers would travel to St. Patrick for worship. St. Patrick's Catholic Church was organized in 1862; it was originally served by priests from Minster, and from Fort Loramie to the southwest. This arrangement endured until 1882; in this year, the McCartyville parishioners were separated into their own parish, which was dedicated to the Sacred Heart of Jesus. Twenty families formed the charter membership of the new church, which was the last parish to be created within the original boundaries of St. Augustine parish in Minster. Precious Blood priests continued to serve the parish until 1906; since that time, the parish has been served by diocesan priests.

== Property ==
Three buildings are associated with the parish: the rectory, the church, and a former school. All three lie along the northern side of State Route 119 just east of its intersection with State Route 29. A cemetery is also associated with the church.

=== Rectory ===
From the earliest years of Catholic settlement in the Black Swamp region, parish priests typically lived at the convent closest to their churches. Early in the twentieth century, all parishes in the Archdiocese of Cincinnati were enjoined to construct rectories for their priests. Many of these houses were simple two-story rectangular brick structures with hipped roofs. The rectory at Sacred Heart church, which is similar to many other rectories in the region, lies immediately west of the church. Built in 1911, it is a square-shaped building with three bays on each side, that rests upon a foundation of cut stone with a concrete water table and a basement. Among its distinctive architectural features are a prominent cornice, large lug sills and lintels around the windows, and sidelights on both sides of the main entrance. Dominating the facade is a massive verandah-style porch with heavy brick pillars and a brick railing. The interior may be accessed through the recessed front door on the porch or through an exterior in-ground basement entrance.

=== Church ===
Located east of the rectory and west of the school, the recently constructed parish church is the largest building associated with Sacred Heart parish.

=== School ===
Many Precious Blood-served parishes in the Black Swamp region founded small parish schools for their children, because the Society and the settlers of the region placed great emphasis on Catholic education. Sacred Heart was one of these churches; its present school building was constructed in 1930. After only a few years of use, the school closed, and its building was sold to the state government for use as a public school.

== Recent history ==
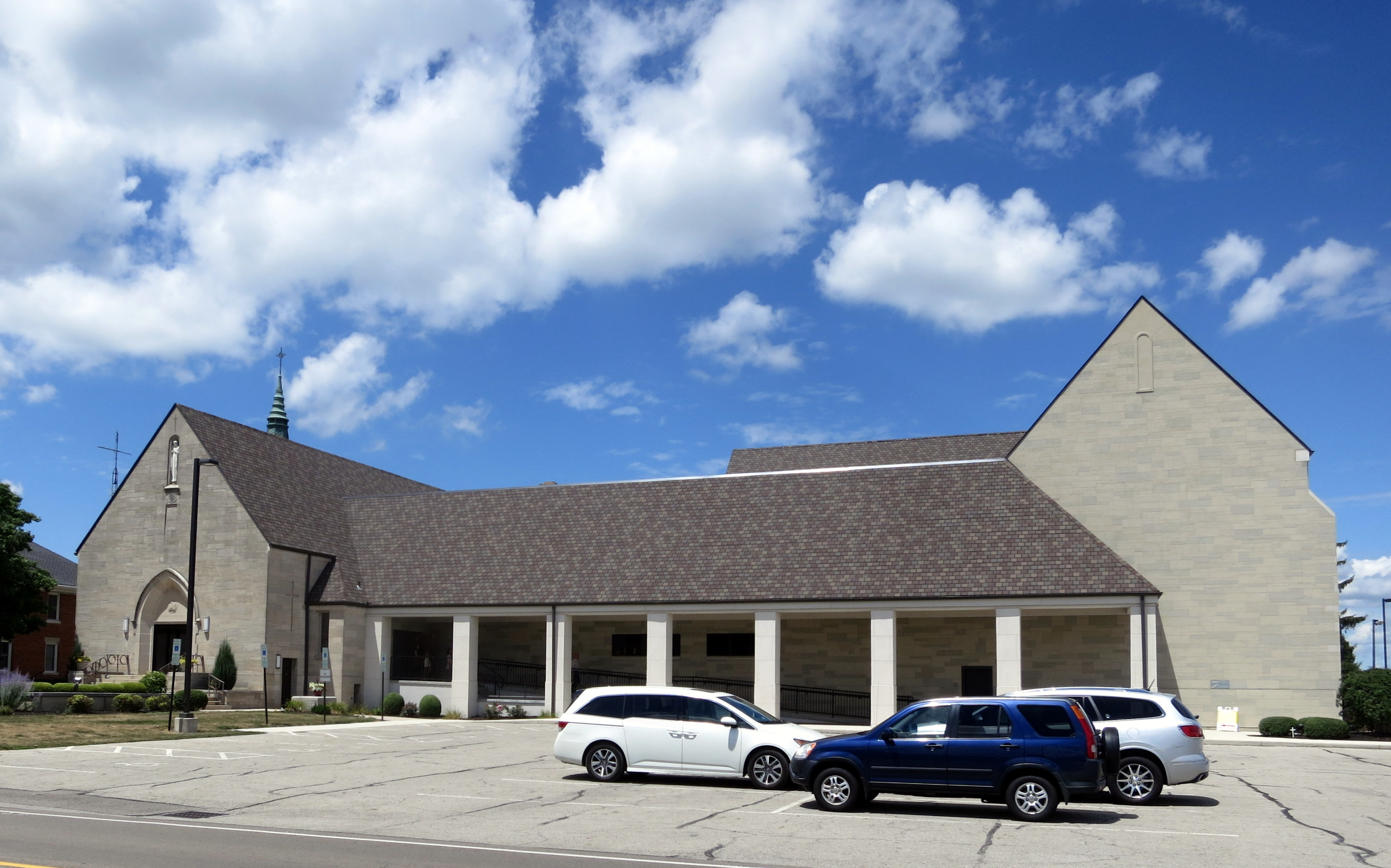
Front of Sacred Heart Church

In 1977, the Sacred Heart rectory was recorded by the "Ohio Historic Inventory," a historic preservation program of the Ohio Historical Society. The inventory found no evidence of a preservation program for the house; however, it was seen as being in good condition without any threats to its historic integrity. Although it was assessed at that time as being ineligible for inclusion on the National Register of Historic Places, it was listed on the Register two years later because of its historically significant architecture. It was one of more than thirty different Catholic churches, rectories, and other buildings to be added together to the Register; they composed a multiple property submission of buildings in western Ohio connected to the Society of the Precious Blood. Many of the churches in the region feature tall steeples that can be seen from far away; as a result, the region has become known as the "Land of the Cross-Tipped Churches."

Unlike its sister parish in St. Patrick, Sacred Heart remains an active parish in the Archdiocese of Cincinnati. It is clustered with Immaculate Conception parish in Botkins and St. Lawrence parish in Rhine; all three churches are part of the Sidney Deanery.
