= Plattsville =

Plattsville may refer to:

- Plattsville, Ontario, Canada
- Plattsville (Lubitz Flying Field) Aerodrome, an aerodrome located east of Plattsville, Ontario, Canada
- Plattsville, Connecticut, a census-designated place
- Plattsville, Ohio, an unincorporated community
