= Emanuel Lutheran Church of Montra =

Historic church in Ohio, United States

- U.S. National Register of Historic Places
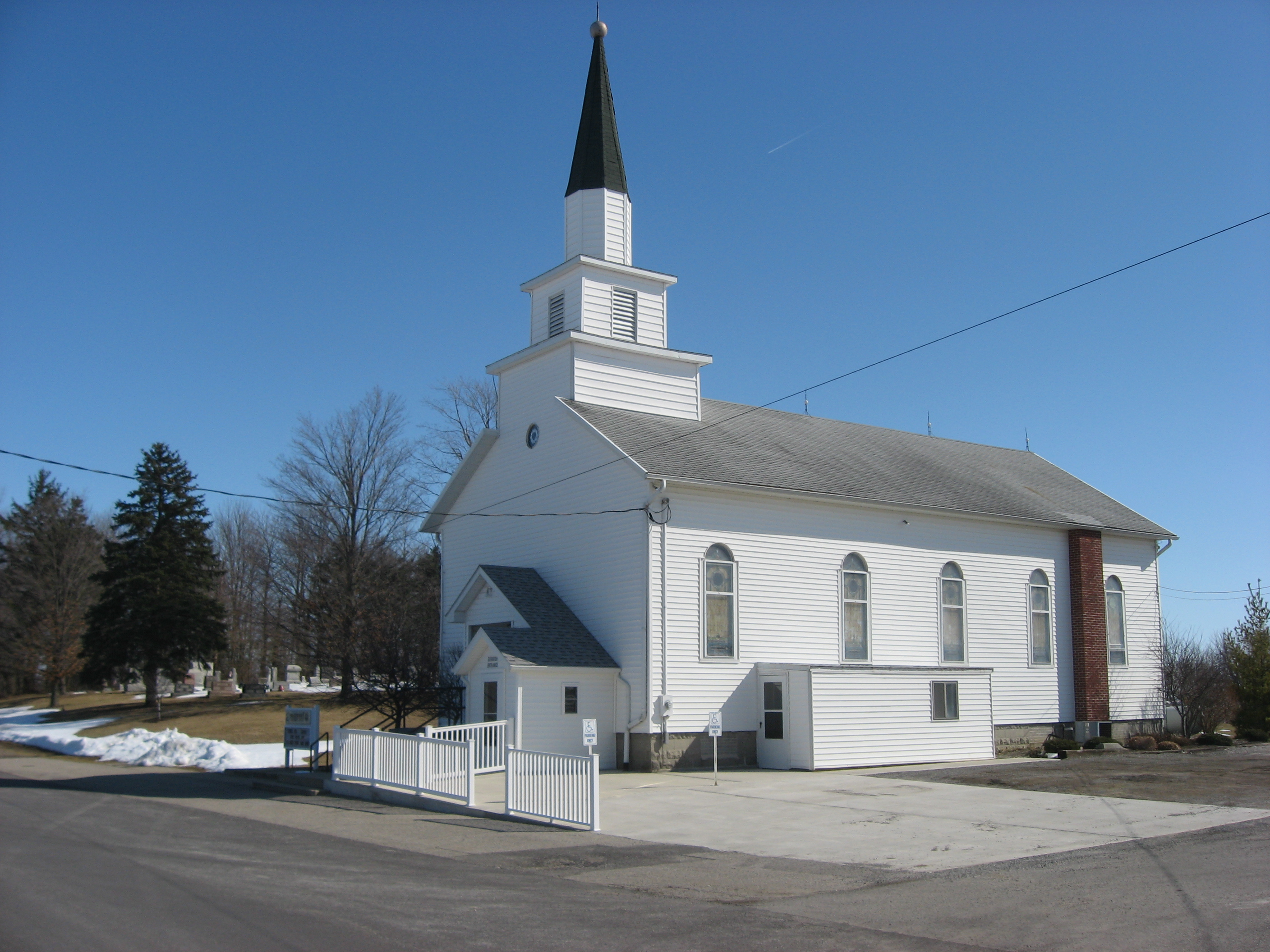
- Front and side of the church

- Location within Ohio Location within the United States
- Location: 16714 Montra Rd., Jackson Township, Shelby County, Ohio
- Nearest city: Montra
- Coordinates: 40°25′54″N 84°5′35″W
- Area: less than one acre
- Built: 1873
- NRHP reference No.: 82003640
- Added to NRHP: May 13, 1982

The Emanuel Lutheran Church of Montra is a historic church in Jackson Township, Shelby County, Ohio, United States. Located in the unincorporated community of Montra, north-northeast of the county seat of Sidney, it is the congregation's second building.

Montra was platted in 1849, but five years passed before any buildings were erected at the site. St. Emanuel's Lutheran Church was organized in a Montra storeroom in 1860 with a membership of sixteen families. The congregation worshiped in this storeroom until the completion of their first church on the eastern edge of the community in the autumn of 1862; this building measured 40 feet (12 m) by 30 feet (9.1 m) and was built at a cost of $700. Fire destroyed the building in 1874, leaving the congregation homeless for several months. A replacement church was erected on the site of the old during the summer of 1875. A frame structure like its predecessor, the new church measured 50 feet (15 m) by 40 feet (12 m) and was built at a cost of $1,800. It was officially dedicated in October 1875. Built on a stone foundation, the white wooden building is topped with a steeple and features five windows on each side.

In 1982, Emanuel Lutheran Church was listed on the National Register of Historic Places as a property that had made significant contributions to American history. Today, Emanuel is an active congregation of the Evangelical Lutheran Church in America. According to the denomination's published statistics, the congregation had 190 members and an average Sunday worship attendance of 42 as of 2019.
