= Ballou, Ohio =

Unincorporated community in Ohio, U.S.

Coordinates: 40°11′59″N 84°03′37″W

Ballou is an unincorporated community in Shelby County, in the U.S. state of Ohio.

== History ==
Ballou was one of at least three communities within Green Township. A post office called Ballou was established in 1884, and remained in operation until 1902.
