= Newbern, Ohio =

Unincorporated community in Ohio, U.S.

Coordinates: 40°15′05″N 84°14′28″W

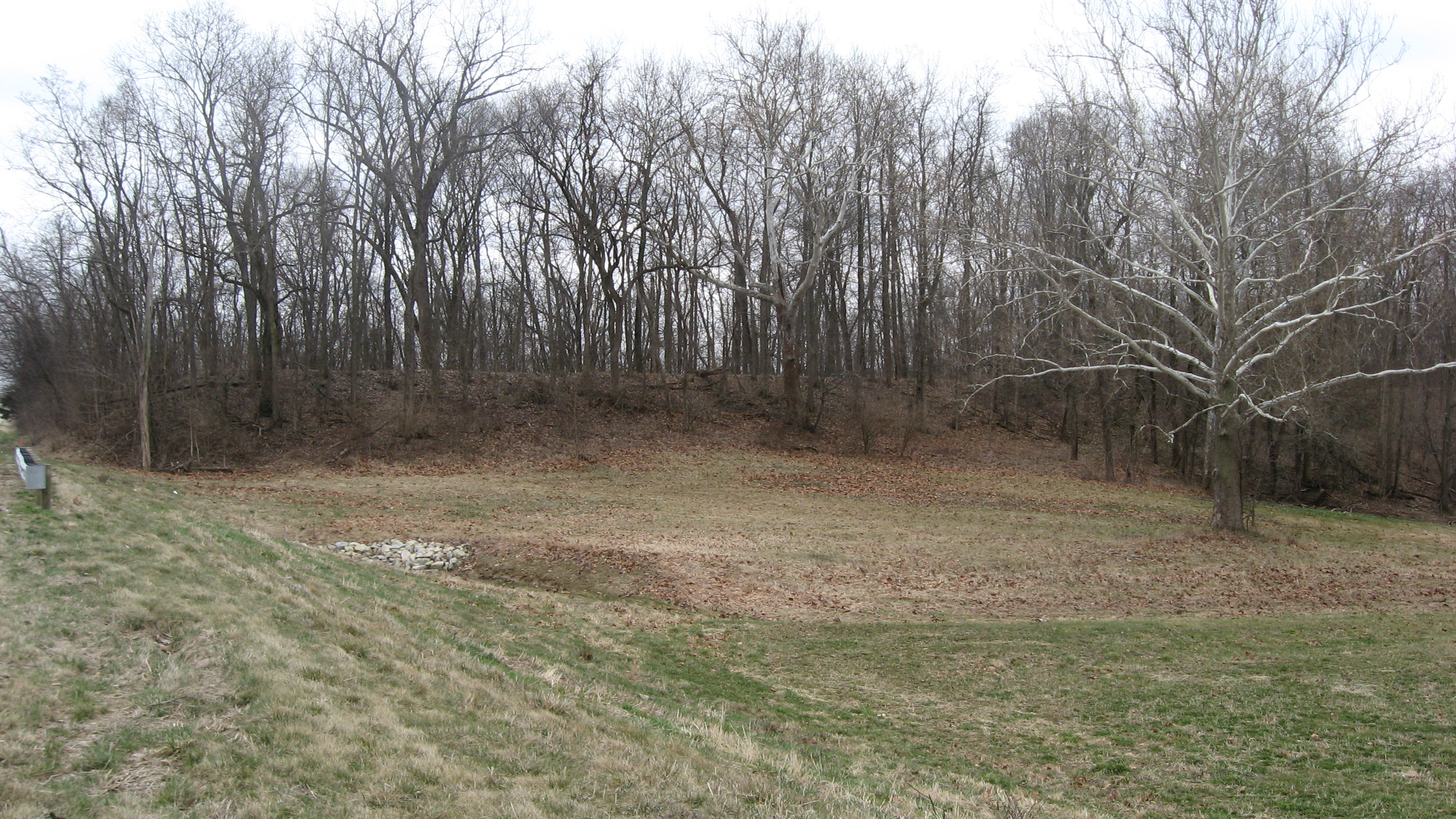
Newbern end of the Turtle Creek Culvert and Embankment, which carried the canal over Turtle Creek

Newbern is an unincorporated community in Shelby County, in the U.S. state of Ohio.

== History ==
Newbern was located on the Miami and Erie Canal.
