= Oran, Ohio =

Unincorporated community in Ohio, U.S.

Coordinates: 40°17′28″N 84°19′18″W

Oran is an unincorporated community in Shelby County, in the U.S. state of Ohio.

== History ==
A post office called Oran was established in 1873, and remained in operation until 1904. In 1913, Oran had around 38 inhabitants.
