= Depew, Ohio =

- Unincorporated community
- Location within Ohio Location within the United States
- Coordinates: 40°13′58″N 84°06′55″W
- Country: United States
- State: Ohio
- County: Shelby
- Elevation: 1,070 ft (330 m)
- Time zone: UTC-5 (Eastern (EST))
  - Summer (DST): UTC-4 (EDT)
- Area codes: 937, 326
- GNIS feature ID: 1064532

Depew (also De Pew, Heckleburney) is an unincorporated community in Shelby County, Ohio, United States.
