= Port Jefferson School =

- U.S. National Register of Historic Places
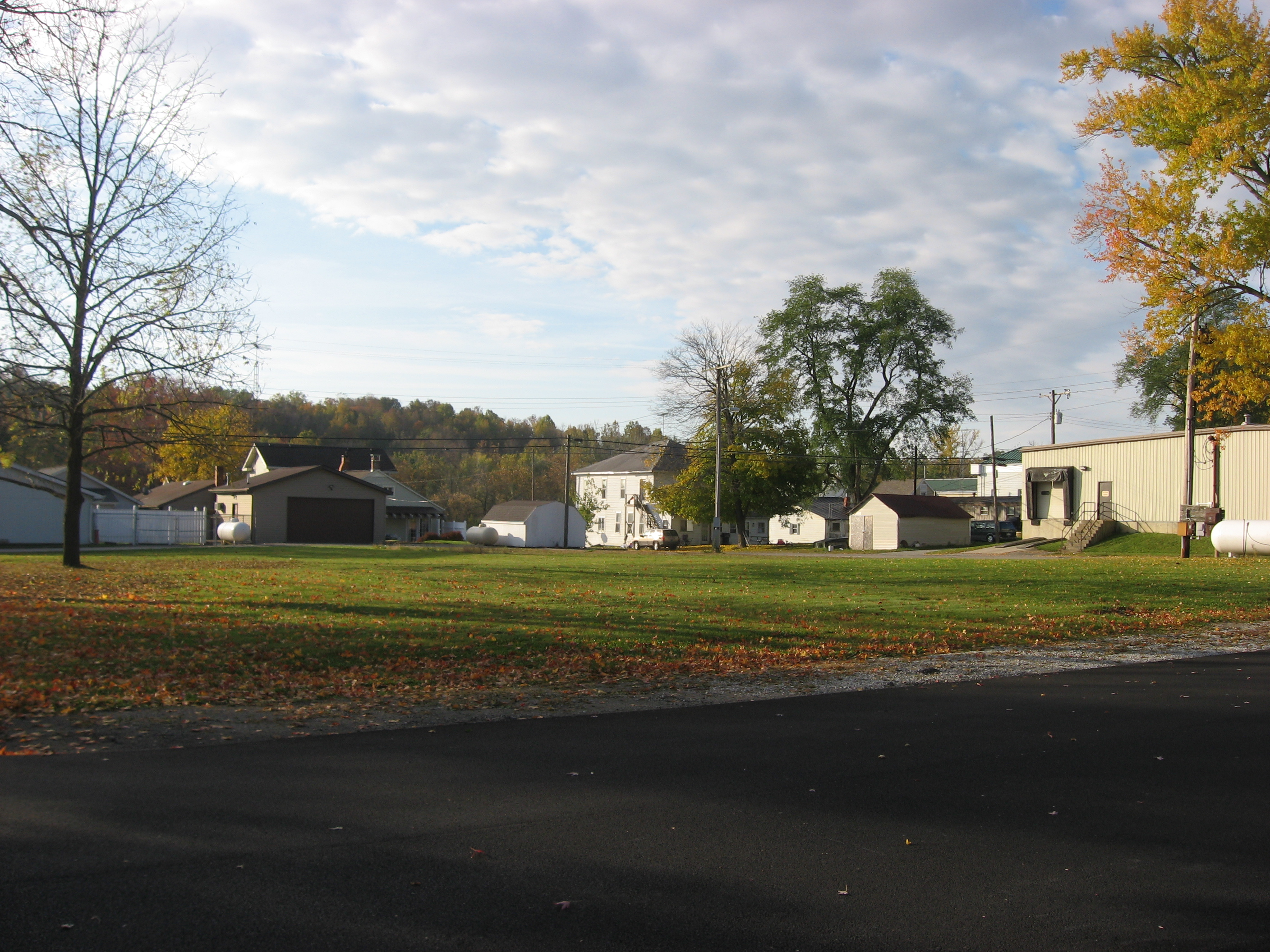
- Site of the school

- Location within Ohio Location within the United States
- Location: Wall and Spring Sts., Port Jefferson, Ohio
- Coordinates: 40°19′47″N 84°5′36″W
- Area: Less than 1 acre (0.40 ha)
- Built: 1877
- Architectural style: Gothic Revival
- NRHP reference No.: 82003641
- Added to NRHP: June 2, 1982

The Port Jefferson School was a historic school in the village of Port Jefferson, Ohio, United States. Built in 1877, this two-story structure was once the most distinctive Gothic Revival school in rural western Ohio. At the time of construction, it was used as the community high school, but in its last years it was converted into an elementary school. After its closure in 1981, it became the village hall for a time.

Exterior of the former school; note the entrance in the middle of the front

Three bays wide on the front, the school was a brick structure supported by a stone foundation. Among its leading architectural features were the three lancet windows above the grand entrance, which was trimmed with stone and ornamented with multiple keystones.

In 1982, the Port Jefferson School was listed on the National Register of Historic Places because of its place in local history. Since that time, the school has been destroyed, but the lot at the corner of Wall and Spring Streets remains listed on the Register.
