= Van Buren Township, Shelby County, Ohio =

Township in Ohio, US

- Township
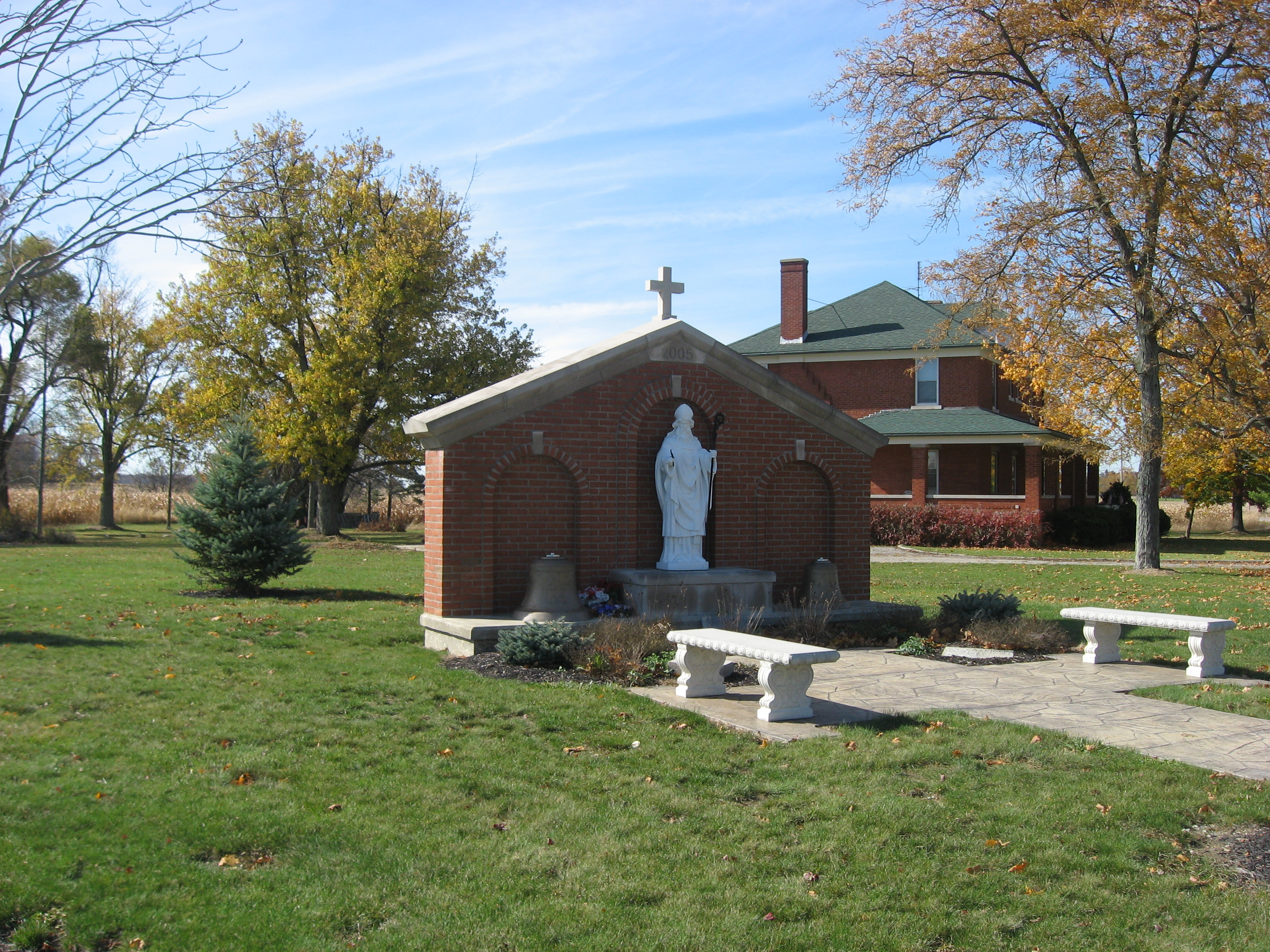
- Former site of St. Patrick's Catholic Church in St. Patrick

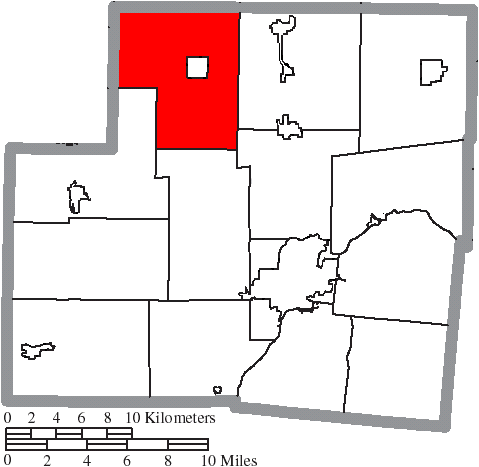
- Location of Van Buren Township in Shelby County
- Coordinates: 40°26′46″N 84°16′19″W
- Country: United States
- State: Ohio
- County: Shelby

Area
  - Total: 37.1 sq mi (96.0 km^{2})
  - Land: 37.0 sq mi (95.8 km^{2})
  - Water: 0.077 sq mi (0.2 km^{2})
- Elevation: 978 ft (298 m)

Population (2020)
  - Total: 2,083
  - Density: 56/sq mi (21.7/km^{2})
- Time zone: UTC-5 (Eastern (EST))
  - Summer (DST): UTC-4 (EDT)
- FIPS code: 39-79464
- GNIS feature ID: 1086970

Van Buren Township is one of the fourteen townships of Shelby County, Ohio, United States. The 2020 census found 2,083 people in the township.

== Geography ==
Located in the northwestern corner of the county, it borders the following townships:

- Washington Township, Auglaize County - north
- Pusheta Township, Auglaize County - northeast corner
- Dinsmore Township - east
- Franklin Township - southeast
- Turtle Creek Township - south
- McLean Township - southwest, east of Jackson Township
- Jackson Township, Auglaize County - southwest corner, west of McLean Township
- German Township, Auglaize County - west
- Saint Marys Township, Auglaize County - northwest

The village of Kettlersville lies in central Van Buren Township and the unincorporated community of McCartyville is located in the township's south.

== Name and history ==
Statewide, other Van Buren Townships are located in Darke, Hancock, Putnam counties.

Van Buren township was organized on December 1, 1834.

== Government ==
The township is governed by a three-member board of trustees, who are elected in November of odd-numbered years to a four-year term beginning on the following January 1. Two are elected in the year after the presidential election and one is elected in the year before it. There is also an elected township fiscal officer, who serves a four-year term beginning on April 1 of the year after the election, which is held in November of the year before the presidential election. Vacancies in the fiscal officership or on the board of trustees are filled by the remaining trustees.
