= Sidney Walnut Avenue Historic District =

Historic district in Ohio, United States

- U.S. National Register of Historic Places
- U.S. Historic district
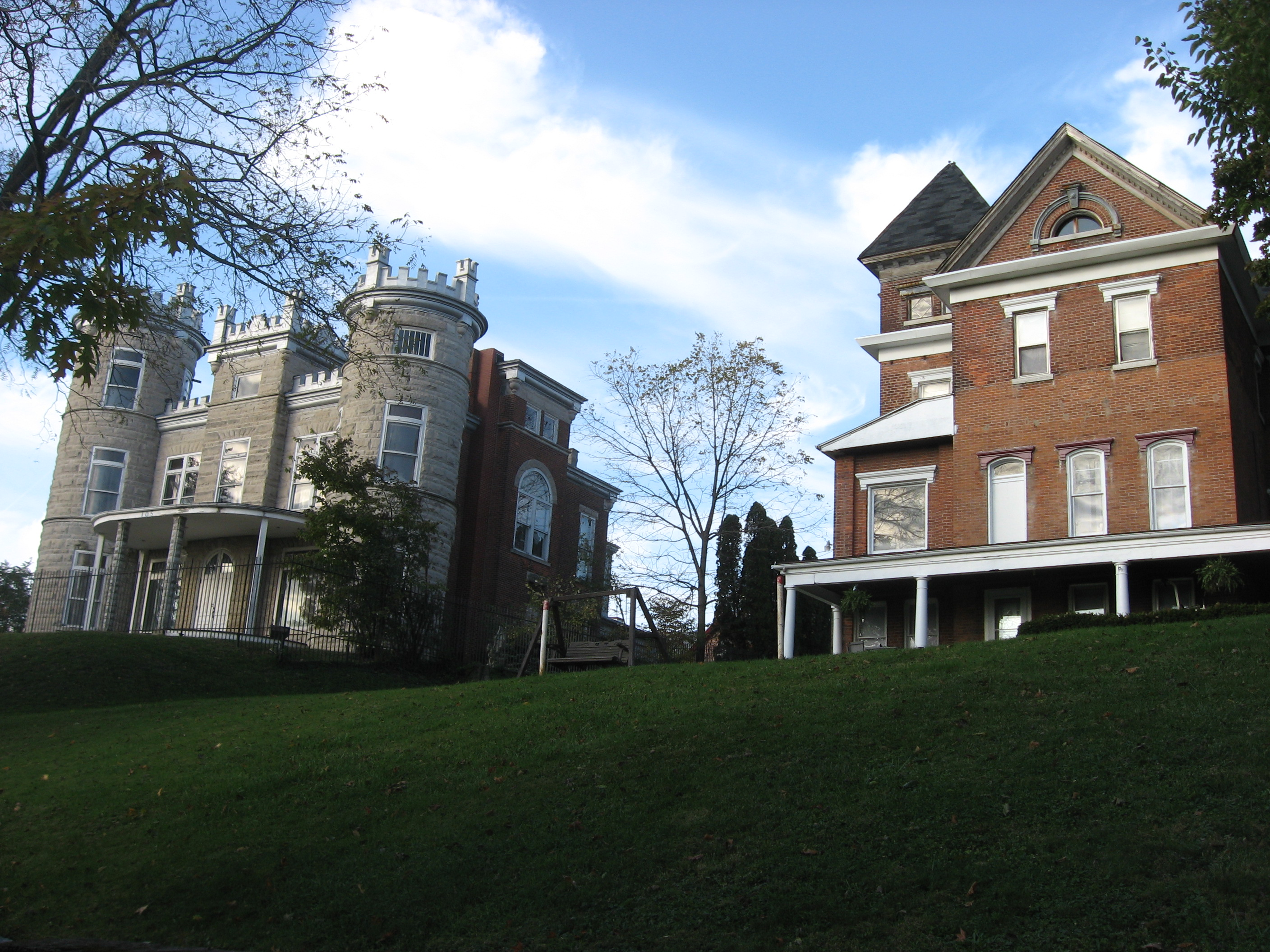
- Houses in the district

- Location within Ohio Location within the United States
- Location: Walnut Ave. from Poplar to Michigan Sts., and 228, 228½, and 238 W. North St.
- Nearest city: Sidney, Ohio
- Coordinates: 40°17′12″N 84°9′37″W
- Area: 8.6 acres (3.5 ha)
- Built: 1847
- Architect: Multiple
- Architectural style: Greek Revival, Italianate, Queen Anne
- NRHP reference No.: 83004338
- Added to NRHP: December 29, 1983

The Sidney Walnut Avenue Historic District is a neighborhood and historic district on the western side of the city of Sidney, Ohio, United States. Located a short distance northwest of the city's downtown, the Walnut Avenue District has been Sidney's premier residential neighborhood since its creation in the late nineteenth century.

Fifteen houses compose the district, which is located on the sides and top of a small hill. Twelve of the fifteen are located along Walnut Avenue, and the other three line North Street; they were built in such styles as Queen Anne, Greek Revival, and Italianate. Common construction materials include stone foundations, brick walls, and slate roofs. Although the oldest property in the district dates back to 1847, and the newest to 1913, the majority of the district's houses were built in the last years of the nineteenth century, and most houses in the neighborhood that are significantly older were extensively modified at that time. During the late nineteenth century, Sidney was passing through a period of transformation: since its establishment in 1820, its identity was that of a small county seat in an agricultural region, but by the end of the century, institutions such as the People's Federal Savings and Loan Association were causing it to gain prominence in commerce, industry, and banking. Leading members of the city's society, such as factory owners, bankers, and businessmen built large homes on the hillside along Walnut Avenue, and it became known as the city's élite residential neighborhood. Among its most important residents were jeweller Edward Kah, merchant Elias Griffis, garden company owner Bernard Wagner, and educator Herbert McVay.

At the end of 1983, the Sidney Walnut Avenue Historic District was listed on the National Register of Historic Places. The district qualified for inclusion under two separate criteria: it was eligible because of its place in local history, and it was similarly eligible because of the distinctive historic architecture of the buildings within its boundaries. It was the last of Shelby County's three historic districts to be added to the Register, following the Lockington Locks by fourteen years and the Sidney Courthouse Square by three years.
