= St. Patrick's Catholic Church (St. Patrick, Ohio) =

Catholic church in Ohio, US

- St. Patrick Catholic Church and Rectory
- U.S. National Register of Historic Places
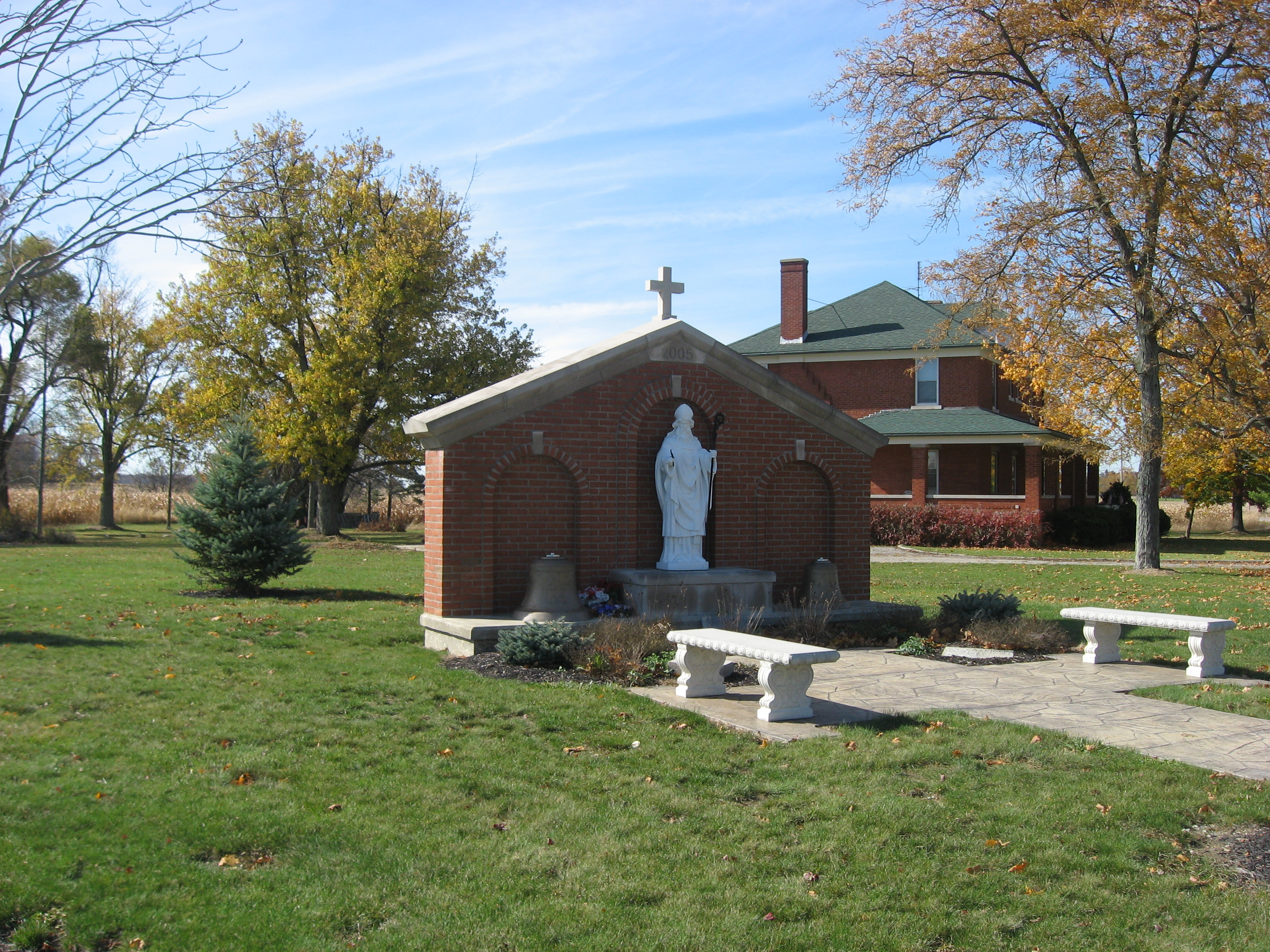
- Memorial on the site of St. Patrick's Church

- Location within Ohio Location within the United States
- Location: Hoying and Wright-Puthoff Rds., St. Patrick, Ohio
- Coordinates: 40°22′13″N 84°17′19″W
- Area: Less than 1 acre (0.40 ha)
- Built: 1915
- Architect: Louis Ley
- Architectural style: Italianate
- MPS: Cross-Tipped Churches of Ohio TR
- NRHP reference No.: 79002836
- Added to NRHP: July 26, 1979

St. Patrick's Catholic Church was a Catholic church in northwestern Shelby County, Ohio, United States. Located in the southwestern corner of Van Buren Township, the church sat at the intersection of Hoying and Wright-Puthoff Roads in the unincorporated community of St. Patrick.

== Parish history ==
St. Patrick parish was organized in 1862 among a primarily Irish population. Although the region was settled primarily by German farmers, the members at St. Patrick were generally laborers who had been recruited to participate in the construction of the Miami and Erie Canal through western Shelby County. Starting one year later, the parish was served by priests from the Missionaries of the Precious Blood; these priests were based in Minster, nearly five miles to the northwest. The parish built a log church in 1863; it was replaced by a frame church in 1871. Members in the vicinity of McCartyville to the northeast were created a separate parish in 1882, weakening the original parish.

== Architecture ==
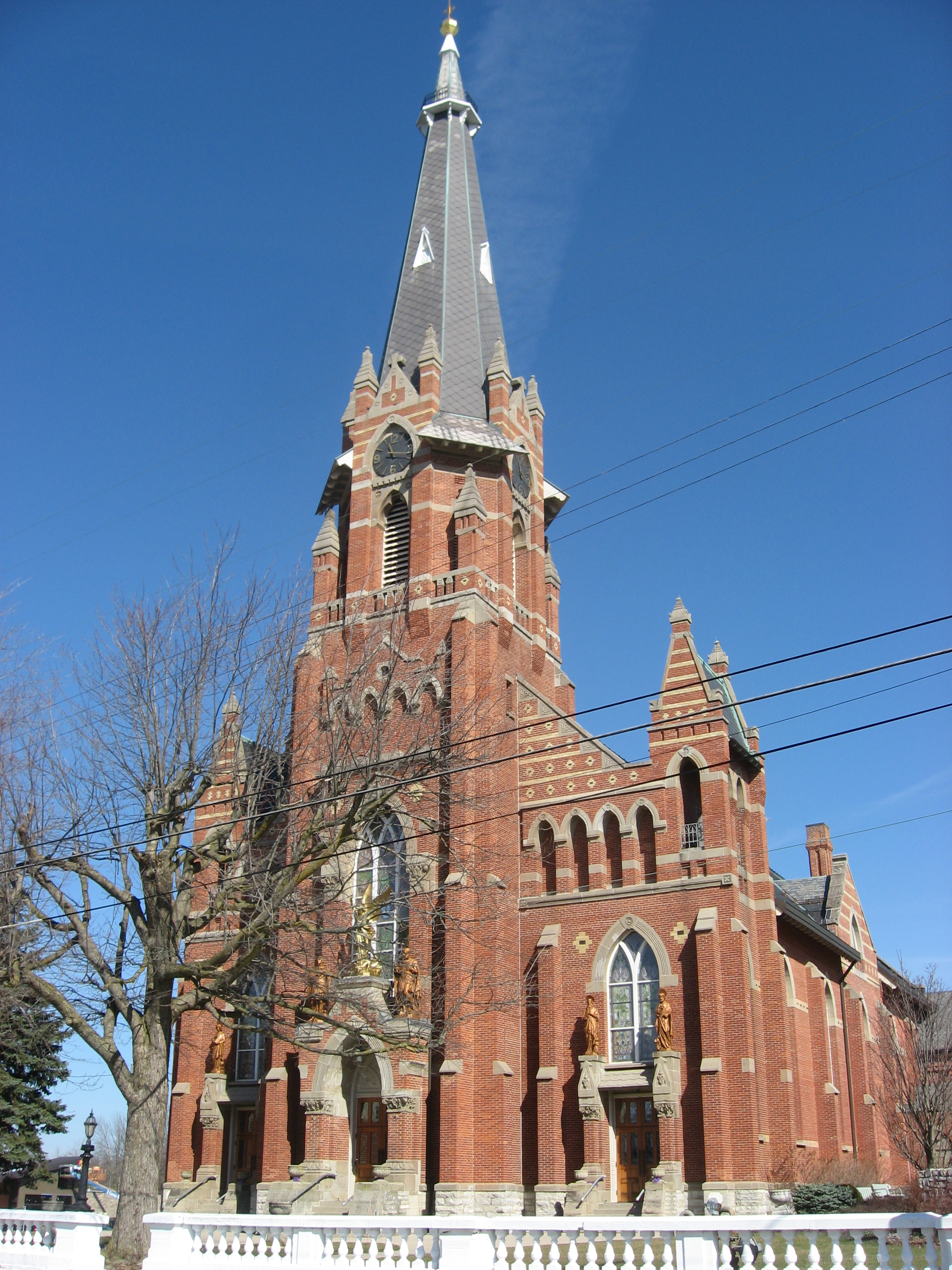
St. Patrick's was significantly different from typical churches in
the region, such as St. Michael's Church in Fort Loramie.

By the 1910s, the old frame building had proved insufficient for the church's needs. Consequently, the parish arranged for the erection of its third and final church, a Flemish bond brick structure constructed in a transitional Italianate style of architecture. This building was based on a foundation of concrete and a gabled tile roof; the rectangular church featured a square bell tower on its southwestern corner. The interior featured frescoes and a prominent statue of Saint Patrick (the patron saint of Ireland); it was lit by multiple windows of stained glass. As a large church in a rural setting served by priests of the Society of the Precious Blood, St. Patrick's was closely connected to many other churches in western Ohio: wide areas of western Ohio that were primarily settled by Catholics feature large churches at sparsely populated crossroads. While most of these churches are constructed in the Gothic Revival style of architecture, some of the newer churches of the region — including St. Patrick's — appear in a variety of styles; St. Patrick's was one of the few that lacked the high steeples of the Gothic Revival structures. The leading role of these churches in western Shelby County and the lands somewhat farther west has caused the region to be nicknamed the "Land of the Cross-Tipped Churches."

== Other buildings ==
St. Patrick's Church was one of four properties owned by the parish in the community of St. Patrick. Located to the east of the church was the parish cemetery; across Hoying Road to the north was the former parish school, built in 1906; and to the east is the brick rectory. A square two-story structure, the rectory features a hip roof and a stone foundation. The parish built the rectory in 1919 to house its pastor; before its construction, St. Patrick's was served by priests from St. Michael's Church in Fort Loramie to the southwest.

== Recent history ==
In 1977, the church and rectory were recorded by the Ohio Historic Inventory for the purpose of historic preservation; both buildings were ranked in good condition without any significant risks. Two years later, they were listed together on the National Register of Historic Places, along with over thirty other buildings in the Land of the Cross-Tipped Churches. When these churches were listed, it was feared that some rural churches were ultimately endangered by changing demographics; while all of the other churches remain active parishes, St. Patrick's has closed. While the parish was listed as being in operation in 1996, it no longer appears on the website of the Archdiocese of Cincinnati, and the church has been destroyed. A small memorial occupies the site of the church, while the rectory remains in its place.
