= Dawson, Ohio =

Unincorporated community in Ohio, U.S.

Coordinates: 40°15′38″N 84°19′11″W

Dawson is an unincorporated community in Shelby County, in the U.S. state of Ohio.

== History ==
A post office was established at Dawson in 1883, and remained in operation until it was discontinued in 1928. A station on the New York Central Railroad, a variant name was Patrick Station.
