= Tawawa, Ohio =

Unincorporated community in Ohio, U.S.

Coordinates: 40°20′44″N 83°55′50″W

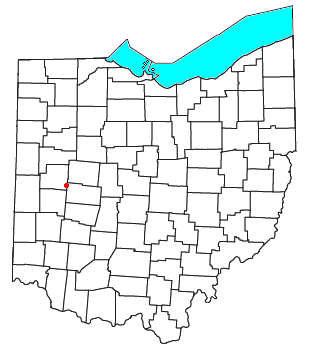
Location of Tawawa, Ohio

Tawawa is an unincorporated community in northeastern Green Township, Shelby County, Ohio, United States. It lies along State Route 29 less than one mile (about 1½ km) away from the Champaign County border. Mosquito Creek, a tributary of the Great Miami River, flows northwestward along the southern edge of Tawawa. The community lies 8 miles (12¾ km) southeast of the city of Sidney, the county seat of Shelby County.

== History ==
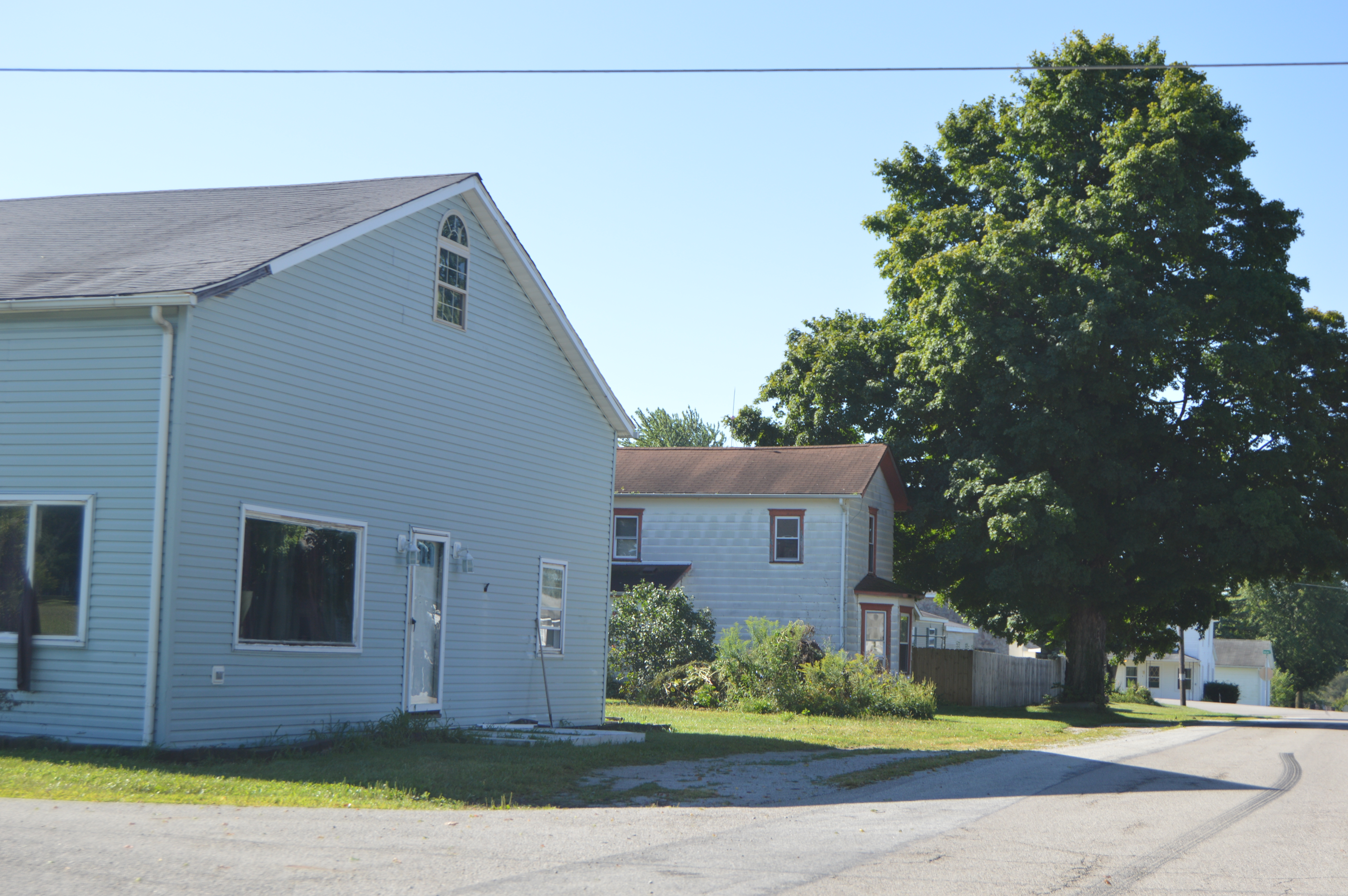
Houses on Tawawa-Maplewood Road

Tawawa was originally called New Palestine, and under the latter name was laid out in 1832. A post office called Tawawa was established in 1848, and remained in operation until 1905. The name Tawawa was the Native American name for Mosquito Creek.
