= Green Township, Shelby County, Ohio =

Township in Ohio, US

- Township
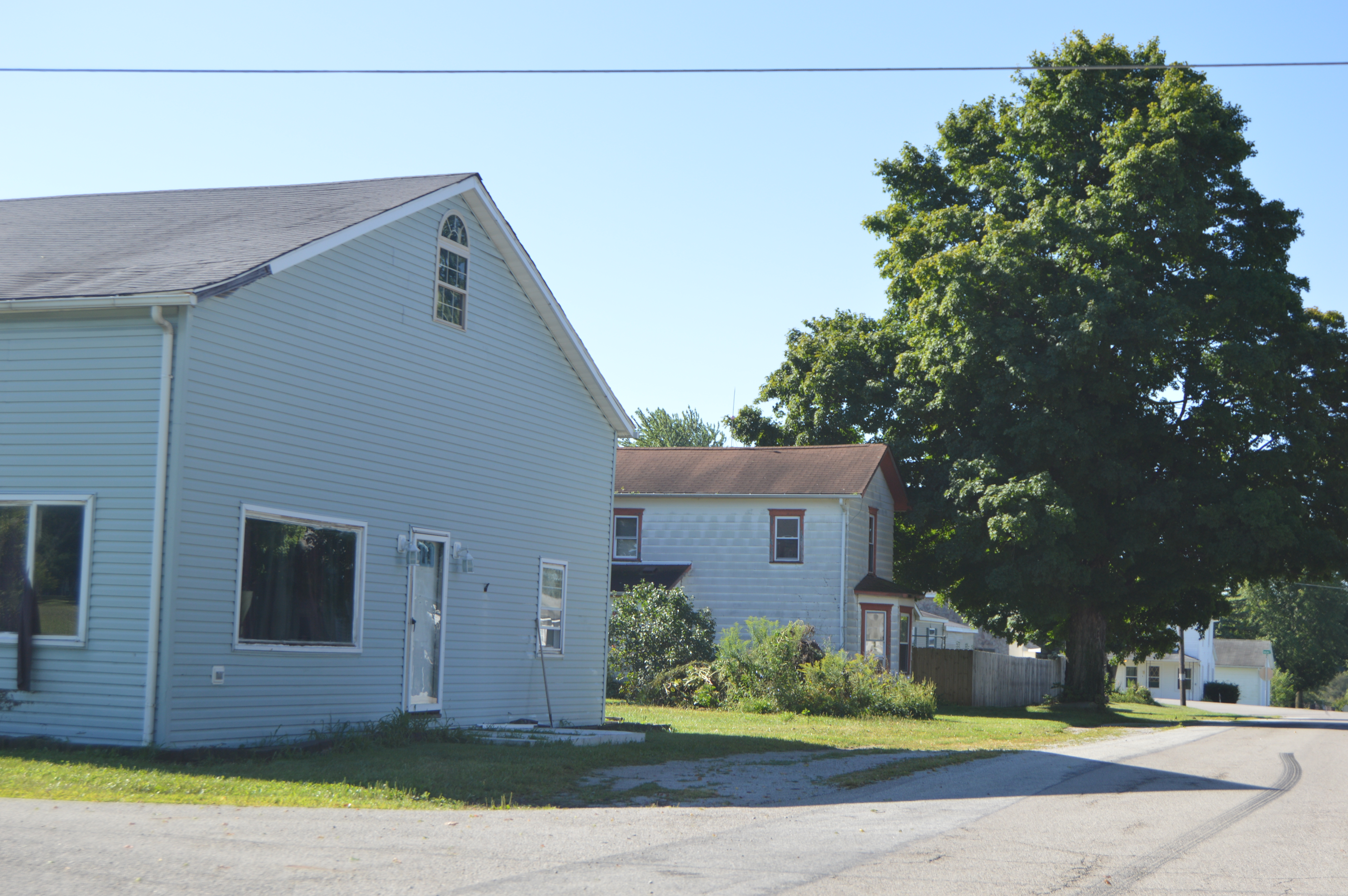
- Houses in Tawawa

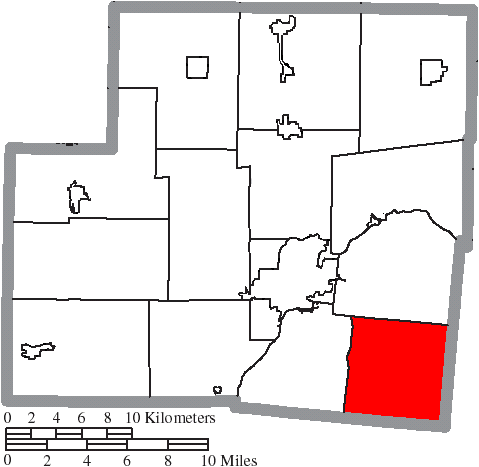
- Location of Green Township in Shelby County
- Coordinates: 40°13′45″N 84°3′57″W
- Country: United States
- State: Ohio
- County: Shelby

Area
  - Total: 25.2 sq mi (65.3 km^{2})
  - Land: 25.2 sq mi (65.3 km^{2})
  - Water: 0 sq mi (0.0 km^{2})
- Elevation: 1,080 ft (330 m)

Population (2020)
  - Total: 903
  - Density: 35.8/sq mi (13.8/km^{2})
- Time zone: UTC-5 (Eastern (EST))
  - Summer (DST): UTC-4 (EDT)
- FIPS code: 39-31850
- GNIS feature ID: 1086962

Green Township is one of the fourteen townships of Shelby County, Ohio, United States. The 2020 census found 903 people in the township.

== Geography ==
Located in the southeastern corner of the county, it borders the following townships:

- Perry Township – north
- Adams Township, Champaign County – northeast
- Johnson Township, Champaign County – southeast
- Brown Township, Miami County – south
- Orange Township – west

No municipalities are located in Green Township, although the unincorporated community of Tawawa lies in the township's northeast.

== Name and history ==
It is one of sixteen Green Townships statewide.

== Government ==
The township is governed by a three-member board of trustees, who are elected in November of odd-numbered years to a four-year term beginning on the following January 1. Two are elected in the year after the presidential election and one is elected in the year before it. There is also an elected township fiscal officer, who serves a four-year term beginning on April 1 of the year after the election, which is held in November of the year before the presidential election. Vacancies in the fiscal officership or on the board of trustees are filled by the remaining trustees.
