= Whitby Mansion =

Historic house in Ohio, United States

- U.S. National Register of Historic Places
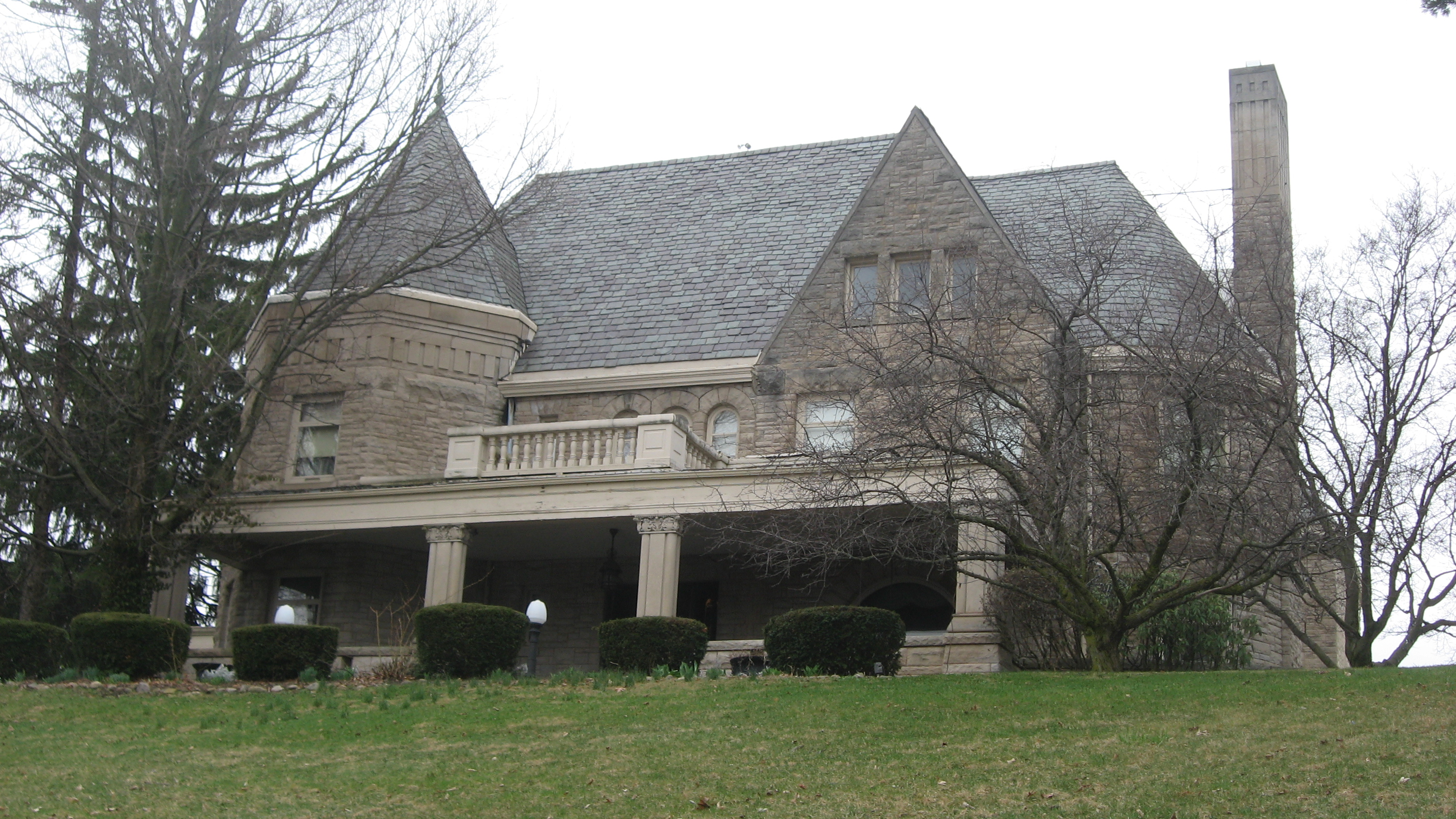
- Streetside view of the mansion

- Location within Ohio Location within the United States
- Location: 429 N. Ohio Ave., Sidney, Ohio
- Coordinates: 40°17′26″N 84°9′26″W
- Area: less than one acre
- Built: 1890
- Architectural style: Tudor Revival, Jacobethan; Châteauesque
- NRHP reference No.: 76001526
- Added to NRHP: December 12, 1976

The Whitby Mansion is a historic mansion in Sidney, Ohio, United States. Built in 1890, it was originally the home of W.H.C. Goode, a Sidney industrialist. Descended from one of the First Families of Virginia, Goode first purchased property in the vicinity of Sidney in 1849. Having gained complete ownership of the leading steel scraper manufacturing company in the United States in 1877, Goode began to build his mansion on Sidney's northern side in the late 1880s. The resulting mansion, designed by an unknown architect, features massive stone walls that are topped with a slate roof. Elements of the Jacobethan and Châteauesque styles are combined with the Tudor Revival style of architecture. By the mid-1970s, the mansion had ceased to be a house; it had been purchased by The Way International and converted into a historic archive and art museum. Today, the property is owned by GreatStone Castle Resorts, which operates it as a bed and breakfast.

In 1976, the Whitby Mansion was listed on the National Register of Historic Places because of its historically significant architecture. It was seen as historically significant primarily as a leading example of the architecture of the rich in late nineteenth-century America.
