= Plattsville, Ohio =

Unincorporated community in Ohio, U.S.

Coordinates: 40°13′56″N 84°04′39″W

Plattsville is an unincorporated community in Shelby County, in the U.S. state of Ohio.

== History ==
Plattsville was platted in 1844. The community derives its name from John Platt, a local resident. A post office called Plattsville was established in 1854, and remained in operation until 1901.
