= Anna Town Hall =

- U.S. National Register of Historic Places
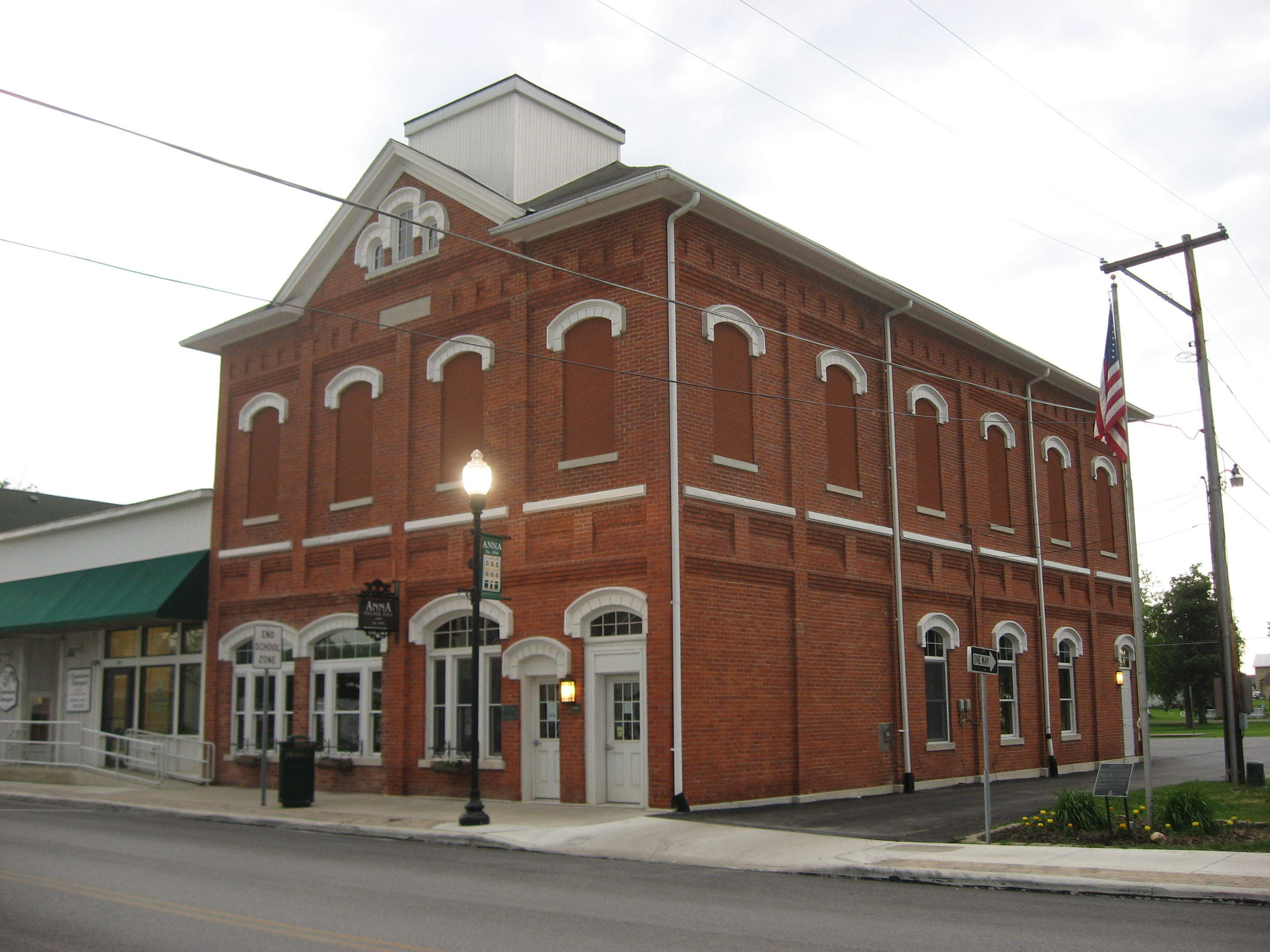
- Front and side of the town hall

- Location within Ohio Location within the United States
- Location: 209 W. Main St., Anna, Ohio
- Coordinates: 40°23′41″N 84°10′33″W
- Area: less than one acre
- Built: 1880
- Architect: John W. Carey
- NRHP reference No.: 78002187
- Added to NRHP: September 20, 1978

The Anna Town Hall is a historic brick town hall in Anna, Ohio, United States. Built in 1880, it originally included space for the village offices, a jail, a fire station, and a community theater. The building's brick architecture presents a stark contrast to the majority of buildings in the village, which includes primarily frame structures.

Although the first settlers in the vicinity of modern Anna arrived in 1833, the village was started a quarter century later; it was platted in 1858 by landowner John W. Carey and named for his daughter, Anna Carey. Shortly after the village incorporated in 1877, the need for a community government building became apparent, and the present structure was erected on the main road from the canal town of Minster to a rail line operated by a predecessor of the Baltimore and Ohio Railroad. In recognition of its place in local history and of its well-preserved historic architecture, the Anna Town Hall was listed on the National Register of Historic Places in 1978.
