= Port Jefferson, Ohio =

- Village
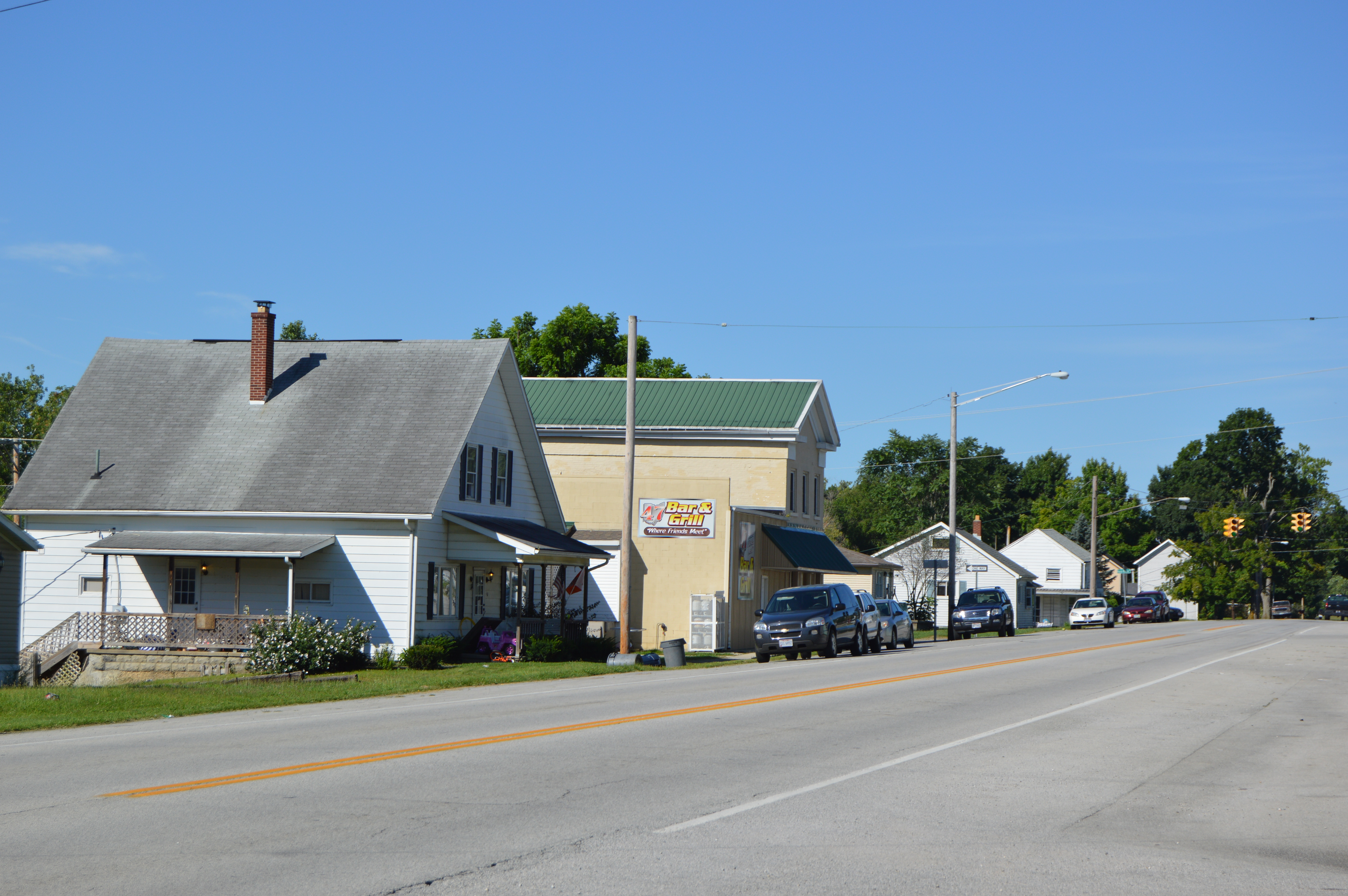
- Main Street downtown

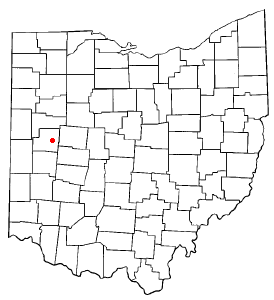
- Location of Port Jefferson, Ohio

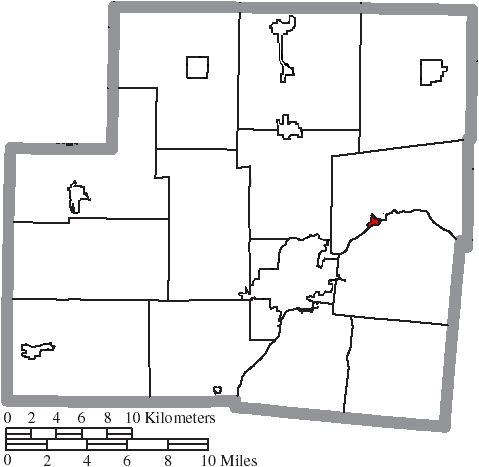
- Location of Port Jefferson in Shelby County
- Coordinates: 40°19′49″N 84°05′33″W
- Country: United States
- State: Ohio
- County: Shelby

Area
  - Total: 0.15 sq mi (0.40 km^{2})
  - Land: 0.15 sq mi (0.39 km^{2})
  - Water: 0 sq mi (0.00 km^{2})
- Elevation: 971 ft (296 m)

Population (2020)
  - Total: 308
  - Density: 2,000/sq mi (780/km^{2})
- Time zone: UTC-5 (Eastern (EST))
  - Summer (DST): UTC-4 (EDT)
- ZIP code: 45360
- Area codes: 937, 326
- FIPS code: 39-64262
- GNIS feature ID: 2399004

Port Jefferson is a village in Salem Township, Shelby County, Ohio, United States. The population was 308 at the 2020 census.

== History ==
Port Jefferson had its start around the time the Miami and Erie Canal was extended to that point. The town site was platted in 1836. The village was incorporated in 1842.

== Geography ==
According to the United States Census Bureau, the village has a total area of 0.19 square miles (0.49 km^{2}), of which 0.17 square miles (0.44 km^{2}) is land and 0.02 square miles (0.05 km^{2}) is water.

== Demographics ==
Historical population
Census	Pop.	Note	%±
1850	286		—
1870	410		—
1880	421		2.7%
1890	397		−5.7%
1900	355		−10.6%
1910	233		−34.4%
1920	237		1.7%
1930	270		13.9%
1940	360		33.3%
1950	409		13.6%
1960	438		7.1%
1970	416		−5.0%
1980	482		15.9%
1990	381		−21.0%
2000	321		−15.7%
2010	371		15.6%
2020	308		−17.0%
U.S. Decennial Census

=== 2010 census ===
As of the census of 2010, there were 371 people, 142 households, and 97 families living in the village. The population density was 2,182.4 inhabitants per square mile (842.6/km^{2}). There were 158 housing units at an average density of 929.4 per square mile (358.8/km^{2}). The racial makeup of the village was 100.0% White.

There were 142 households, of which 31.7% had children under the age of 18 living with them, 53.5% were married couples living together, 12.7% had a female householder with no husband present, 2.1% had a male householder with no wife present, and 31.7% were non-families. 23.9% of all households were made up of individuals, and 7% had someone living alone who was 65 years of age or older. The average household size was 2.61 and the average family size was 3.07.

The median age in the village was 36.6 years. 25.3% of residents were under the age of 18; 9.7% were between the ages of 18 and 24; 28.1% were from 25 to 44; 26.4% were from 45 to 64; and 10.5% were 65 years of age or older. The gender makeup of the village was 51.2% male and 48.8% female.

=== 2000 census ===
As of the census of 2000, there were 321 people, 122 households, and 90 families living in the village. The population density was 2,084.8 inhabitants per square mile (804.9/km^{2}). There were 128 housing units at an average density of 831.3 per square mile (321.0/km^{2}). The racial makeup of the village was 99.69% White and 0.31% Asian.

There were 122 households, out of which 29.5% had children under the age of 18 living with them, 58.2% were married couples living together, 9.8% had a female householder with no husband present, and 26.2% were non-families. 22.1% of all households were made up of individuals, and 6.6% had someone living alone who was 65 years of age or older. The average household size was 2.63 and the average family size was 2.97.

In the village, the population was spread out, with 22.7% under the age of 18, 9.0% from 18 to 24, 34.6% from 25 to 44, 19.0% from 45 to 64, and 14.6% who were 65 years of age or older. The median age was 36 years. For every 100 females there were 103.2 males. For every 100 females age 18 and over, there were 108.4 males.

The median income for a household in the village was $34,306, and the median income for a family was $47,000. Males had a median income of $31,063 versus $21,154 for females. The per capita income for the village was $16,897. About 5.0% of families and 8.3% of the population were below the poverty line, including none of those under age 18 and 18.4% of those age 65 or over.
