= St. Patrick, Ohio =

Unincorporated community in Ohio, United States

St. Patrick, Michigan
- Unincorporated community
- Location within Ohio Location within the United States
- Coordinates: 40°22′15″N 84°17′15″W
- Country: United States
- State: Ohio
- County: Shelby

St. Patrick (also St. Patricks) is an unincorporated community in northwestern Turtle Creek Township, Shelby County, Ohio, United States. It lies at the intersection of Hoying and Wright-Puthoff Roads, northwest of the city of Sidney, the county seat of Shelby County. Its elevation is 971 feet (296 m) and it is located at 40°22′15″N 84°17′15″W (40.3708815, -84.2874478).

The community of St. Patrick was founded around St. Patrick's Catholic Church, which was established in the area in 1862. Unlike most parts of the heavily Catholic plains of far western Ohio, which were settled primarily by Germans, the population of St. Patrick was predominantly Irish. A post office was established in the community on 22 September 1893; when it was discontinued on 30 June 1904, mail was processed through the post office at Swanders.

Today, St. Patrick is a very small community, due in part to a general decline in the rural population; although the church was placed on the National Register of Historic Places in 1979, it has since closed and been destroyed. A memorial sits at the site of the church.
