= Kettlersville, Ohio =

- Village
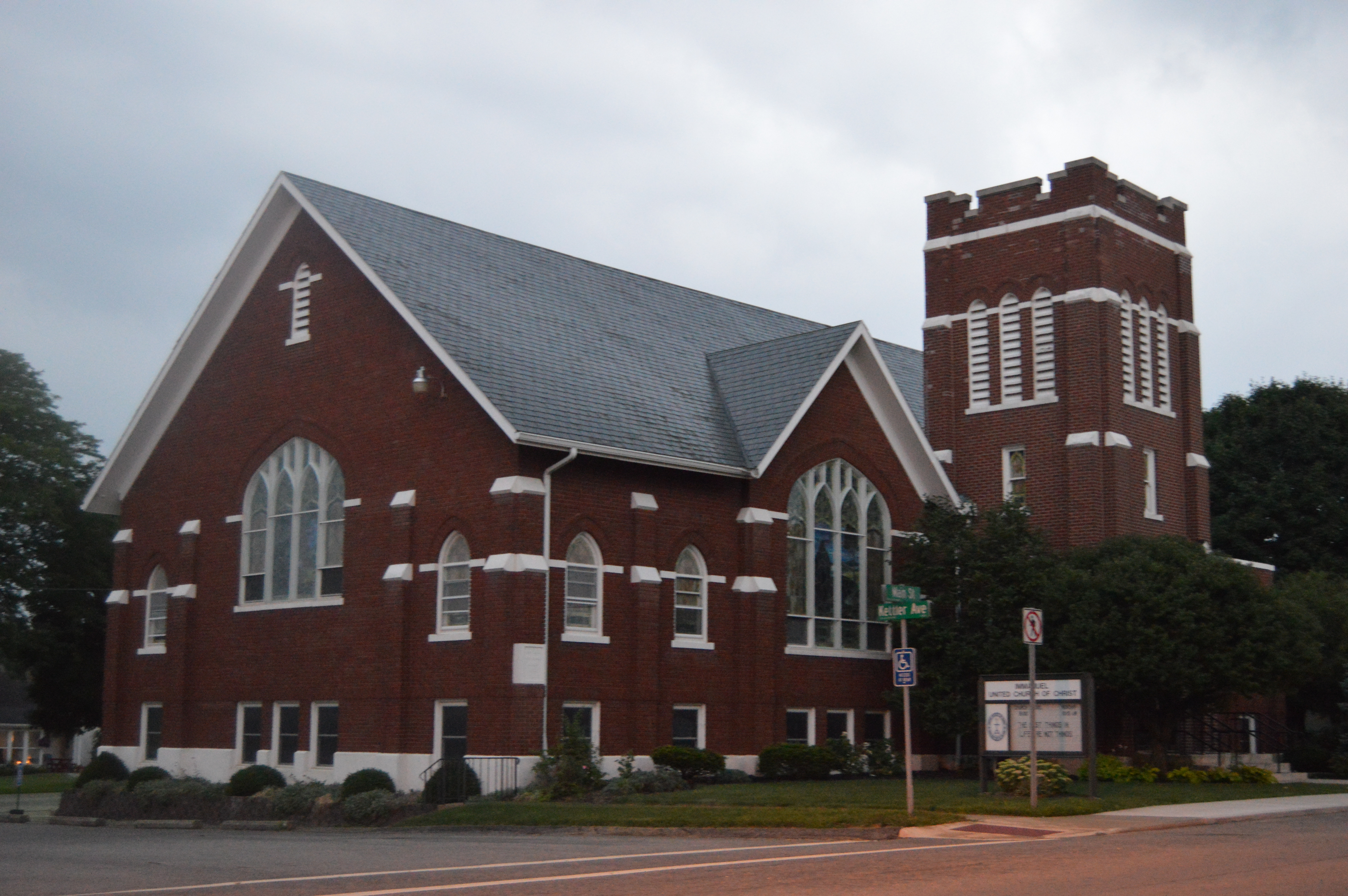
- Immanuel United Church of Christ

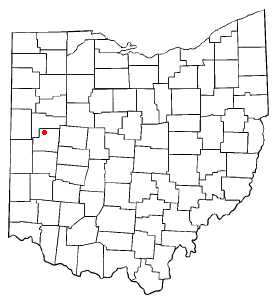
- Location of Kettlersville, Ohio

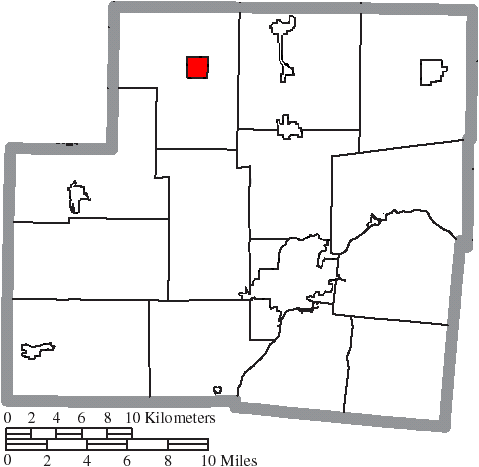
- Location of Kettlersville in Shelby County
- Coordinates: 40°26′20″N 84°15′35″W
- Country: United States
- State: Ohio
- County: Shelby

Area
  - Total: 1.03 sq mi (2.67 km^{2})
  - Land: 1.03 sq mi (2.66 km^{2})
  - Water: 0.0039 sq mi (0.01 km^{2})
- Elevation: 974 ft (297 m)

Population (2020)
  - Total: 164
  - Density: 159.4/sq mi (61.55/km^{2})
- Time zone: UTC-5 (Eastern (EST))
  - Summer (DST): UTC-4 (EDT)
- ZIP code: 45336
- Area codes: 937, 326
- FIPS code: 39-40054
- GNIS feature ID: 2398341

Kettlersville is a village in Shelby County, Ohio, United States. The population was 164 at the 2020 census.

== History ==
Kettlersville was platted in 1873 by Christopher Kettler, and named for him. A post office has been in operation at Kettlersville since 1874.

== Geography ==
According to the United States Census Bureau, the village has a total area of 1.02 square miles (2.64 km^{2}), all land.

== Demographics ==
Historical population
Census	Pop.	Note	%±
1900	145		—
1910	149		2.8%
1920	140		−6.0%
1930	135		−3.6%
1940	131		−3.0%
1950	172		31.3%
1960	209		21.5%
1970	252		20.6%
1980	199		−21.0%
1990	194		−2.5%
2000	175		−9.8%
2010	179		2.3%
2020	164		−8.4%
U.S. Decennial Census

=== 2010 census ===
As of the census of 2010, there were 179 people, 68 households, and 48 families living in the village. The population density was 175.5 inhabitants per square mile (67.8/km^{2}). There were 71 housing units at an average density of 69.6 per square mile (26.9/km^{2}). The racial makeup of the village was 98.9% White and 1.1% Pacific Islander. Hispanic or Latino of any race were 2.2% of the population.

There were 68 households, of which 39.7% had children under the age of 18 living with them, 51.5% were married couples living together, 4.4% had a female householder with no husband present, 14.7% had a male householder with no wife present, and 29.4% were non-families. 26.5% of all households were made up of individuals, and 13.3% had someone living alone who was 65 years of age or older. The average household size was 2.63 and the average family size was 3.19.

The median age in the village was 30.8 years. 30.2% of residents were under the age of 18; 9.4% were between the ages of 18 and 24; 27.9% were from 25 to 44; 19.6% were from 45 to 64; and 12.8% were 65 years of age or older. The gender makeup of the village was 53.6% male and 46.4% female.

=== 2000 census ===
As of the census of 2000, there were 175 people, 60 households, and 46 families living in the village. The population density was 171.5 inhabitants per square mile (66.2/km^{2}). There were 63 housing units at an average density of 61.8 per square mile (23.9/km^{2}). The racial makeup of the village was 98.86% White, 0.57% African American, and 0.57% from two or more races. Hispanic or Latino of any race were 1.71% of the population.

There were 60 households, out of which 48.3% had children under the age of 18 living with them, 65.0% were married couples living together, 6.7% had a female householder with no husband present, and 23.3% were non-families. 23.3% of all households were made up of individuals, and 13.3% had someone living alone who was 65 years of age or older. The average household size was 2.92 and the average family size was 3.39.

In the village, the population was spread out, with 37.1% under the age of 18, 5.1% from 18 to 24, 29.7% from 25 to 44, 14.3% from 45 to 64, and 13.7% who were 65 years of age or older. The median age was 30 years. For every 100 females there were 94.4 males. For every 100 females age 18 and over, there were 93.0 males.

The median income for a household in the village was $50,000, and the median income for a family was $51,250. Males had a median income of $31,500 versus $30,833 for females. The per capita income for the village was $17,167. None of the families and 1.2% of the population were living below the poverty line, including no under eighteens and 8.7% of those over 64.
