= Jackson Township, Shelby County, Ohio =

Township in Ohio, US

- Township
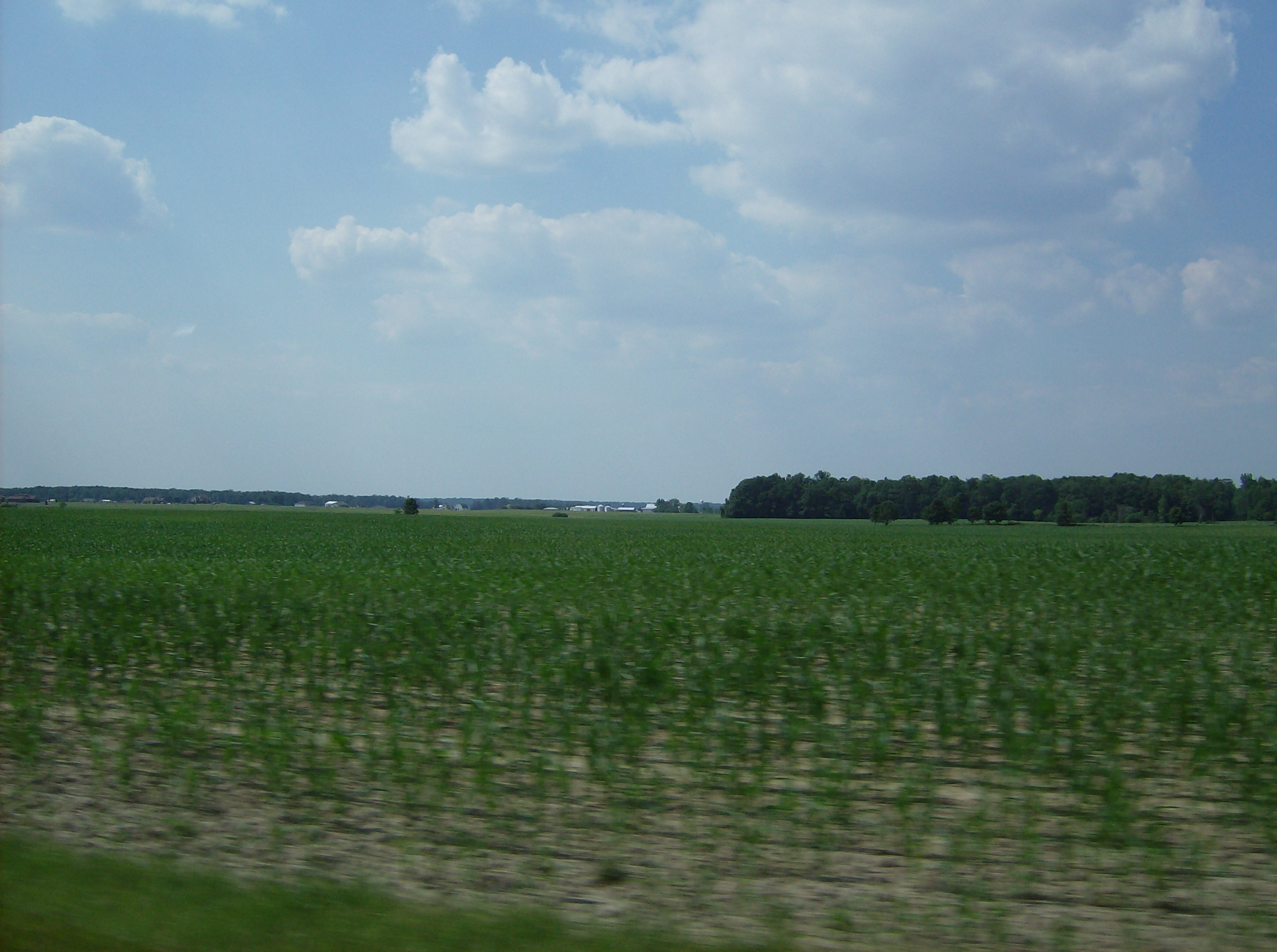
- Farmland in western Jackson Township

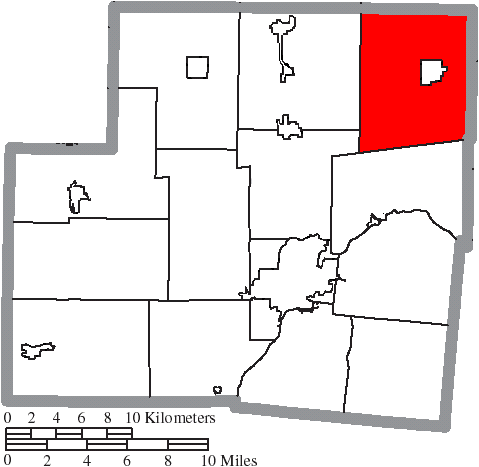
- Location of Jackson Township in Shelby County
- Coordinates: 40°25′59″N 84°2′57″W
- Country: United States
- State: Ohio
- County: Shelby

Area
  - Total: 37.4 sq mi (96.9 km^{2})
  - Land: 37.4 sq mi (96.9 km^{2})
  - Water: 0 sq mi (0.0 km^{2})
- Elevation: 1,027 ft (313 m)

Population (2020)
  - Total: 2,414
  - Density: 64.5/sq mi (24.9/km^{2})
- Time zone: UTC-5 (Eastern (EST))
  - Summer (DST): UTC-4 (EDT)
- FIPS code: 39-38080
- GNIS feature ID: 1086963

Jackson Township is one of the fourteen townships of Shelby County, Ohio, United States. The 2020 census found 2,414 people in the township.

== Geography ==
Located in the northeastern corner of the county, it borders the following townships:

- Clay Township, Auglaize County - north
- Stokes Township, Logan County - northeast
- Bloomfield Township, Logan County - southeast
- Salem Township - south
- Franklin Township - southwest
- Dinsmore Township - west
- Pusheta Township, Auglaize County - northwest corner

The village of Jackson Center is located in central Jackson Township, and the unincorporated community of Montra lies in the township's southwest.

== Name and history ==
Jackson Township was established in 1833. It is one of thirty-seven Jackson Townships statewide.

== Government ==
The township is governed by a three-member board of trustees, who are elected in November of odd-numbered years to a four-year term beginning on the following January 1. Two are elected in the year after the presidential election and one is elected in the year before it. There is also an elected township fiscal officer, who serves a four-year term beginning on April 1 of the year after the election, which is held in November of the year before the presidential election. Vacancies in the fiscal officership or on the board of trustees are filled by the remaining trustees.
