= Anna, Ohio =

- Village
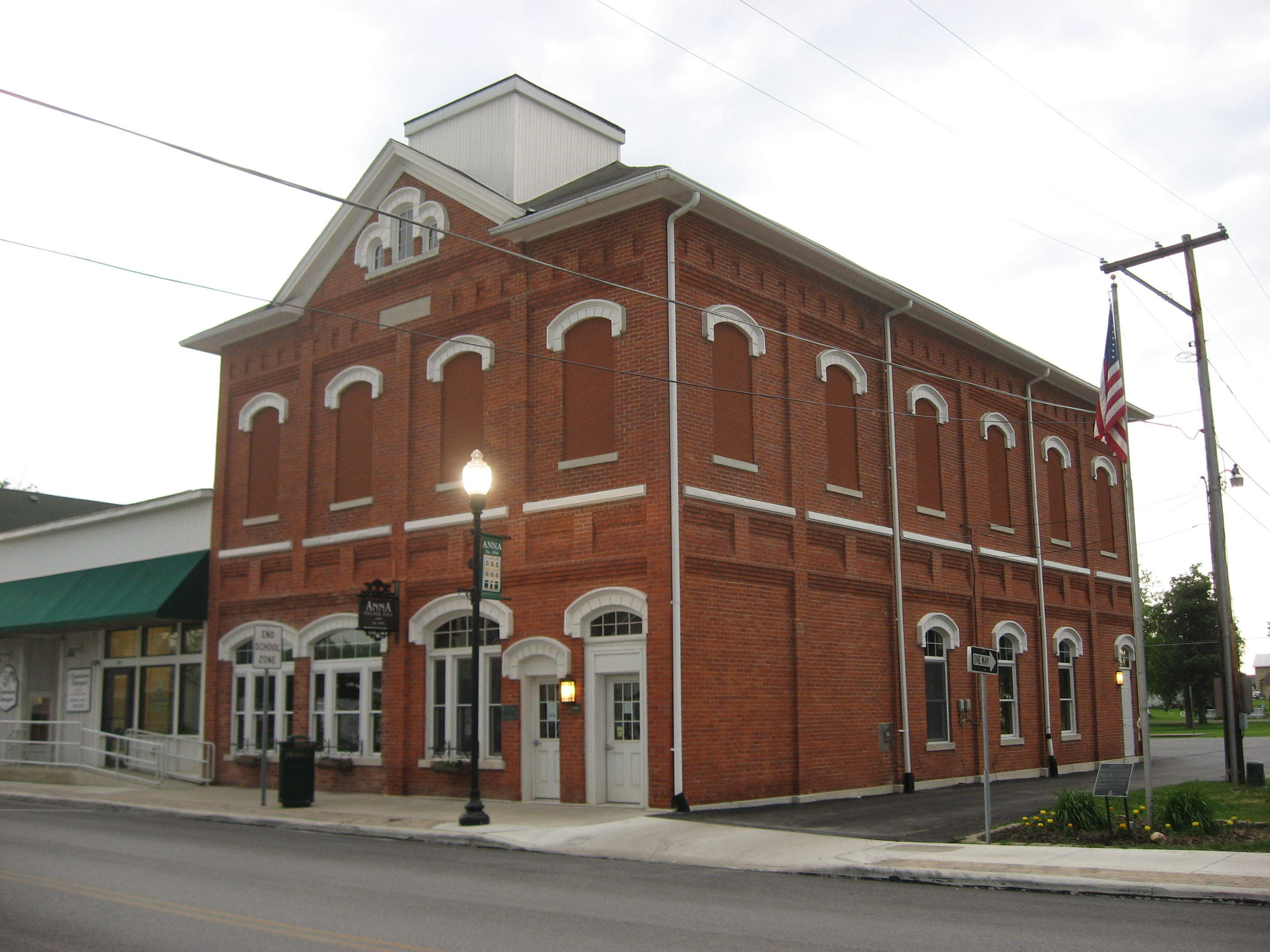
- Anna Town Hall
- Nickname: The Earthquake Capital of Ohio
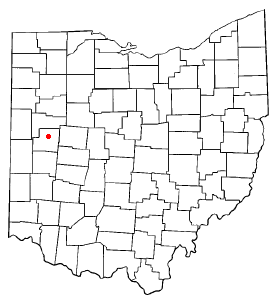
- Location of Anna, Ohio

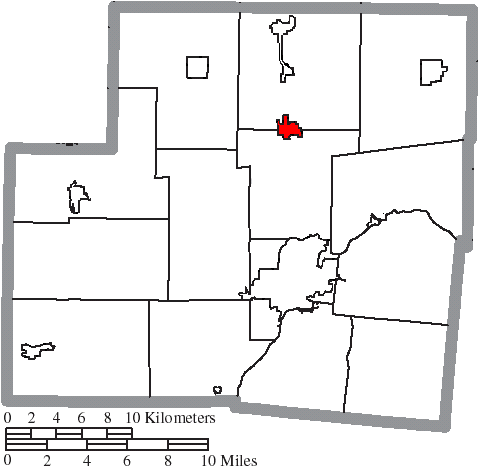
- Location of Anna in Shelby County
- Coordinates: 40°23′42″N 84°10′31″W
- Country: United States
- State: Ohio
- County: Shelby

Government
  - Mayor: Mark Pulfer

Area
  - Total: 1.11 sq mi (2.87 km^{2})
  - Land: 1.11 sq mi (2.87 km^{2})
  - Water: 0 sq mi (0.00 km^{2})
- Elevation: 1,024 ft (312 m)

Population (2020)
  - Total: 1,470
  - Estimate (2023): 1,460
  - Density: 1,326.5/sq mi (512.17/km^{2})
- Time zone: UTC-5 (Eastern (EST))
  - Summer (DST): UTC-4 (EDT)
- ZIP code: 45302
- Area codes: 937, 326
- FIPS code: 39-02092
- GNIS feature ID: 2397963
- Website: Village website

Anna is a village in Shelby County, Ohio, United States. The population was 1,470 at the 2020 census.

== History ==
=== Pre-historical period ===
The prehistoric Teays River ran through modern-day Anna about 2 million years ago. The Teays river deposited loose sediment on the Greenville fault line which created a major earthquake center.

=== Native American period ===
According to the Native Americans, Tecumseh tried to start his alliances in what is now Anna. Most native Shawnee and Miami tribes refused the offer. He supposedly put a curse on the land. The curse stated that the land would be ever plagued with the trembling of the earth.

=== Settlement ===
The first white settlement at Anna was made in the 1830s. Anna was platted in 1868, and named for Anna Thirkield. The village was incorporated in 1877.

=== 1937 earthquakes ===
On March 9, 1937, the largest recorded earthquake in Ohio occurred where the high school and middle school now stand. It was measured at 5.4 on the Richter magnitude scale, while damage was at intensity VIII according to the Mercalli intensity scale. The shock was felt as far away as Chicago, Illinois, and Toronto, Ontario. The shaking followed a similar but somewhat weaker event that had happened a week earlier, on March 2. The Lutheran and Methodist Churches were heavily damaged; the Lutheran Church subsequently put metal braces in its attic to protect it from future earthquakes. The partially damaged school became a total loss for the town and had to be rebuilt. The town hall was so badly damaged that the upper story was condemned and has not been used since.

The Shelby County area has experienced at least 40 earthquakes since 1875.

== Geography ==
According to the United States Census Bureau, the village has a total area of 1.03 square miles (2.67 km^{2}), all land.

== Industry ==
Anna is the location of a Honda of America Manufacturing (HAM) Plant that produces engines and other components for a range of Honda automobiles.

== Education ==
Anna Local Schools is located in two separate buildings: the elementary school is in one, and the middle and Anna High School are in the other.

Anna has a public library, a branch of Shelby County Libraries.

== Demographics ==
Historical population
Census	Pop.	Note	%±
1880	266		—
1890	527		98.1%
1900	451		−14.4%
1910	460		2.0%
1920	463		0.7%
1930	462		−0.2%
1940	485		5.0%
1950	554		14.2%
1960	701		26.5%
1970	792		13.0%
1980	1,038		31.1%
1990	1,164		12.1%
2000	1,319		13.3%
2010	1,567		18.8%
2020	1,470		−6.2%
2023 (est.)	1,460	▼	−0.7%
U.S. Decennial Census

=== 2000 census ===
As of the census of 2000, there were 1,319 people, 474 households, and 365 families living in the village. The population density was 1,576.7 inhabitants per square mile (608.8/km^{2}). There were 483 housing units at an average density of 577.4 per square mile (222.9/km^{2}). The racial makeup of the village was 96.59% White, 0.38% African American, 0.15% Native American, 1.36% Asian, 0.23% Pacific Islander, 0.23% from other races, and 1.06% from two or more races. Hispanic or Latino people of any race were 0.53% of the population.

There were 474 households, out of which 46.2% had children under the age of 18 living with them, 62.0% were married couples living together, 11.4% had a female householder with no husband present, and 22.8% were non-families. 19.6% of all households were made up of individuals, and 6.3% had someone living alone who was 65 years of age or older. The average household size was 2.78 and the average family size was 3.20.

In the village, the population was spread out, with 32.3% under the age of 18, 7.6% from 18 to 24, 33.5% from 25 to 44, 19.3% from 45 to 64, and 7.4% who were 65 years of age or older. The median age was 31 years. For every 100 females there were 99.8 males. For every 100 females age 18 and over, there were 94.1 males.

The median income for a household in the village was $48,676, and the median income for a family was $51,797. Males had a median income of $36,250 versus $25,463 for females. The per capita income for the village was $19,835. About 3.4% of families and 3.6% of the population were below the poverty line, including 2.7% of those under age 18 and 3.8% of those age 65 or over.

=== 2010 census ===
As of the census of 2010, there were 1,567 people, 551 households, and 429 families living in the village. The population density was 1,521.4 inhabitants per square mile (587.4/km^{2}). There were 589 housing units at an average density of 571.8 per square mile (220.8/km^{2}). The racial makeup of the village was 97.4% White, 0.4% African American, 0.4% Native American, 0.2% Asian, 0.1% from other races, and 1.5% from two or more races. Hispanic or Latino people of any race were 0.6% of the population.

There were 551 households, of which 47.5% had children under the age of 18 living with them, 57.4% were married couples living together, 13.8% had a female householder with no husband present, 6.7% had a male householder with no wife present, and 22.1% were non-families. 18.0% of all households were made up of individuals, and 6.7% had someone living alone who was 65 years of age or older. The average household size was 2.84 and the average family size was 3.20.

The median age in the village was 31.1 years. 33.4% of residents were under the age of 18; 7.2% were between the ages of 18 and 24; 30.5% were from 25 to 44; 21.9% were from 45 to 64; and 7.1% were 65 years of age or older. The gender makeup of the village was 48.4% male and 51.6% female.
