= Shelby County, Ohio =

County in Ohio, United States

- County
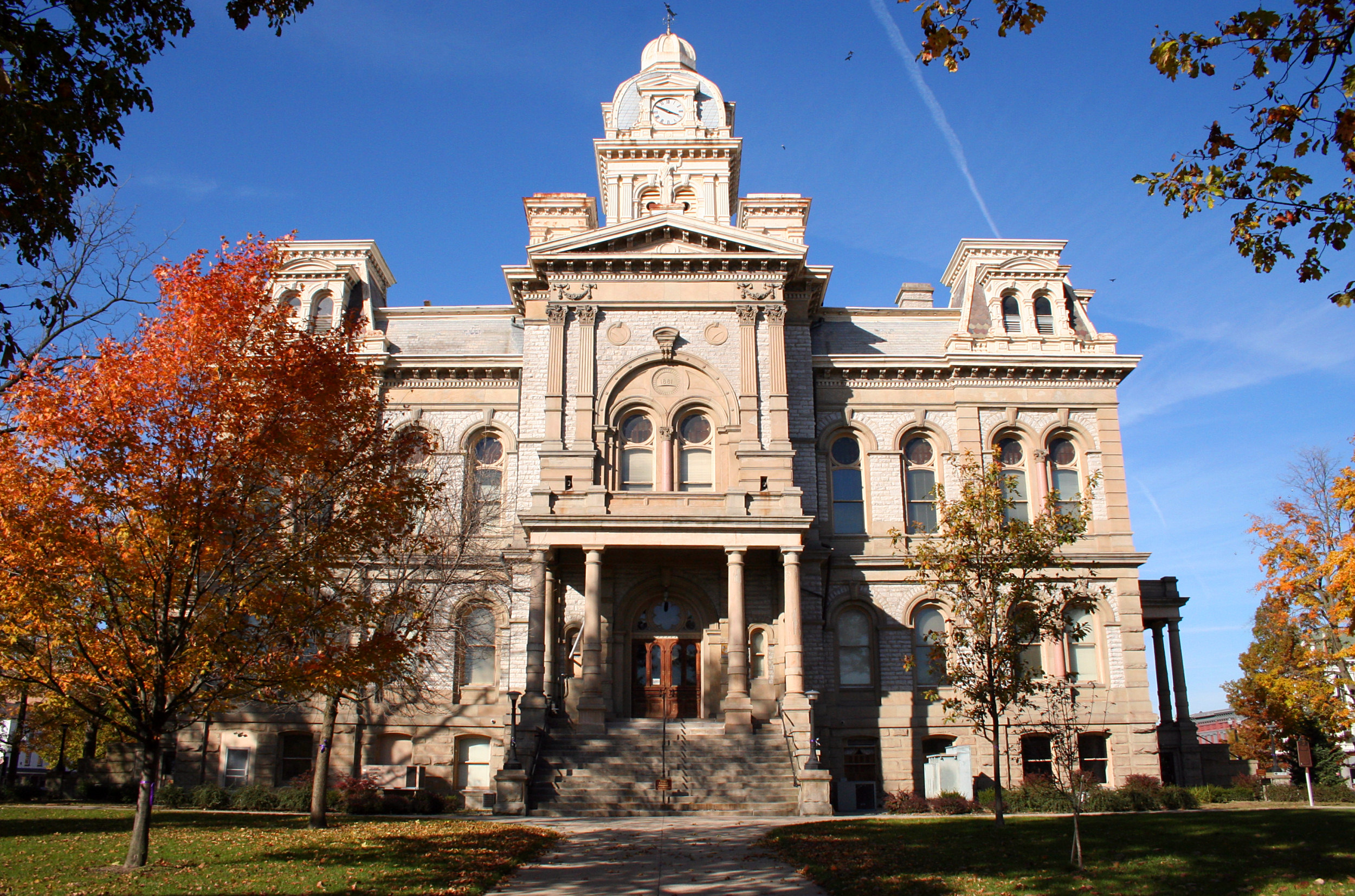
- Shelby County Courthouse

- Flag Seal

- Location within the U.S. state of Ohio
- Coordinates: 40°20′N 84°12′W
- Country: United States
- State: Ohio
- Founded: April 1, 1819
- Named for: Isaac Shelby
- Seat: Sidney
- Largest city: Sidney

Area
  - Total: 411 sq mi (1,060 km^{2})
  - Land: 408 sq mi (1,060 km^{2})
  - Water: 3.0 sq mi (7.8 km^{2}) 0.7%

Population (2020)
  - Total: 48,230
  - Estimate (2025): 48,065 ▼
  - Density: 118/sq mi (45.6/km^{2})
- Time zone: UTC−5 (Eastern)
  - Summer (DST): UTC−4 (EDT)
- Congressional districts: 4th, 15th
- Website: co.shelby.oh.us

Shelby County is a county in the western portion of the U.S. state of Ohio. As of the 2020 United States census, the population was 48,230. Its county seat is Sidney. Its name honors Isaac Shelby, first governor of Kentucky. Shelby County comprises the Sidney, OH Micropolitan Statistical Area, which is also included in the Dayton–Springfield–Sidney, OH Combined Statistical Area.

== History ==
The Algonquian-speaking Shawnee Native Americans had come into the area in the 18th century, displacing the Ojibwa-speaking Ottawa of the Anishinaabeg, a related language group who moved northwest. The Shawnee were joined by the Iroquois, Seneca and Mingo peoples as well, displaced by colonial encroachment to the east. In 1792 the European-American pioneer John Hardin was killed by the Shawnee in Shelby County. Early settlers named the first county seat of Hardin in his memory.

Shelby County was established in 1819 from Miami County. Its original boundary included Minster and New Bremen; these were included in Auglaize County when it was created in 1848 from Shelby and Allen counties.

Several towns in Shelby County were established by German immigrants. The Miami and Erie Canal, which reached Shelby County in 1841, provided jobs for many of the county's European immigrants. It also changed the way new immigrants traveled to Shelby County from Cincinnati in the south and by 1845, Lake Erie in the north. The actual construction provided the initial boost; the real benefit proved to be the opportunity for increased commerce presented by this new transportation link. The canal brought a business boom which in turn drove farm product prices to previously unknown heights. As German immigrants arrived to work on the canal, on the land, and in the shops, business in Sidney and Shelby County expanded. The Germans' penchant for thrift proved to be a valuable asset to the area's economic and social growth. Sidney's population increased from 713 in 1840 to 1,284 by 1850. During this period, the residents’ national origins went from being almost entirely English, or of English descent, to at least fifty percent German and Alsatian French. There were also many families from England who arrived as immigrants in the 19th century. Those English immigrants were of working class rural origins; it was easier for working-class people to own land in America and by this time parts of the United States also had the practice of universal male suffrage so all white men over the age of 18, regardless of property or wealth were allowed to vote. These factors encouraged English immigration, particularly from the villages of Penkridge, Gailey, Lapley, Wheaton Aston, Bishop's Wood, Brewood, Coven, Featherstone, Essington, Four Ashes, Perton, Pattingham, Seisdon, Wombourne, Himley, Swindon and Enville, in south Staffordshire in central England, and for this reason these immigrants were sometimes known as "the Staffordshire settlers".

In 1846, a group of 383 free blacks from Virginia, called the "Randolph Slaves", settled in the county, most at Rumley, Ohio. They had been freed by the 1833 will of Virginia planter John Randolph of Roanoke. He provided money for their transportation and resettlement on land in a free state. Their gaining freedom was delayed by court challenges to Randolph's will, but the families were freed and traveled in 1846. Randolph had provided that those over the age of 40 were given 10 acres each for resettlement. A contemporary history described the Rumley settlement: "There are 400 Negroes (half the population of Van Buren Township) as prosperous as their white neighbors and equal to the whites in morals, religion and intelligence." In 1900 survivors and descendants formed Randolph Ex-Slaves Association (later Randolph Slave Association) and held their first reunion at Midway Park near Piqua. Sixty-two of the original settlers attended who had been born in Virginia into slavery. After being manumitted, they had come to Ohio as small children with their families. They were called the "Old Dominions" after the nickname of Virginia; the "Buckeyes" were those descendants born in Ohio. Over the years, the reunions were also held at Troy and the Shelby County Fairgrounds, with 100–300 attending.

== Geography ==
Terrain of Shelby County consists of low rolling hills, entirely devoted to agriculture or urban development. The Great Miami River enters from Logan County near the county's midpoint, and flows west-southwest-southward to exit into Miami County near the midpoint of its south borderline. The county's highest point (1,149 ft; 350 m ASL) is at its SE corner, where it abuts Champaign and Miami counties. According to the United States Census Bureau, the county has a total area of 411 square miles (1,060 km^{2}), of which 408 square miles (1,060 km^{2}) is land and 3.0 square miles (7.8 km^{2}) (0.7%) is water.

=== Adjacent counties ===
- Auglaize County – north
- Logan County – east
- Champaign County – southeast
- Miami County – south
- Darke County – west
- Mercer County – northwest

== Demographics ==
Historical population
Census	Pop.	Note	%±
1820	2,106		—
1830	3,671		74.3%
1840	12,154		231.1%
1850	13,958		14.8%
1860	17,493		25.3%
1870	20,748		18.6%
1880	24,137		16.3%
1890	24,707		2.4%
1900	24,625		−0.3%
1910	24,663		0.2%
1920	25,923		5.1%
1930	24,924		−3.9%
1940	26,071		4.6%
1950	28,488		9.3%
1960	33,586		17.9%
1970	37,748		12.4%
1980	43,089		14.1%
1990	44,915		4.2%
2000	47,910		6.7%
2010	49,423		3.2%
2020	48,230		−2.4%
2025 (est.)	48,065	▼	−0.3%
US Decennial Census; 1790-1960 1900-1990; 1990-2000 2020

=== 2020 census ===
As of the 2020 census, the county had a population of 48,230. The median age was 40.2 years. 24.8% of residents were under the age of 18 and 17.4% of residents were 65 years of age or older. For every 100 females there were 100.7 males, and for every 100 females age 18 and over there were 98.8 males age 18 and over.

The racial makeup of the county was 91.8% White, 1.8% Black or African American, 0.2% American Indian and Alaska Native, 0.9% Asian, 0.1% Native Hawaiian and Pacific Islander, 0.9% from some other race, and 4.3% from two or more races. Hispanic or Latino residents of any race comprised 1.6% of the population.

43.0% of residents lived in urban areas, while 57.0% lived in rural areas.

There were 18,803 households in the county, of which 30.7% had children under the age of 18 living in them. Of all households, 52.9% were married-couple households, 18.2% were households with a male householder and no spouse or partner present, and 22.2% were households with a female householder and no spouse or partner present. About 26.5% of all households were made up of individuals and 11.4% had someone living alone who was 65 years of age or older.

There were 20,059 housing units, of which 6.3% were vacant. Among occupied housing units, 72.1% were owner-occupied and 27.9% were renter-occupied. The homeowner vacancy rate was 1.3% and the rental vacancy rate was 6.4%.

=== Racial and ethnic composition ===
Shelby County, Ohio – Racial and ethnic composition Note: the US Census treats Hispanic/Latino as an ethnic category. This table excludes Latinos from the racial categories and assigns them to a separate category. Hispanics/Latinos may be of any race.
Race / Ethnicity (NH = Non-Hispanic)	Pop 1980	Pop 1990	Pop 2000	Pop 2010	Pop 2020	% 1980	% 1990	% 2000	% 2010	% 2020
White alone (NH)	42,285	43,673	45,769	46,423	44,067	98.13%	97.23%	95.53%	93.93%	91.37%
Black or African American alone (NH)	500	613	710	928	839	1.16%	1.36%	1.48%	1.88%	1.74%
Native American or Alaska Native alone (NH)	13	47	70	76	81	0.03%	0.10%	0.15%	0.15%	0.17%
Asian alone (NH)	74	382	459	421	450	0.17%	0.85%	0.96%	0.85%	0.93%
Native Hawaiian or Pacific Islander alone (NH)	x	x	25	48	29	x	x	0.05%	0.10%	0.06%
Other race alone (NH)	36	15	32	45	188	0.08%	0.03%	0.07%	0.09%	0.39%
Mixed race or Multiracial (NH)	x	x	462	821	1,789	x	x	0.96%	1.66%	3.71%
Hispanic or Latino (any race)	181	185	383	661	787	0.42%	0.41%	0.80%	1.34%	1.63%
Total	43,089	44,915	47,910	49,423	48,230	100.00%	100.00%	100.00%	100.00%	100.00%

=== 2010 census ===
As of the 2010 United States census, there were 49,423 people, 18,467 households, and 13,409 families in the county. The population density was 121.2 inhabitants per square mile (46.8/km^{2}). There were 20,173 housing units at an average density of 49.5 per square mile (19.1/km^{2}). The racial makeup of the county was 94.7% white, 1.9% black or African American, 0.9% Asian, 0.2% American Indian, 0.1% Pacific islander, 0.5% from other races, and 1.9% from two or more races. Those of Hispanic or Latino origin made up 1.3% of the population. In terms of ancestry, 39.8% were German, 11.0% were Irish, 9.2% were American, and 7.8% were English.

Of the 18,467 households, 36.0% had children under the age of 18 living with them, 56.9% were married couples living together, 10.4% had a female householder with no husband present, 27.4% were non-families, and 23.0% of all households were made up of individuals. The average household size was 2.64 and the average family size was 3.09. The median age was 37.9 years.

The median income for a household in the county was $48,475 and the median income for a family was $58,473. Males had a median income of $41,924 versus $30,487 for females. The per capita income for the county was $21,948. About 8.9% of families and 11.9% of the population were below the poverty line, including 18.1% of those under age 18 and 7.5% of those age 65 or over.

=== 2000 census ===
As of the 2000 United States census, there were 49,423 people, 18,488 households, and 2.63 persons per household, with 20,185 housing units. The county's racial makeup was 95.1% White, 2.1% Black or African American, 0.2% Native American, 1.0% Asian, 0.1% Pacific Islander, 1.4% from other races, and 1.6% from two or more races. 0.1% of the population were Hispanic or Latino of any race.

There were 18,488 households, out of which 36.90% had children under the age of 18 living with them, 60.70% were married couples living together, 9.30% had a female householder with no husband present, and 25.80% were non-families. 22.00% of all households were made up of individuals, and 8.90% had someone living alone who was 65 years of age or older. The average household size was 2.63 and the average family size was 3.13.

The county population contained 28.60% under the age of 18, 8.20% from 18 to 24, 29.30% from 25 to 44, 21.70% from 45 to 64, and 12.20% who were 65 years of age or older. The median age was 35 years. For every 100 females there were 98.60 males. For every 100 females age 18 and over, there were 96.40 males.

The median income for a household in the county was $48,475, and the median income for a family was $51,331. Males had a median income of $36,212 versus $24,470 for females. The per capita income for the county was $20,255. About 5.30% of families and 6.70% of the population were below the poverty line, including 8.30% of those under age 18 and 5.30% of those age 65 or over.

== Politics ==
Prior to 1940, Shelby County was a Democratic stronghold in presidential elections, with every Democratic presidential candidate from 1856 to 1936 aside from Al Smith in 1928. But starting with the 1940 election, the county has become a Republican stronghold in presidential elections, with Harry S. Truman in 1948 and Lyndon B. Johnson in 1964 being the lone Democrats to win the county since then.

United States presidential election results for Shelby County, Ohio
Year	Republican		Democratic		Third party(ies)	
Year	No.	%	No.	%	No.	%
1856	1,356	46.30%	1,446	49.37%	127	4.34%
1860	1,597	48.29%	1,669	50.47%	41	1.24%
1864	1,602	44.18%	2,024	55.82%	0	0.00%
1868	1,626	41.69%	2,274	58.31%	0	0.00%
1872	1,717	42.44%	2,311	57.12%	18	0.44%
1876	1,985	38.72%	3,141	61.28%	0	0.00%
1880	2,274	40.51%	3,320	59.14%	20	0.36%
1884	2,420	40.64%	3,496	58.71%	39	0.65%
1888	2,447	39.67%	3,597	58.32%	124	2.01%
1892	2,062	37.07%	3,244	58.32%	256	4.60%
1896	2,488	38.35%	3,941	60.74%	59	0.91%
1900	2,482	38.67%	3,837	59.78%	100	1.56%
1904	2,737	44.72%	3,286	53.69%	97	1.58%
1908	2,646	40.06%	3,879	58.73%	80	1.21%
1912	1,613	27.33%	3,305	56.00%	984	16.67%
1916	2,352	37.33%	3,801	60.32%	148	2.35%
1920	5,452	48.78%	5,642	50.48%	82	0.73%
1924	4,359	44.41%	4,840	49.31%	617	6.29%
1928	5,975	52.14%	5,448	47.54%	37	0.32%
1932	4,281	33.60%	8,299	65.14%	161	1.26%
1936	4,482	33.68%	7,110	53.43%	1,715	12.89%
1940	7,130	53.87%	6,105	46.13%	0	0.00%
1944	7,084	55.75%	5,622	44.25%	0	0.00%
1948	5,406	43.68%	6,939	56.06%	32	0.26%
1952	8,957	62.68%	5,333	37.32%	0	0.00%
1956	9,452	67.67%	4,515	32.33%	0	0.00%
1960	8,766	56.08%	6,866	43.92%	0	0.00%
1964	5,190	34.16%	10,004	65.84%	0	0.00%
1968	7,248	47.60%	6,479	42.55%	1,499	9.85%
1972	9,089	61.82%	4,721	32.11%	893	6.07%
1976	8,011	53.91%	6,414	43.17%	434	2.92%
1980	8,988	54.33%	6,425	38.84%	1,131	6.84%
1984	13,509	75.12%	4,315	23.99%	159	0.88%
1988	12,198	70.00%	5,065	29.07%	162	0.93%
1992	8,854	44.25%	5,262	26.30%	5,895	29.46%
1996	8,773	47.78%	6,729	36.65%	2,860	15.58%
2000	12,476	63.43%	6,593	33.52%	601	3.06%
2004	16,204	70.90%	6,535	28.59%	116	0.51%
2008	15,924	67.14%	7,316	30.85%	478	2.02%
2012	17,142	71.71%	6,343	26.54%	418	1.75%
2016	18,590	78.01%	4,243	17.81%	996	4.18%
2020	20,422	80.74%	4,465	17.65%	406	1.61%
2024	20,740	81.78%	4,350	17.15%	272	1.07%

United States Senate election results for Shelby County, Ohio1
Year	Republican		Democratic		Third party(ies)	
Year	No.	%	No.	%	No.	%
2024	19,275	76.88%	4,927	19.65%	868	3.46%

== Communities ==
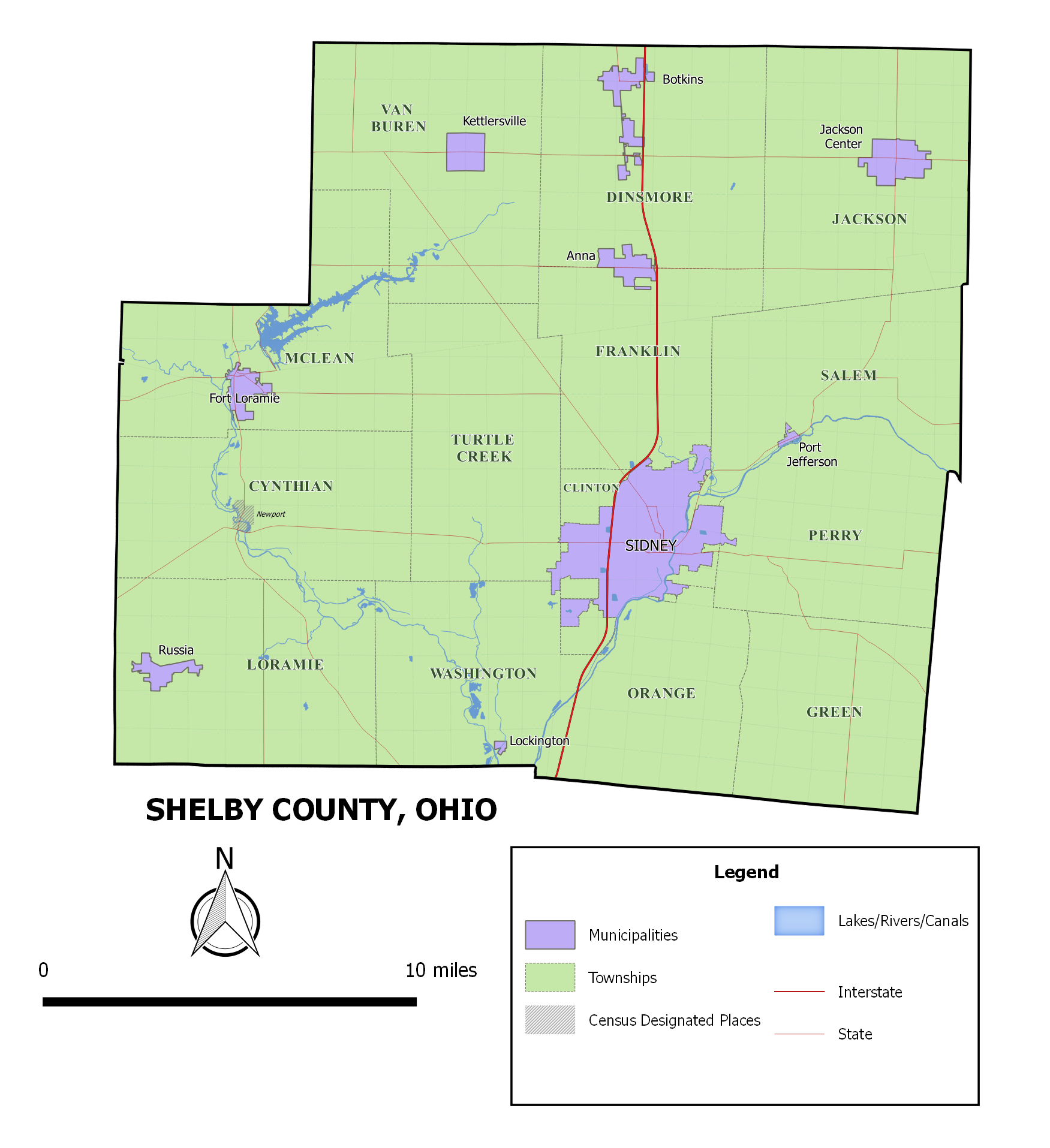
Municipalities and townships of Shelby County

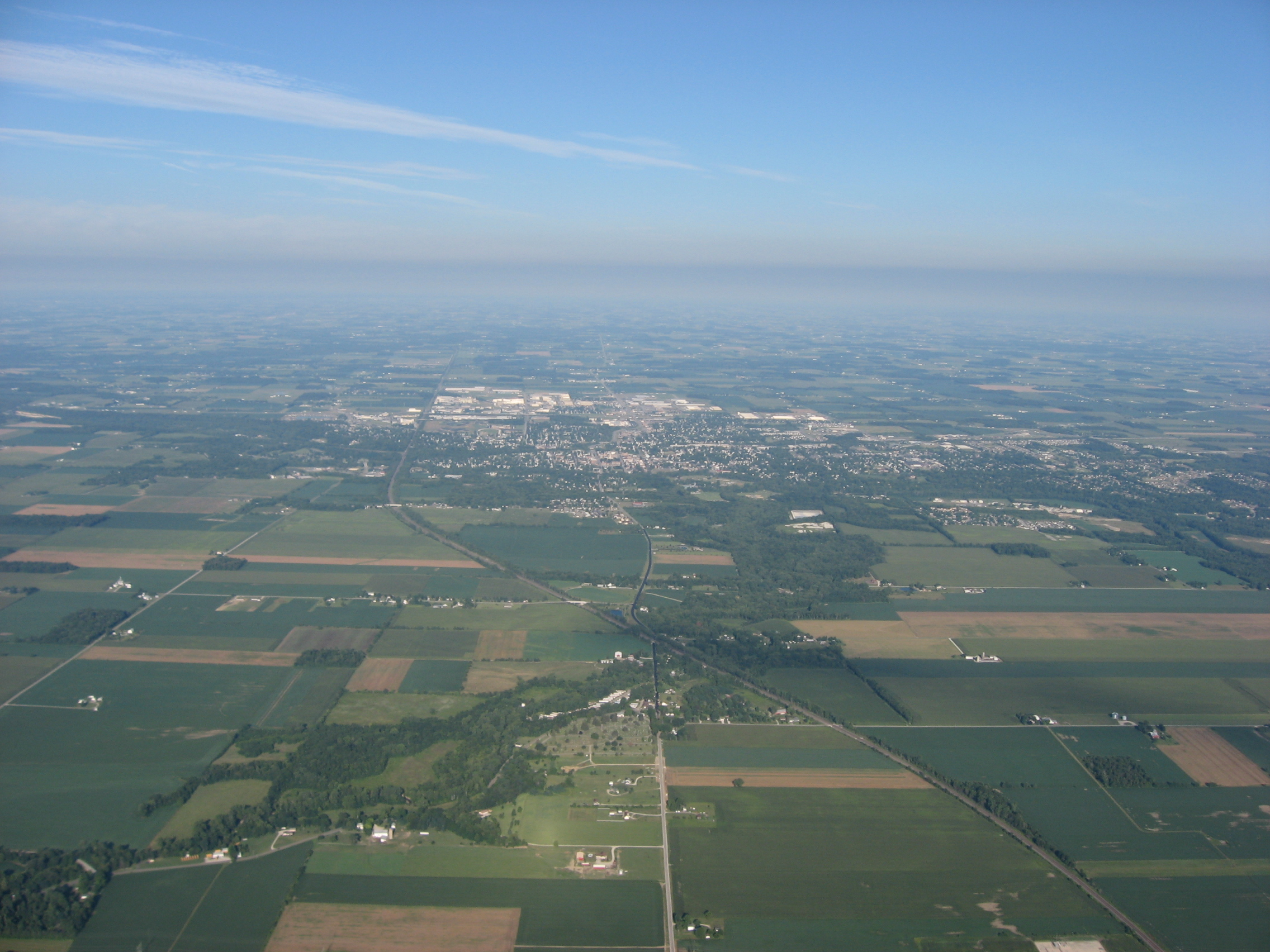
Sidney as seen from the east

=== City ===
- Sidney (county seat)

=== Villages ===
- Anna
- Botkins
- Fort Loramie
- Jackson Center
- Kettlersville
- Lockington
- Minster (part)
- Port Jefferson
- Russia

=== Townships ===
- Clinton
- Cynthian
- Dinsmore
- Franklin
- Green
- Jackson
- Loramie
- McLean
- Orange
- Perry
- Salem
- Turtle Creek
- Van Buren
- Washington

=== Census-designated places ===
- Newport

=== Unincorporated communities ===
- Ballou
- Dawson
- Depew
- Hardin
- Houston
- Kirkwood
- Maplewood
- McCartyville
- Montra
- Mount Jefferson
- Newbern
- Oran
- Pasco
- Pemberton
- Plattsville
- Rumley
- St. Patrick
- Swanders
- Tawawa
- Uno

== Notable people ==
- Jared Hoying, professional baseball player
- Paul Lauterbur, chemist and Nobel Prize laureate
- J. Edward Russell, former U.S. Representative from Ohio
- Bill Steinkemper, American football player

== See also ==
- National Register of Historic Places listings in Shelby County, Ohio
