= Clinton Township, Minnesota =

Clinton Township is the name of some places in the U.S. state of Minnesota:

- Clinton Township, Rock County, Minnesota
- Clinton Township, St. Louis County, Minnesota

== See also ==
- Clinton Township (disambiguation)
