= Clinton Township =

Clinton Township may refer to:

== Illinois ==
- Clinton Township, DeKalb County, Illinois

== Indiana ==
- Clinton Township, Boone County, Indiana
- Clinton Township, Cass County, Indiana
- Clinton Township, Decatur County, Indiana
- Clinton Township, Elkhart County, Indiana
- Clinton Township, LaPorte County, Indiana
- Clinton Township, Putnam County, Indiana
- Clinton Township, Vermillion County, Indiana

== Iowa ==
- Clinton Township, Linn County, Iowa
- Clinton Township, Ringgold County, Iowa
- Clinton Township, Sac County, Iowa
- Clinton Township, Wayne County, Iowa

== Kansas ==
- Clinton Township, Douglas County, Kansas

== Michigan ==
- Clinton Township, Lenawee County, Michigan
- Clinton Township, Macomb County, Michigan
- Clinton Township, Oscoda County, Michigan

== Minnesota ==
- Clinton Township, Rock County, Minnesota
- Clinton Township, St. Louis County, Minnesota

== Missouri ==
- Clinton Township, Clinton County, Missouri
- Clinton Township, Douglas County, Missouri, in Douglas County, Missouri
- Clinton Township, Henry County, Missouri
- Clinton Township, Texas County, Missouri

== New Jersey ==
- Clinton Township, New Jersey, in Hunterdon County
- Clinton Township, Essex County, New Jersey, defunct

== North Dakota ==
- Clinton Township, Divide County, North Dakota

== Ohio ==
- Clinton Township, Franklin County, Ohio
- Clinton Township, Fulton County, Ohio
- Clinton Township, Knox County, Ohio
- Clinton Township, Seneca County, Ohio
- Clinton Township, Shelby County, Ohio
- Clinton Township, Vinton County, Ohio
- Clinton Township, Wayne County, Ohio

== Pennsylvania ==
- Clinton Township, Butler County, Pennsylvania
- Clinton Township, Lycoming County, Pennsylvania
- Clinton Township, Venango County, Pennsylvania
- Clinton Township, Wayne County, Pennsylvania
- Clinton Township, Wyoming County, Pennsylvania

== South Dakota ==
- Clinton Township, Miner County, South Dakota, in Miner County, South Dakota
