= Clinton Township, Indiana =

Clinton Township is the name of seven townships in the U.S. state of Indiana:

- Clinton Township, Boone County, Indiana
- Clinton Township, Cass County, Indiana
- Clinton Township, Decatur County, Indiana
- Clinton Township, Elkhart County, Indiana
- Clinton Township, LaPorte County, Indiana
- Clinton Township, Putnam County, Indiana
- Clinton Township, Vermillion County, Indiana

== See also ==
- Clinton Township (disambiguation)
