= Versailles Town Hall and Wayne Township House =

- U.S. National Register of Historic Places
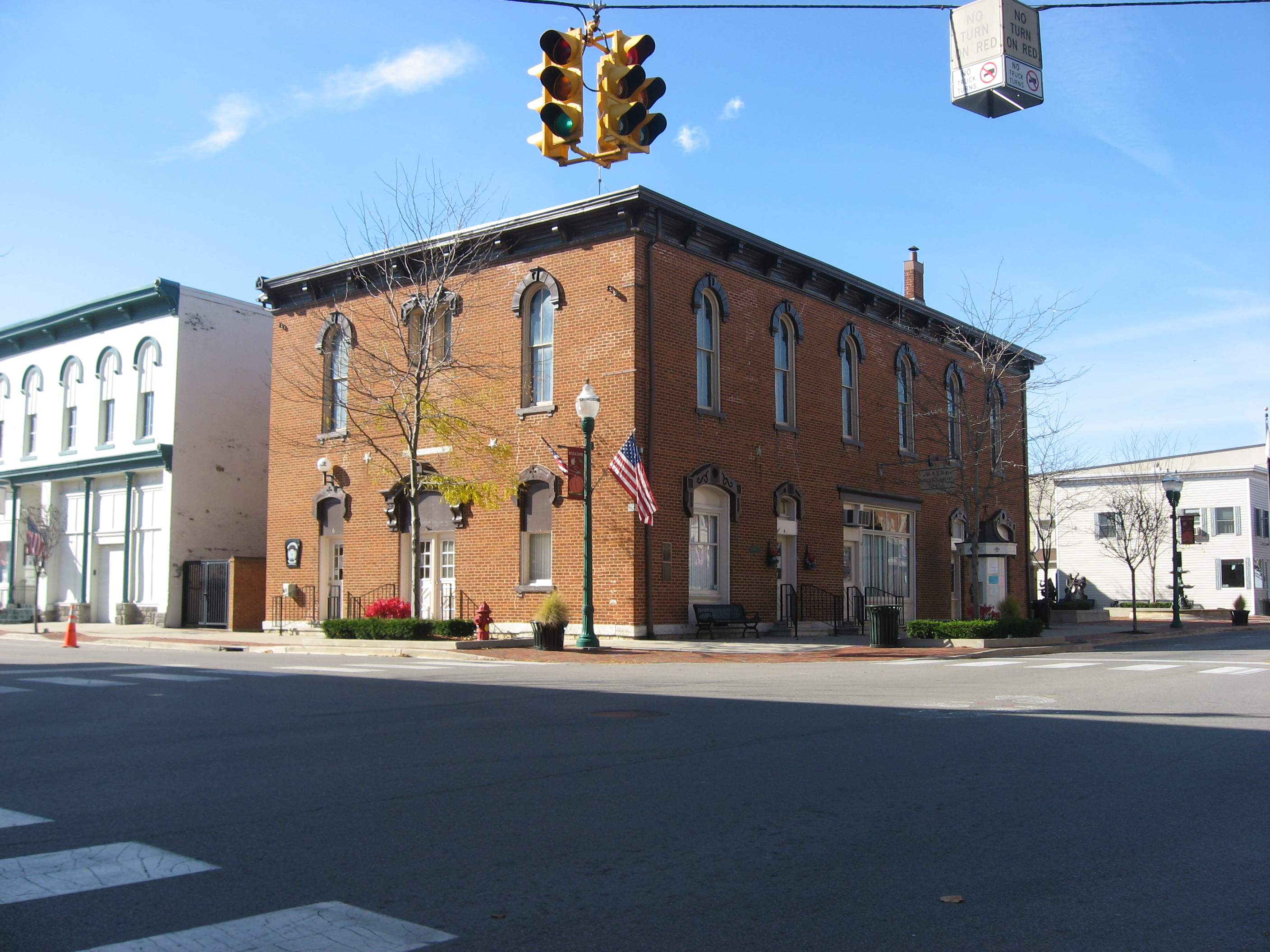
- View from across the street

- Location within Ohio Location within the United States
- Location: 4 W. Main St., Versailles, Ohio
- Coordinates: 40°13′20″N 84°29′6″W
- Area: less than one acre
- Built: 1876
- Architect: James C. Goodall
- Architectural style: Italianate
- NRHP reference No.: 81000432
- Added to NRHP: February 18, 1981

The Versailles Town Hall and Wayne Township House, located at 4 West Main Street in Versailles, Ohio, in the United States, is an historic brick town hall building built between 1875 and 1876 by joint resolution of the Versailles Village Council and the Wayne Township Trustees. It is also known as the Versailles Village Hall. On February 18, 1981, it was added to the National Register of Historic Places.

== History ==
During June and July, 1875, the Versailles Village Council and the Wayne Township Trustees met and agreed to build a structure to be called the Versailles Town Hall and Wayne Township House, for the joint use of both governmental bodies. Completed by local builders in the following year, it served originally as the jail and fire station, and also included in the building were community meeting rooms and a theater. Among the most distinctive features of the building's architecture are large double doors at the entrance, topped with a prominent transom. Such a structure is quite uncommon in the villages of western Ohio, where fine Italianate town halls are very rare.

The Town Hall and Township House was one of the few structures to survive a massive fire that destroyed most of downtown Versailles in 1901. Today, the building houses the village's municipal offices, police department, and rescue squad. It was listed on the National Register of Historic Places in 1981 because of its place in local history and because of its well-preserved historic architecture.
