= Versailles, Ohio =

- Village
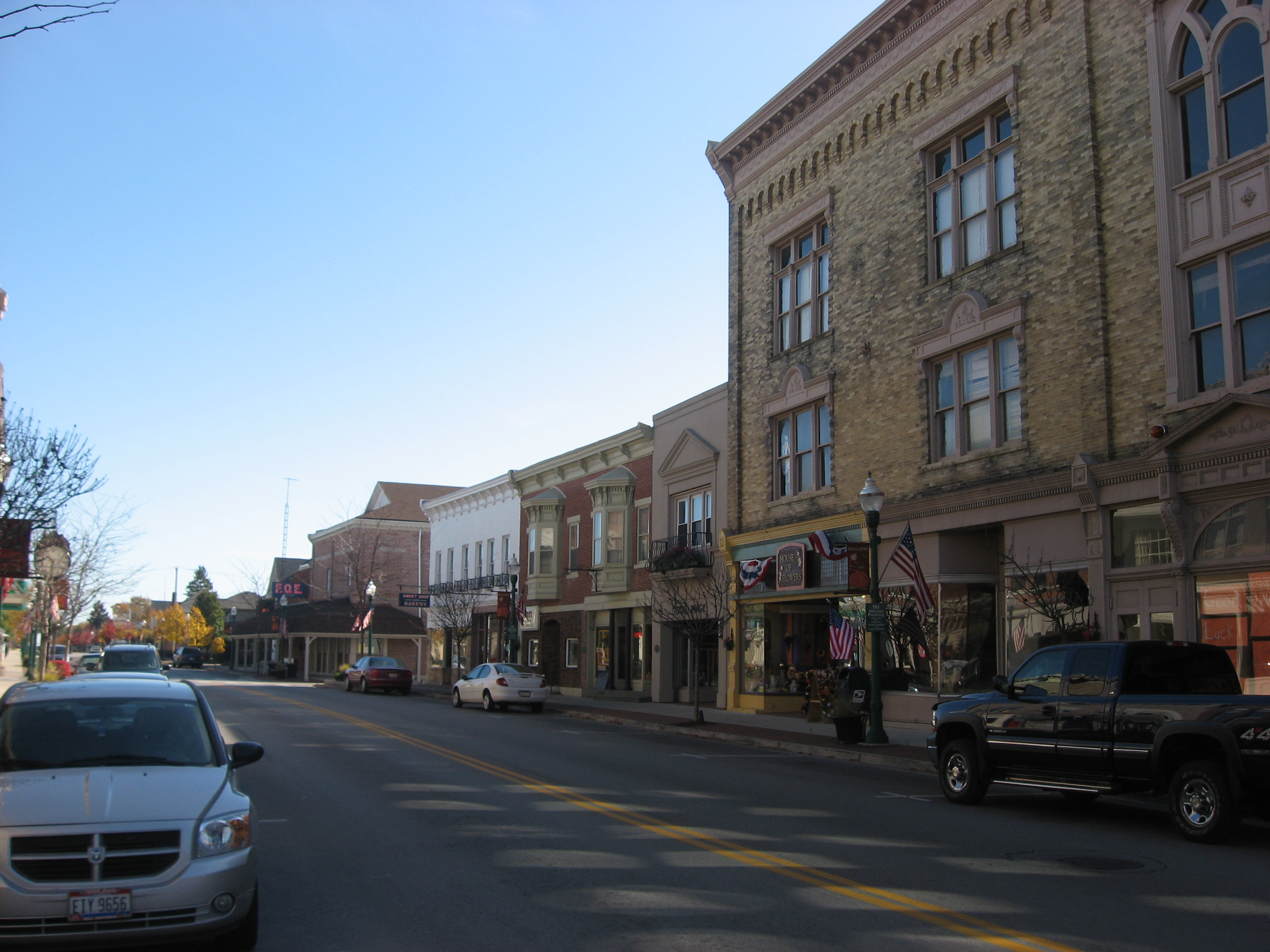
- Main Street in Versailles
- Motto: "People - Pride - Progress"
- Location in Darke County and the state of Ohio

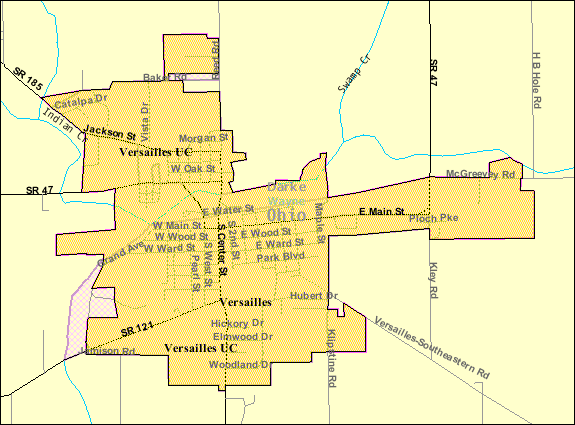
- Detailed map of Versailles
- Coordinates: 40°13′15″N 84°29′46″W
- Country: United States
- State: Ohio
- County: Darke

Government
  - Mayor: Todd Dammeyer

Area
  - Total: 2.02 sq mi (5.22 km^{2})
  - Land: 2.01 sq mi (5.20 km^{2})
  - Water: 0.0077 sq mi (0.02 km^{2})
- Elevation: 981 ft (299 m)

Population (2020)
  - Total: 2,692
  - Density: 1,340.9/sq mi (517.71/km^{2})
- Time zone: UTC-5 (Eastern (EST))
  - Summer (DST): UTC-4 (EDT)
- ZIP code: 45380
- Area codes: 937, 326
- FIPS code: 39-79912
- GNIS feature ID: 2400066
- Website: Village website

Versailles (/vərˈseɪlz/ vər-SAYLZ) is a village in Darke County, Ohio, United States. It is the only village in Wayne Township. The population was 2,692 at the 2020 census.

== History ==
Founded in 1819, the village is named after the city of Versailles in France. Versailles was originally named Jacksonville, in honor of Andrew Jackson and his victory at the Battle of New Orleans. Later on, as a large number of early residents were of French descent, it was suggested that the village's name be changed to "Versailles" in memory of their homeland. Versailles became the new name of the village in 1837.

== Geography ==
According to the United States Census Bureau, the village has a total area of 1.88 square miles (4.87 km^{2}), of which 1.87 square miles (4.84 km^{2}) is land and 0.01 square miles (0.03 km^{2}) is water.

== Demographics ==
Historical population
| Census | Pop. | Note | %± |
|---|---|---|---|
| 1880 | 1,163 | | — |
| 1890 | 1,385 | | 19.1% |
| 1900 | 1,478 | | 6.7% |
| 1910 | 1,580 | | 6.9% |
| 1920 | 1,563 | | −1.1% |
| 1930 | 1,465 | | −6.3% |
| 1940 | 1,711 | | 16.8% |
| 1950 | 1,812 | | 5.9% |
| 1960 | 2,159 | | 19.2% |
| 1970 | 2,441 | | 13.1% |
| 1980 | 2,384 | | −2.3% |
| 1990 | 2,351 | | −1.4% |
| 2000 | 2,589 | | 10.1% |
| 2010 | 2,687 | | 3.8% |
| 2020 | 2,692 | | 0.2% |
U.S. Decennial Census

=== 2010 census ===
As of the census of 2010, there were 2,687 people, 1,083 households, and 686 families living in the village. The population density was 1,436.9 inhabitants per square mile (554.8/km^{2}). There were 1,150 housing units at an average density of 615.0 per square mile (237.5/km^{2}). The racial makeup of the village was 99.0% White, 0.2% African American, 0.1% Native American, 0.1% from other races, and 0.7% from two or more races. Hispanic or Latino of any race were 0.6% of the population. 45.9% were of German, 33.8% French, and 11.0% Irish ancestries.

There were 1,083 households, of which 32.4% had children under the age of 18 living with them, 52.2% were married couples living together, 7.8% had a female householder with no husband present, 3.4% had a male householder with no wife present, and 36.7% were non-families. 33.4% of all households were made up of individuals, and 14.6% had someone living alone who was 65 years of age or older. The average household size was 2.39, and the average family size was 3.06.

The median age in the village was 39.8 years. 25.9% of residents were under the age of 18; 5.9% were between the ages of 18 and 24; 24.6% were from 25 to 44; 24.2% were from 45 to 64, and 19.4% were 65 years of age or older. The gender makeup of the village was 47.7% male and 52.3% female.

=== 2000 census ===
As of the census of 2000, there were 2,589 people, 1,061 households, and 687 families living in the village. The population density was 1,482.5 inhabitants per square mile (572.4/km^{2}). There were 1,109 housing units at an average density of 635.0 per square mile (245.2/km^{2}). The racial makeup of the village was 99.38% White, 0.04% African American, 0.12% Native American, 0.08% Asian, 0.12% from other races, and 0.27% from two or more races. Hispanic or Latino of any race were 0.12% of the population.

There were 1,061 households, out of which 31.6% had children under the age of 18 living with them, 54.5% were married couples living together, 7.6% had a female householder with no husband present, and 35.2% were non-families. 32.4% of all households were made up of individuals, and 16.0% had someone living alone who was 65 years of age or older. The average household size was 2.35, and the average family size was 3.00.

In the village, the population was spread out, with 25.5% under the age of 18, 6.8% from 18 to 24, 28.4% from 25 to 44, 19.0% from 45 to 64, and 20.2% who were 65 years of age or older. The median age was 37 years. For every 100 females, there were 90.9 males. For every 100 females age 18 and over, there were 85.3 males.

The median income for a household in the village was $37,908, and the median income for a family was $47,717. Males had a median income of $32,440 versus $25,194 for females. The per capita income for the village was $18,275. About 3.5% of families and 5.3% of the population were below the poverty line, including 5.1% of those under age 18 and 9.3% of those age 65 or over.

== Government ==
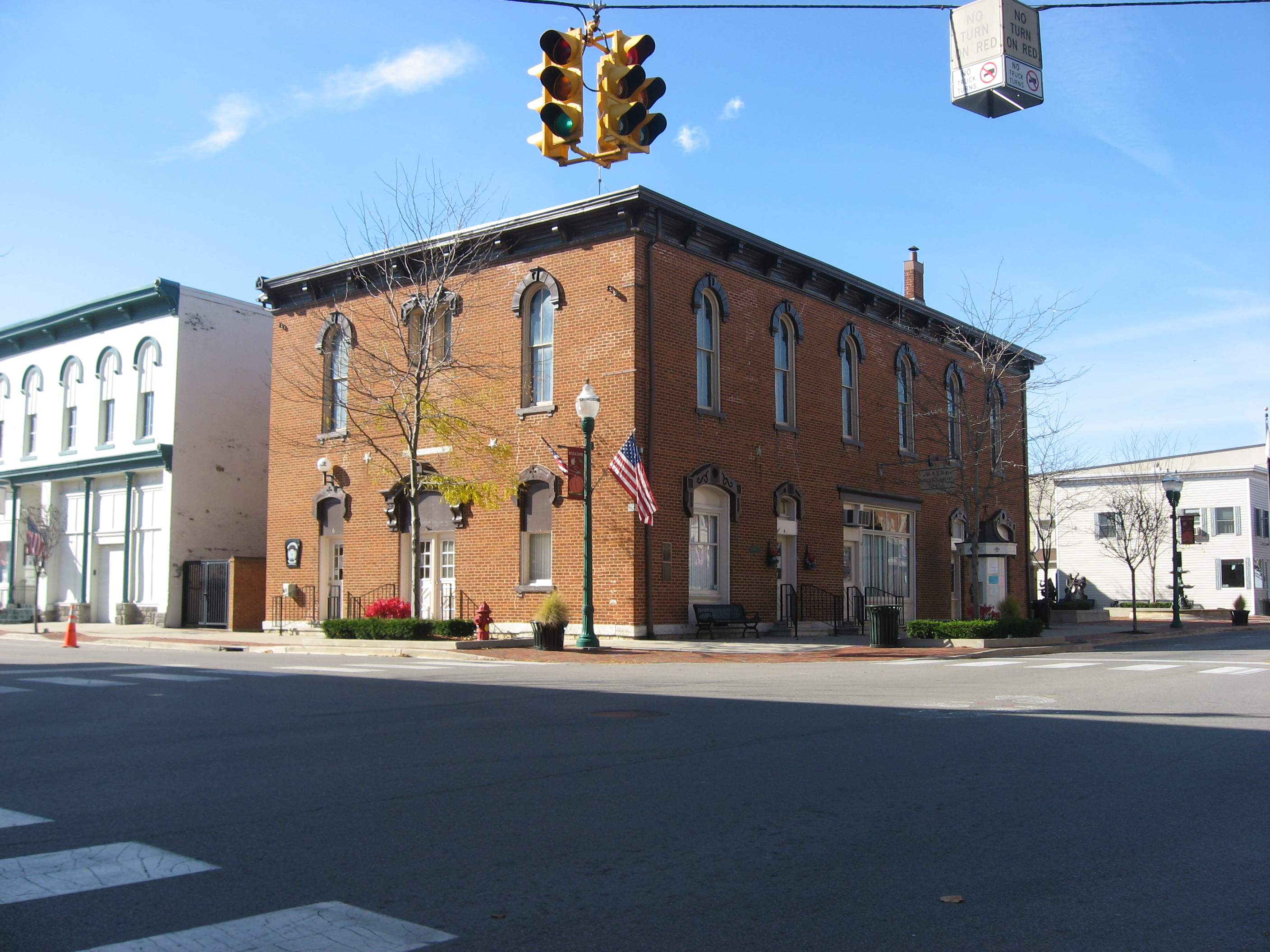
Versailles Town Hall and Wayne Township House

Versailles' municipal building, the Versailles Town Hall and Wayne Township House, is listed on the National Register of Historic Places.

Townspeople painting chickens on the streets of Versailles on Poultry Days 2009, with a previous year's palimpsest visible to the side.

== Poultry Days ==
Versailles is also known for hosting its yearly Poultry Days festival on the second full weekend of June. The festival consists of crowning a "Ms. Chick" and "Little Miss Chick," a carnival, a parade, the production of over 40,000 slow roasted chicken dinners, and the Poultry Days Ultimate tournament.

== Education ==
The Versailles Exempted Village School District operates one Elementary, Middle, and Jr./Sr. High School. The school building was finished in 2010 and resides at 280 Marker Road within the village limits. The school was paid for by the Versailles people in tax dollars.
