= Wayne Township, Darke County, Ohio =

Township in Ohio, US

- Township
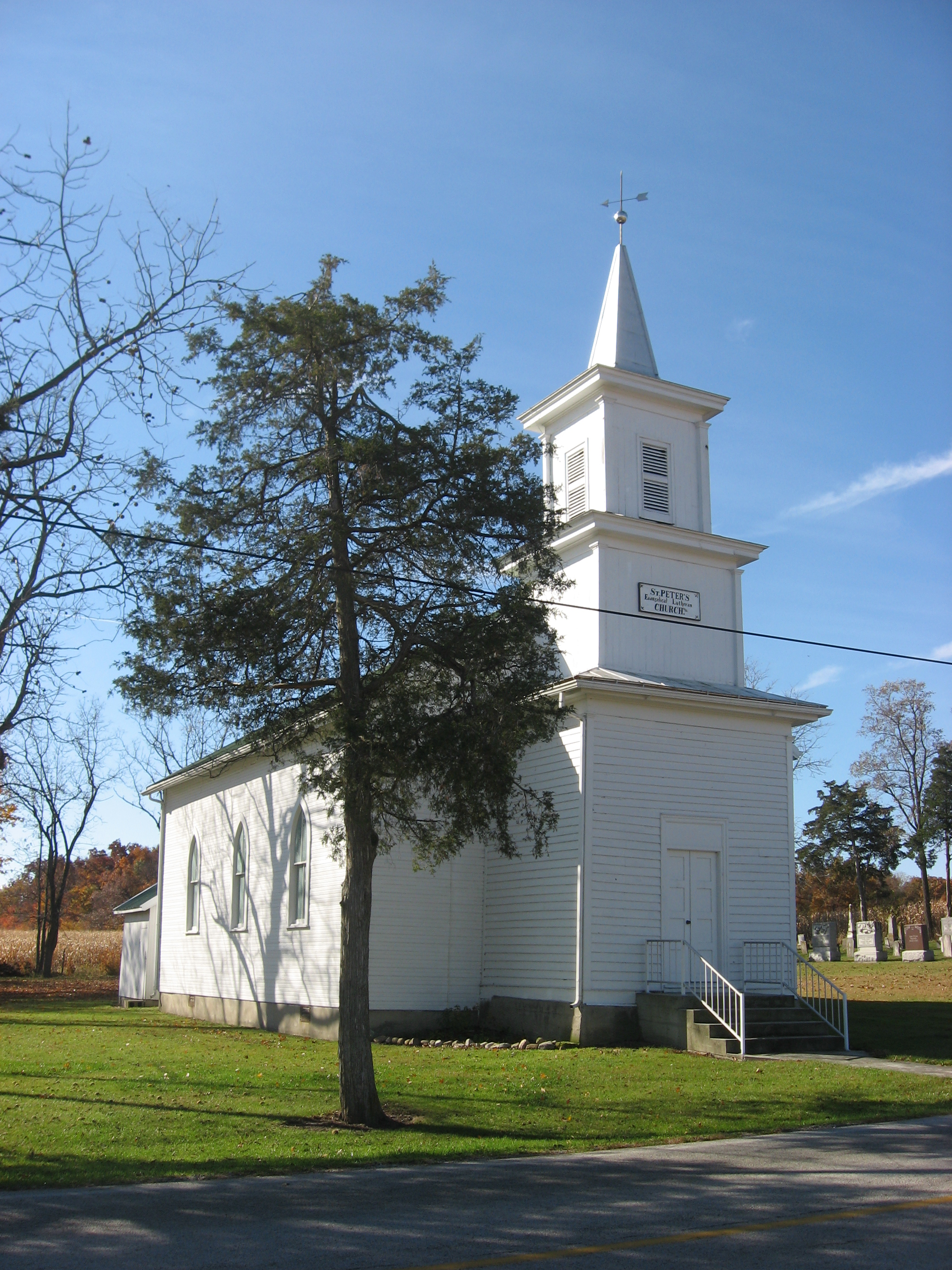
- St. Peter's Evangelical Lutheran Church, a landmark in the rural township

- Location in Darke County and the state of Ohio
- Coordinates: 40°13′17″N 84°29′2″W
- Country: United States
- State: Ohio
- County: Darke

Area
  - Total: 31.9 sq mi (82.7 km^{2})
  - Land: 31.8 sq mi (82.4 km^{2})
  - Water: 0.12 sq mi (0.3 km^{2})
- Elevation: 981 ft (299 m)

Population (2020)
  - Total: 4,491
  - Density: 141/sq mi (54.5/km^{2})
- Time zone: UTC-5 (Eastern (EST))
  - Summer (DST): UTC-4 (EDT)
- FIPS code: 39-82152
- GNIS feature ID: 1086027

Wayne Township is one of the twenty townships of Darke County, Ohio, United States. The 2020 census found 4,491 people in the township.

== Geography ==
Located in the northeastern part of the county, it borders the following townships:

- Patterson Township - north
- Cynthian Township, Shelby County - northeast corner
- Loramie Township, Shelby County - east
- Newberry Township, Miami County - southeast
- Adams Township - south
- Richland Township - southwest
- York Township - northwest

The village of Versailles is located in central Wayne Township, and the unincorporated community of Frenchtown lies in the township's northwest.

== Name and history ==
Wayne Township was established in 1817, and named for Anthony Wayne. It is one of twenty Wayne Townships statewide.

== Government ==
The township is governed by a three-member board of trustees, who are elected in November of odd-numbered years to a four-year term beginning on the following January 1. Two are elected in the year after the presidential election and one is elected in the year before it. There is also an elected township fiscal officer, who serves a four-year term beginning on April 1 of the year after the election, which is held in November of the year before the presidential election. Vacancies in the fiscal officership or on the board of trustees are filled by the remaining trustees.

The township's government is housed in Versailles, at the Versailles Town Hall and Wayne Township House, a structure on the National Register of Historic Places.
