= Franklin Township, Shelby County, Ohio =

Township in Ohio, US

- Township
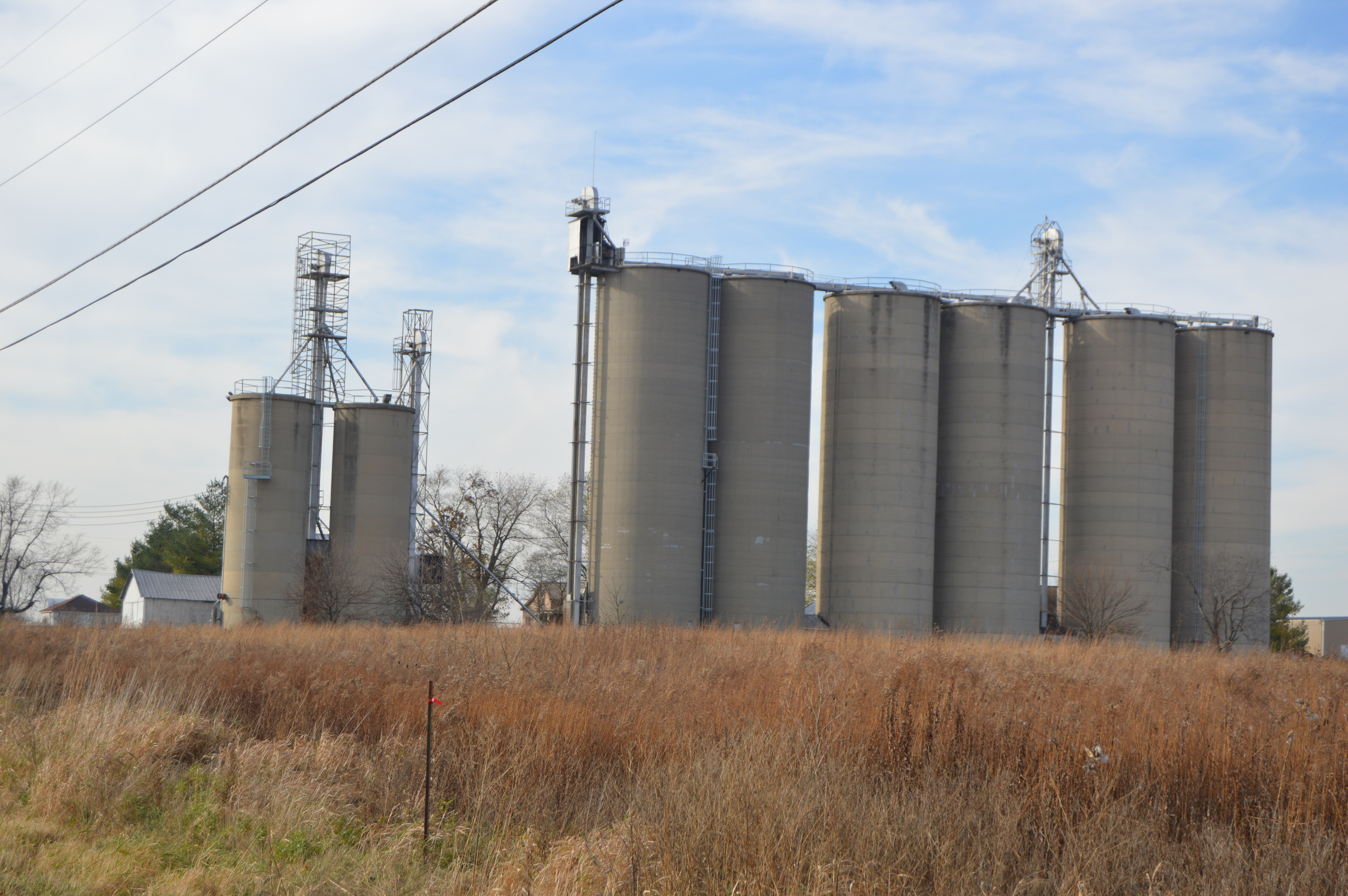
- Grain elevator at Swanders

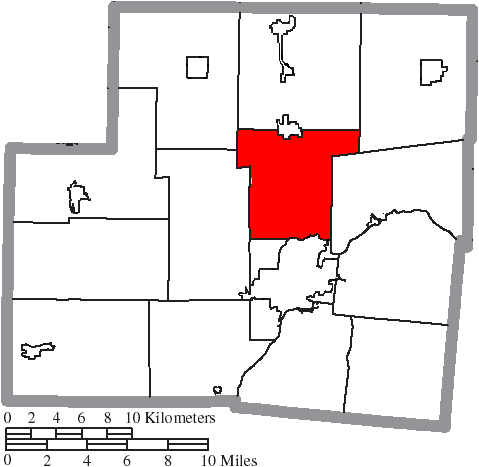
- Location of Franklin Township in Shelby County
- Coordinates: 40°21′39″N 84°9′45″W
- Country: United States
- State: Ohio
- County: Shelby

Area
  - Total: 24.8 sq mi (64.2 km^{2})
  - Land: 24.8 sq mi (64.2 km^{2})
  - Water: 0.039 sq mi (0.1 km^{2})
- Elevation: 1,007 ft (307 m)

Population (2020)
  - Total: 3,457
  - Density: 139/sq mi (53.8/km^{2})
- Time zone: UTC-5 (Eastern (EST))
  - Summer (DST): UTC-4 (EDT)
- FIPS code: 39-28434
- GNIS feature ID: 1086961

Franklin Township is one of the fourteen townships of Shelby County, Ohio, United States. The 2020 census found 3,457 people in the township.

== Geography ==
Located in the central part of the county, it borders the following townships:

- Dinsmore Township - north
- Jackson Township - northeast
- Salem Township - southeast
- Clinton Township - south
- Turtle Creek Township - southwest
- Van Buren Township - northwest

Two incorporated municipalities are located in Franklin Township: part of the village of Anna in the north, and part of the city of Sidney, the county seat of Shelby County, in the south. As well, the unincorporated community of Swanders lies in the township's center.

== Name and history ==
Franklin Township was established in 1835. It is one of twenty-one Franklin Townships statewide.

== Government ==
The township is governed by a three-member board of trustees, who are elected in November of odd-numbered years to a four-year term beginning on the following January 1. Two are elected in the year after the presidential election and one is elected in the year before it. There is also an elected township fiscal officer, who serves a four-year term beginning on April 1 of the year after the election, which is held in November of the year before the presidential election. Vacancies in the fiscal officership or on the board of trustees are filled by the remaining trustees.
