= Washington Township, Shelby County, Ohio =

Township in Ohio, US

- Township
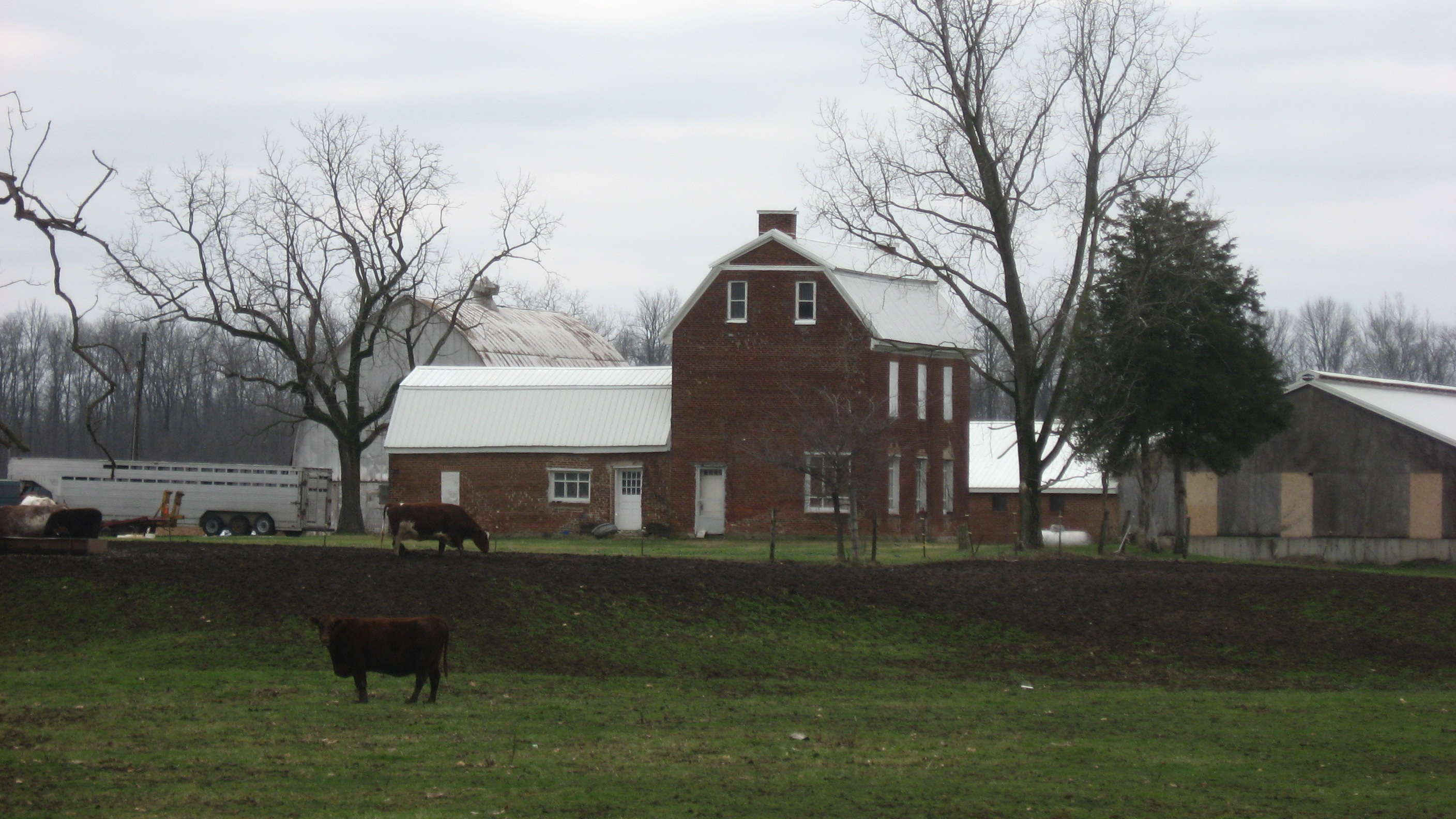
- Wilson-Lenox House, built 1816

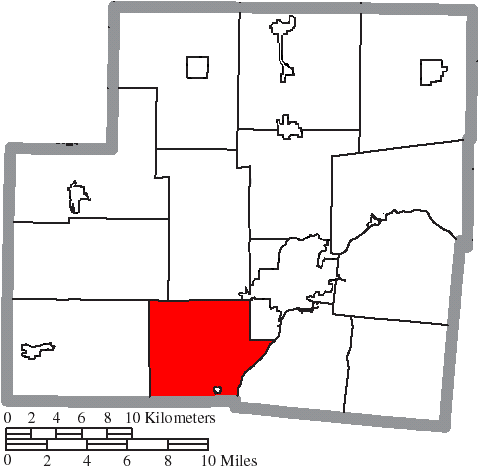
- Location of Washington Township in Shelby County
- Coordinates: 40°13′44″N 84°14′18″W
- Country: United States
- State: Ohio
- County: Shelby

Area
  - Total: 25.2 sq mi (65.2 km^{2})
  - Land: 25.0 sq mi (64.8 km^{2})
  - Water: 0.15 sq mi (0.4 km^{2})
- Elevation: 928 ft (283 m)

Population (2020)
  - Total: 1,899
  - Density: 76/sq mi (29.3/km^{2})
- Time zone: UTC-5 (Eastern (EST))
  - Summer (DST): UTC-4 (EDT)
- FIPS code: 39-81620
- GNIS feature ID: 1086971

Washington Township is one of the fourteen townships of Shelby County, Ohio, United States. The 2020 census found 1,899 people in the township.

== Geography ==
Located in the southern part of the county, it borders the following townships:

- Turtle Creek Township - north
- Clinton Township - northeast
- Orange Township - east
- Washington Township, Miami County - south
- Loramie Township - west
- Cynthian Township - northwest

The village of Lockington is located in southeastern Washington Township.

== Name and history ==
Washington Township was established in 1825. It is one of forty-three Washington Townships statewide.

== Government ==
The township is governed by a three-member board of trustees, who are elected in November of odd-numbered years to a four-year term beginning on the following January 1. Two are elected in the year after the presidential election and one is elected in the year before it. There is also an elected township fiscal officer, who serves a four-year term beginning on April 1 of the year after the election, which is held in November of the year before the presidential election. Vacancies in the fiscal officership or on the board of trustees are filled by the remaining trustees.
