= Dinsmore Township, Ohio =

Township in Ohio, US

- Township
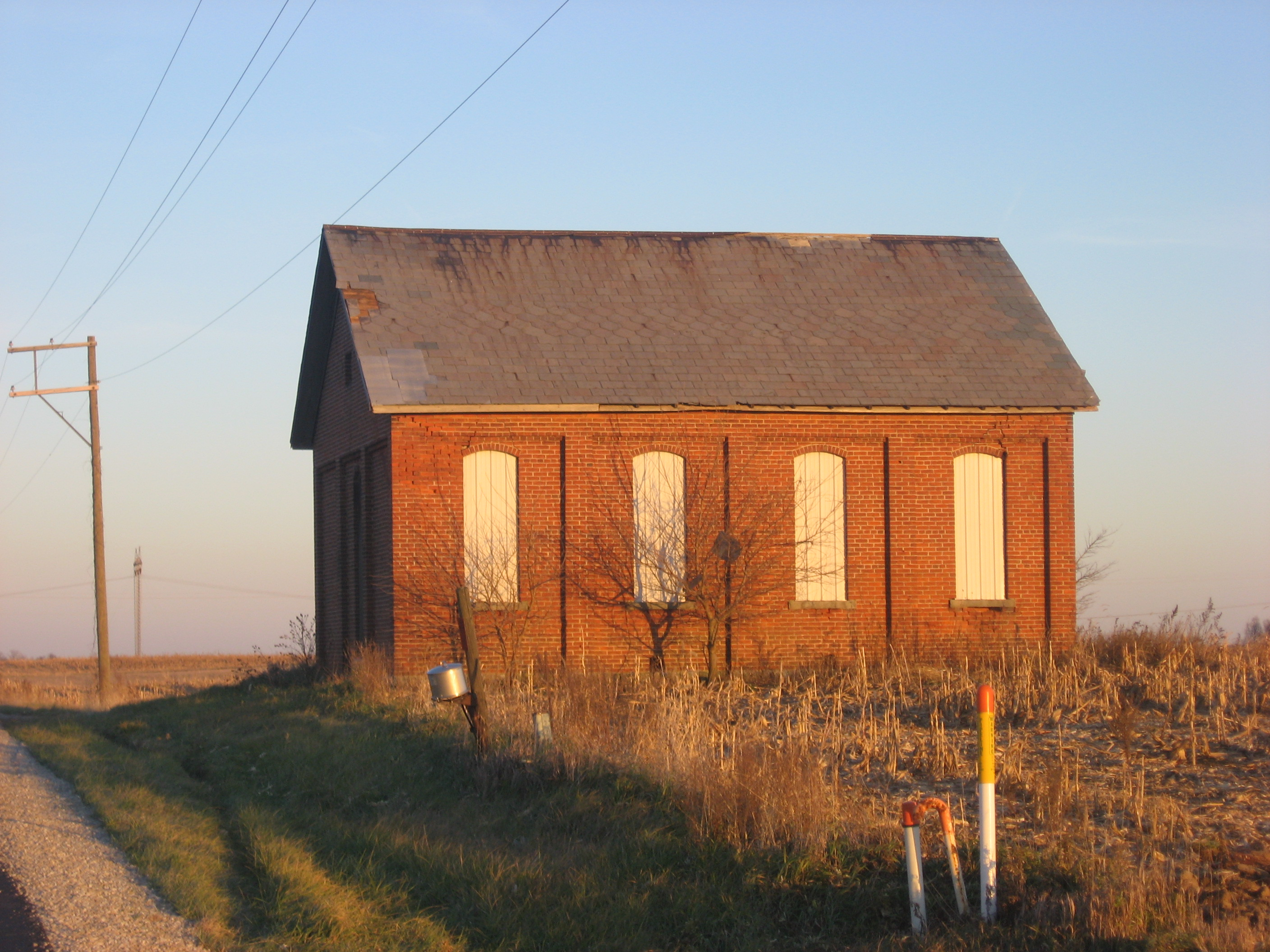
- Abandoned school on State Route 274

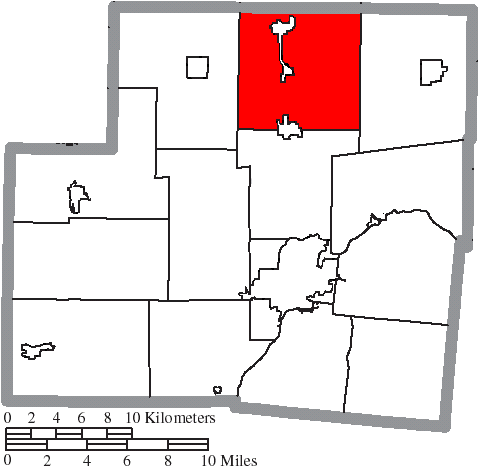
- Location of Dinsmore Township in Shelby County
- Coordinates: 40°26′22″N 84°10′20″W
- Country: United States
- State: Ohio
- County: Shelby

Area
  - Total: 36.3 sq mi (94.1 km^{2})
  - Land: 36.3 sq mi (94.1 km^{2})
  - Water: 0 sq mi (0.0 km^{2})
- Elevation: 1,001 ft (305 m)

Population (2020)
  - Total: 3,379
  - Density: 93.0/sq mi (35.9/km^{2})
- Time zone: UTC-5 (Eastern (EST))
  - Summer (DST): UTC-4 (EDT)
- FIPS code: 39-22050
- GNIS feature ID: 1086960

Dinsmore Township is one of the fourteen townships of Shelby County, Ohio, United States. The 2020 census found 3,379 people in the township.

== Geography ==
Located in the northern part of the county, it borders the following townships:

- Pusheta Township, Auglaize County - north
- Clay Township, Auglaize County - northeast corner
- Jackson Township - east
- Franklin Township - south
- Van Buren Township - west
- Washington Township, Auglaize County - northwest corner

Two villages are located in Dinsmore Township: part of Anna in the south, and Botkins in the north and center.

== Name and history ==
Dinsmore Township was established in 1832. It is the only Dinsmore Township statewide.

== Government ==
The township is governed by a three-member board of trustees, who are elected in November of odd-numbered years to a four-year term beginning on the following January 1. Two are elected in the year after the presidential election and one is elected in the year before it. There is also an elected township fiscal officer, who serves a four-year term beginning on April 1 of the year after the election, which is held in November of the year before the presidential election. Vacancies in the fiscal officership or on the board of trustees are filled by the remaining trustees.
