= Houston High School (Ohio) =

Location
- 5300 Houston Rd. Houston, Ohio 45333; United States

Information
- School district: Hardin-Houston Local Schools
- Staff: 21.00 (FTE)
- Grades: 7–12
- Enrollment: 340 (2023-2024)
- Student to teacher ratio: 16.19
- Language: English
- Colors: Red & White
- Athletics conference: Shelby County Athletic League
- Team name: Wildcats
- Website: http://www.hardinhouston.org/

Houston High School (/ˈhaʊstən/ HOW-stən) is a public high school in Houston, Ohio. It is the only high school in the Hardin-Houston Local School district. The Wildcats wear red and white.

In 2008, Houston High School won their 3rd straight Division 4 District Championship in basketball. In 2010, they won their eighth straight softball championship in the Shelby County Athletic League.
