= Kirkwood, Ohio =

Unincorporated community in Ohio, U.S.

Coordinates: 40°12′58″N 84°11′50″W

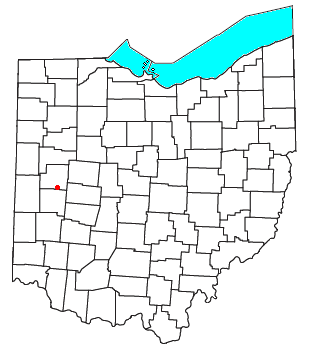
Location of Kirkwood, Ohio

Kirkwood is a rural unincorporated community located at the intersection of Kirkwood and River Roads in southwestern Orange Township, Shelby County, Ohio, United States.

Originally named Pontiac before the name change, Kirkwood is located halfway between Sidney to the north and Piqua to the south in neighboring Miami County. The original Dayton and Michigan Railroad, later B&O, Chessie System, and now CSX Transportation runs through Kirkwood. The rural community is visible from Interstate 75 as an overpass over Kirkwood Road, although no exit for Kirkwood exits.

Kirkwood was originally called Pontiac, and under the latter name was platted in 1868. A post office called Kirkwood was established in 1866, and remained in operation until 1913. The present name honors D. Kirkwood Gillespie, the proprietor of a local grain elevator.
