= Cynthian Township, Ohio =

Township in Ohio, US

Cynthian Township, Shelby County, Ohio
- Township
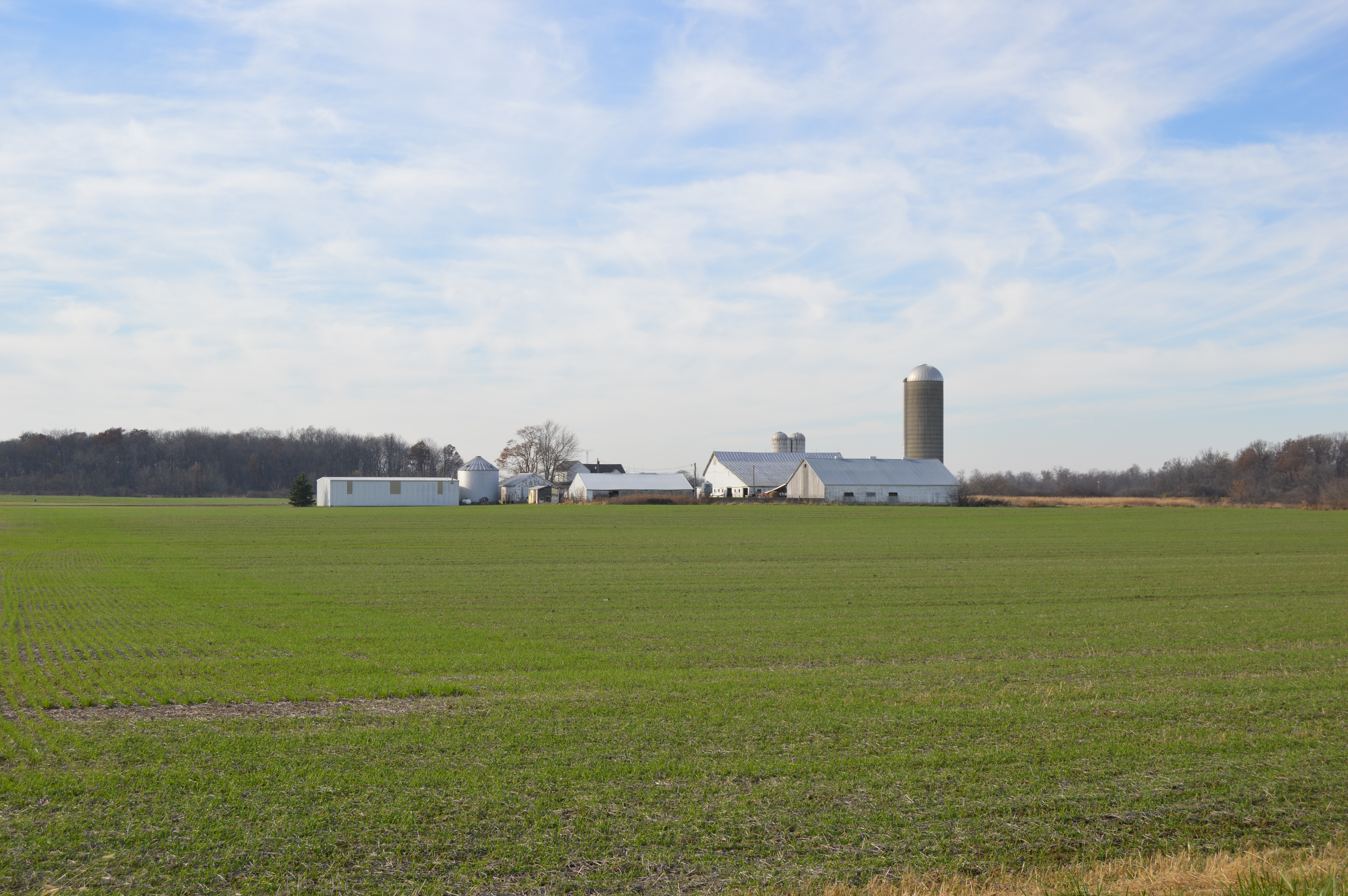
- Fields northwest of Newport

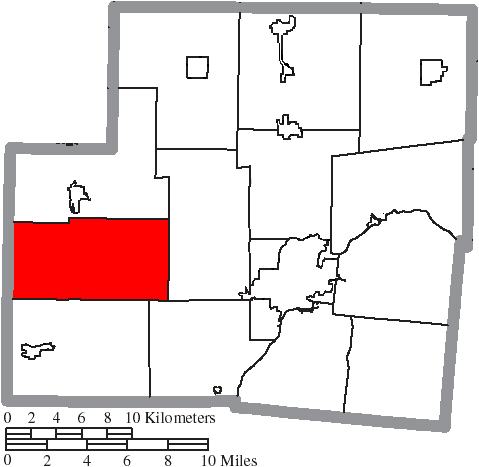
- Location of Cynthian Township in Shelby County
- Coordinates: 40°17′53″N 84°21′56″W
- Country: United States
- State: Ohio
- County: Shelby

Area
  - Total: 31.4 sq mi (81.2 km^{2})
  - Land: 31.3 sq mi (81.0 km^{2})
  - Water: 0.077 sq mi (0.2 km^{2})
- Elevation: 1,014 ft (309 m)

Population (2020)
  - Total: 2,000
  - Density: 64/sq mi (24.7/km^{2})
- Time zone: UTC-5 (Eastern (EST))
  - Summer (DST): UTC-4 (EDT)
- FIPS code: 39-19834
- GNIS feature ID: 1086959

Cynthian Township is one of the fourteen townships of Shelby County, Ohio, United States. The 2020 census found 2,000 people in the township.

== Geography ==
Located in the western part of the county, it borders the following townships:

- McLean Township – north
- Turtle Creek Township – east
- Washington Township – southeast
- Loramie Township – south
- Wayne Township, Darke County – southwest
- Patterson Township, Darke County – west

No municipalities are located in Cynthian Township, although the census-designated place of Newport is located in the center of the township.

== Name and history ==
Cynthian Township was organized in 1825. It is the only Cynthian Township statewide.

== Government ==
The township is governed by a three-member board of trustees, who are elected in November of odd-numbered years to a four-year term beginning on the following January 1. Two are elected in the year after the presidential election and one is elected in the year before it. There is also an elected township fiscal officer, who serves a four-year term beginning on April 1 of the year after the election, which is held in November of the year before the presidential election. Vacancies in the fiscal officership or on the board of trustees are filled by the remaining trustees.
