= Turtle Creek Township, Shelby County, Ohio =

Township in Ohio, US

- Township
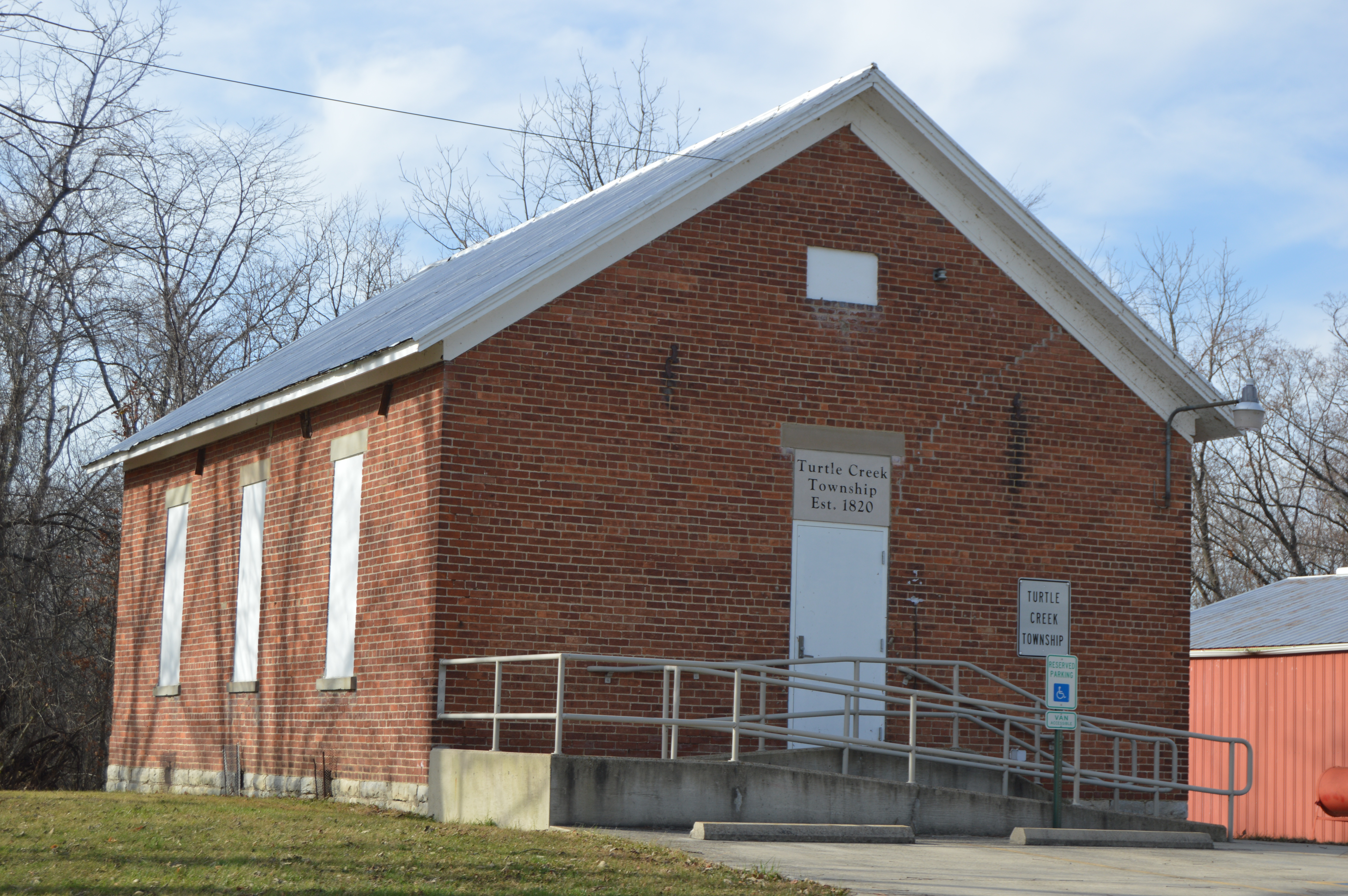
- Township hall north of Hardin

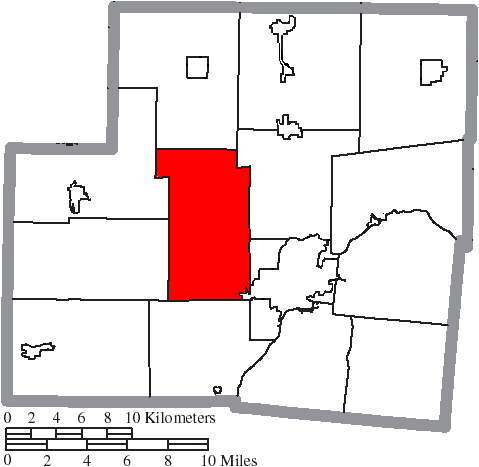
- Location of Turtle Creek Township in Shelby County
- Coordinates: 40°19′2″N 84°14′53″W
- Country: United States
- State: Ohio
- County: Shelby

Area
  - Total: 30.3 sq mi (78.4 km^{2})
  - Land: 30.3 sq mi (78.4 km^{2})
  - Water: 0 sq mi (0.0 km^{2})
- Elevation: 1,004 ft (306 m)

Population (2020)
  - Total: 1,605
  - Density: 53.0/sq mi (20.5/km^{2})
- Time zone: UTC-5 (Eastern (EST))
  - Summer (DST): UTC-4 (EDT)
- FIPS code: 39-77854
- GNIS feature ID: 1086969

Turtle Creek Township is one of the fourteen townships of Shelby County, Ohio, United States. The 2020 census found 1,605 people in the township.

== Geography ==
Located in the central part of the county, it borders the following townships:

- Van Buren Township - north
- Franklin Township - northeast
- Clinton Township - southeast
- Washington Township - south
- Cynthian Township - southwest
- McLean Township - northwest

A small portion of the city of Sidney, the county seat of Shelby County, is located in southeastern Turtle Creek Township. The unincorporated communities of Hardin, St. Patrick, and Uno are located in the township's northwest.

== Name and history ==
Turtle Creek Township was organized in 1825, and named after Turtle Creek. It is the only Turtle Creek Township statewide, although there is a Turtlecreek Township in Warren County.

The first village in Shelby County Ohio was Hardin (named after Colonel John Hardin), which was platted October 5, 1816; after the county was organized in 1819, it became the seat of justice and the first Court of Common Pleas, and session of the County Commissioners was held there. In 1820 the county seat was established at Sidney. The Cleveland, Columbus, Cincinnati, and Indianapolis Railroad established a railroad crossing called "Hardin Station" one mile south of the village.

== Government ==
The township is governed by a three-member board of trustees, who are elected in November of odd-numbered years to a four-year term beginning on the following January 1. Two are elected in the year after the presidential election and one is elected in the year before it. There is also an elected township fiscal officer, who serves a four-year term beginning on April 1 of the year after the election, which is held in November of the year before the presidential election. Vacancies in the fiscal officership or on the board of trustees are filled by the remaining trustees.
