= Newport, Shelby County, Ohio =

- CDP
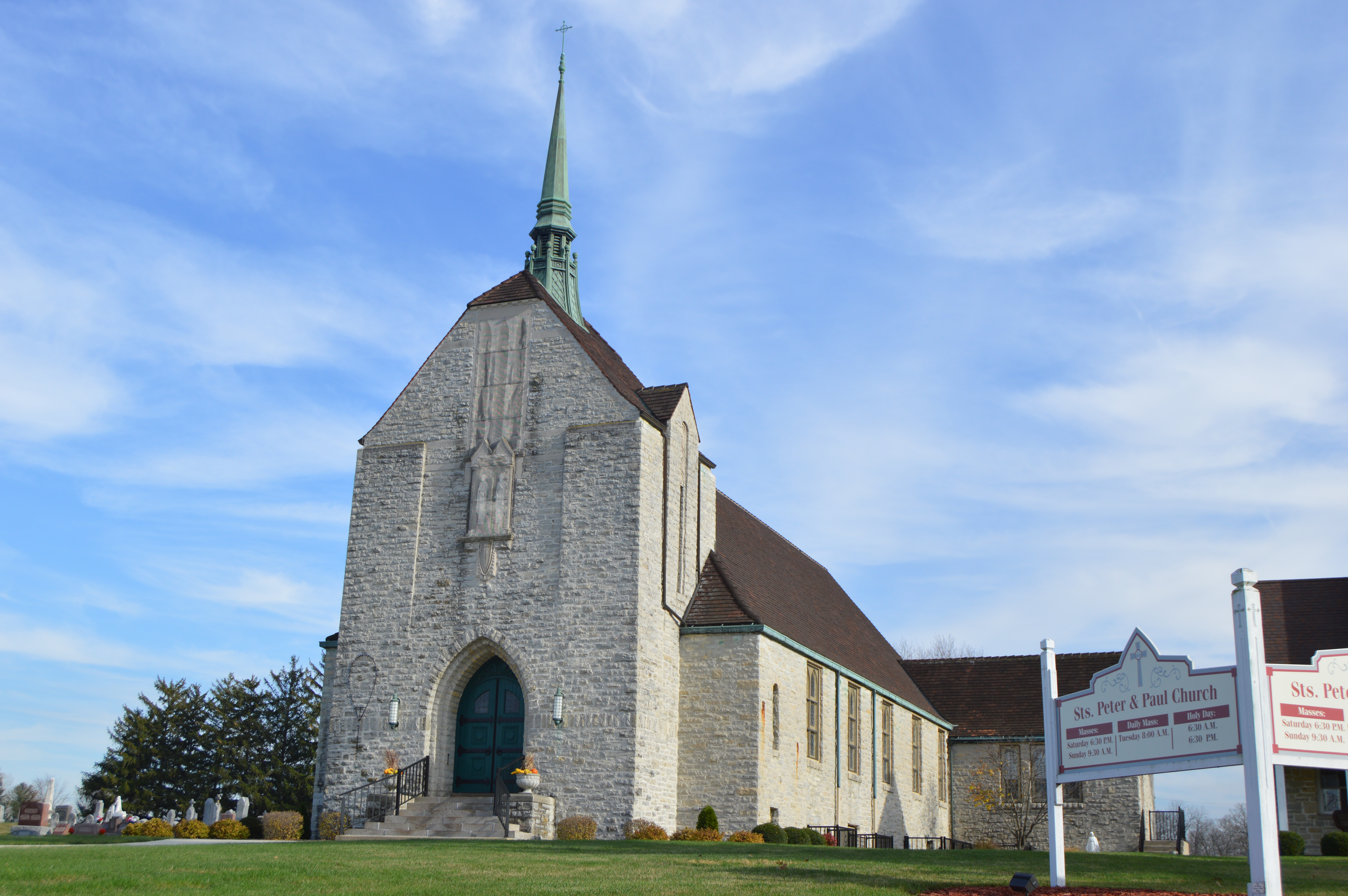
- SS Peter and Paul Church
- Coordinates: 40°17′47″N 84°22′20″W
- Country: United States
- State: Ohio
- County: Shelby
- Township: Cynthian
- Elevation: 958 ft (292 m)

Population (2020)
  - Total: 169
- Time zone: UTC-5 (Eastern (EST))
  - Summer (DST): UTC-4 (EDT)
- GNIS feature ID: 2628945

Newport is a census-designated place (CDP) in Cynthian Township, Shelby County, Ohio, United States. The community is located along the former Miami and Erie Canal and at the intersection of State Routes 47 and 66. The population was 169 at the 2020 census.

== History ==
Newport was platted in 1839.
