= Poultry Days =

Coordinates: 40°13′04″N 84°29′00″W

- Status: active
- Genre: food festivals
- Frequency: Annually
- Location: Versailles, Ohio
- Country: United States
- Years active: 74–75
- Inaugurated: 1951
- Website: www.versaillespoultrydays.com

Poultry Days is a festival in Versailles, Ohio that celebrates the heritage of the poultry producing industry of Versailles, which dates back to the early 1900s. At one time Versailles called itself "Poultry Capital of the World". The festival began officially in 1951 (and possibly earlier) as a one-day community picnic, and has evolved into a three-day festival.

The Village of Versailles holds the festival annually at Versailles High School where a giant "Beer Tent" is erected on one of the main arteries into the village. Rides, parades and contests are held, including the "Miss Chick" contest for high school age young ladies and a "Little Miss Poultry Days" contest for girls ages 4–6. More than 25,000 "World Famous Poultry Days Barbecue Chicken Dinners" are served. The 1967 festival was noted for the creation of a gigantic omelette cooked with 90 dozen eggs.

The 3-day festival also includes one of the world's largest Ultimate tournaments, the Jeff Warrick Poultry Days Ultimate Classic. Dale Wilker and his friends started the tournament with just two teams, in honor of and it has now grown to include dozens of teams from the United States and internationally.

In 1983 George Wendt ("Norm Peterson" from Cheers) came to Versailles to act as the Honorary Festival Leader. He came to thank Don Wick, a Versailles High School counselor who successfully created a campaign to save Cheers from being canceled after its first season. After his duties as Festival Leader were over, Wendt went around to the local bars and drank with the patrons.

== History ==
Poultry Days Festival began as a single day event held on a Thursday and referred to as Poultry Day. This first festival was small and community focused but grew quickly drawing visitors from surrounding communities and from as far as Dayton. In 1962, the Day was expanded to a two-day event on Wednesday and Thursday. In 1966, the festival was moved again making it a weekend event held on Friday and Saturday. In 1969, expansion included the now ever-present carnival rides. Finally, in 1972, the annual Poultry Days Festival was expanded to a three-day event on held on Friday, Saturday and Sunday. Poultry Days has settled into being held on the second full weekend in June.

The selection of foods available at the festival has evolved, and throughout the years choices included an egg smorgasbord, turkey and noodles, turkey burgers, and deviled eggs. In 1974, barbequed chicken was finally served throughout the entire festival. The first dinners cost $1.25 and included half a chicken, a roll, butter, chips, cranberry salad, pickles and a choice of coffee or pop.

In 1952 it took approximately 125 volunteers to construct and operate the BBQ pits. By 1970, chicken dinners had outgrown the capacity of local volunteers so a partnership began with Nelson's BBQ (formerly known as Port-A-Pit). This partnership continues with the third generation of the Nelson family providing chicken for Poultry Days, which remains their single largest annual event.

The early chicken serving lines were run by “The Ladies Serving Committee,” while the men ran the barbecue pits. A drive-through line was added in 2001. Further enhancements have culminated in a smooth running operation, which in 2014 averaged 1,300 dinners served per hour, with a peak of nearly 2,000 dinners per hour, or a dinner every 2 seconds.

The first “Miss Chick,” Bonnie Sue Besecker (Laura, Ohio), was crowned in 1952 and the festival has continued to recognize vibrant, dynamic, young women. The pageant has drawn as many as 112 contestants from throughout Ohio and beyond, requiring an extensive judging process that begins before the festival. Today the event is limited to young ladies from Darke and surrounding counties. A new tradition was born in 1985 when Trisha Rhoades became the festival's first “Little Miss Poultry Days”.

As early as 1957 or 1958, Colonel Warner Nichols added the Grand Parade which he organized until his death in 1965 at which time John “Red” Elson took over. Red went on to start the successful Antique Car parade in 1973 which is now run by the Dickman Family. In the late 1960s the Versailles Fire Department took over organizing the Grand Parade which has continued for nearly 50 years. Both parades continue today and draw in excess of 100 units annually making them among the largest parades in the region. The honorary Grand Parade Marshall position has been awarded to community leaders who are recognized for their contribution and volunteerism in the community.

In the early 1970s, Poultry Days attempted to break the world record for the largest egg omelet with another attempt in 1982. This culminated in an omelet that measured nearly 9 feet in diameter and required 22,128 eggs, 100 pounds of onions, and 100 pounds of ham that were combined in a concrete mixer. The custom-built omelet pan was an exhibit for many years.

The Ultimate Frisbee Tournament started in 1981.

The Giant Chicken float first made its appearance in the late 80s and was originally purchased by the Versailles Development Association to promote Versailles. Annual chicken painting (on the streets in intersections) started in 1996 to welcome visitors to town and later to designate board members and festival VIPs. The creation of a festival theme began in 1987.

In 1974, the Beer Tent was established as the area's first official social tent serving beer on a closed State Highway. Over the years, festival entertainment has ranged from orchestras to modern bands.

In 1983, a group of Versailles friends organized the first Poultry Days Ultimate Frisbee Championship after the hometown team the Blue Meanies beat the Diamond Dawgs of Dayton in a grudge match the previous year. The annual tournament has grown to become a top tournament and one of three “bucket list” tournaments drawing several thousand players and friends to Versailles each year. Players from around the United States and international teams have made the pilgrimage to Versailles and have experienced a warm welcome from residents and businesses. The event was originally named the Poultry Days Ultimate Tournament but in 1990 it was changed to the Jeff Warrick Poultry Days Ultimate Class after Jeff Warrick and then Dan Goubeaux who succumbed to Leukemia. From this point forward the money raised from the tournament has been donated to the Leukemia and Lymphoma Society of America. This event has developed its own traditions including an egg eating contest for charity and strong connections to the Miss Chick Pageant. The ultimate players vie for Miss Chick to choose them as “Mr. Cluck.”

On July 4, 1985, Poultry Days dedicated Heritage Park. Originally intended to be a new location for the festival, the project evolved into a 40-acre park including ponds, a walking track, shelter houses and sports fields. The park is also home to several thousand Ultimate players each summer. While Poultry Days continues to fund the park, the independent Heritage Park Board was established to oversee and maintain the park. Poultry Days has donated in excess of $700,000 over the past 10 years.

Though Versailles has only 2,687 residents, Poultry Days attracts crowds exceeding 50,000 people over the course of the festival weekend. With a record of 26,101 dinners in 2002, the festival is quickly approaching its one millionth dinner sold.

Due to the COVID-19 pandemic, the 2020 in-person festival was canceled but chicken dinners were still available for drive-thru pickup.
