= Clinton Township, Ohio =

Clinton Township, Ohio, may refer to:

- Clinton Township, Franklin County, Ohio
- Clinton Township, Fulton County, Ohio
- Clinton Township, Knox County, Ohio
- Clinton Township, Seneca County, Ohio
- Clinton Township, Shelby County, Ohio
- Clinton Township, Vinton County, Ohio
- Clinton Township, Wayne County, Ohio
