= Swanders, Ohio =

Unincorporated community in Ohio, U.S.

Coordinates: 40°21′38″N 84°10′23″W

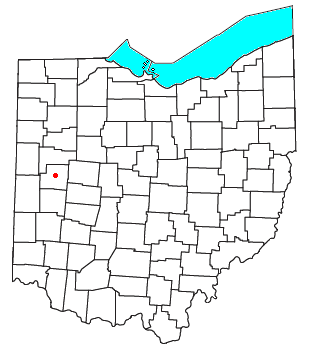
Location of Swanders, Ohio

Swanders is a rural unincorporated community located on Fort Loramie-Swanders Road in Franklin Township, Shelby County, Ohio, United States. It lies midway between the village of Anna and the city of Sidney.

== History ==
In 1857 the Dayton and Michigan Railroad was constructed through James Swander's farm who gave the railroad the right of way through his farm; in 1867 a flag station of the D & M. R. R. and a Post Office was established in the village on the application of James Swander. The village was named in honor of James Swanders who was the town first postmaster and who also served as a railroad agent for the D & M R R.

One of the 1965 Palm Sunday tornados narrowly missed the community.

For many years, Swanders was the location of a community-owned grain elevator, which has since been demolished with the silos and office remaining of the ag business which was purchased in the 1990s by Wapakoneta-based Auglaize-Provico. In 2010 Auglaize-Provico merged in with Trupointe Coopererative based in Piqua which also purchased the former Landmark grain terminal in nearby Sidney. As of 2020, the Sidney grain terminal is now owned by Cargill Inc.

In 2016, Fremont-based Sunrise Cooperative purchased Trupointe Cooperative with its Sidney Grain facility and neighboring Advanced Agri Solutions, a feed business both located in Swanders.

In 2018 after 161 years, Sunrise Cooperative closed down its Swanders operation.

== Government ==
The Franklin Township hall is located in Swanders.

== Transportation ==
A north-south CSX rail line passes through Swanders.

Because of its location near County Road 25-A (the former U.S. 25), Swanders can easily be accessed by road from the nearby Interstate 75 which runs parallel with 25-A. (Exit 94).
