= Loramie Township, Shelby County, Ohio =

Township in Ohio, US

- Township
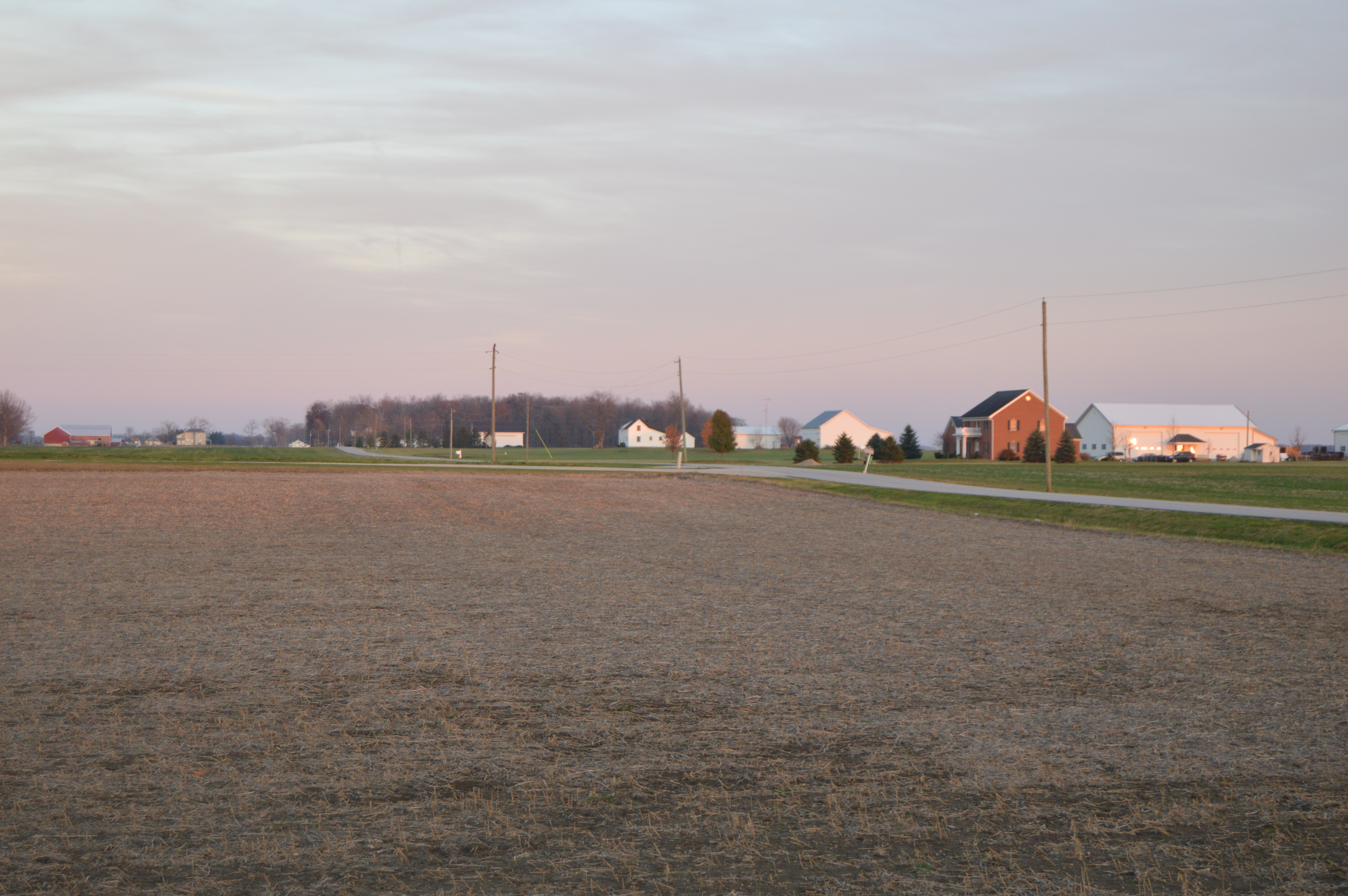
- Fields south of Russia

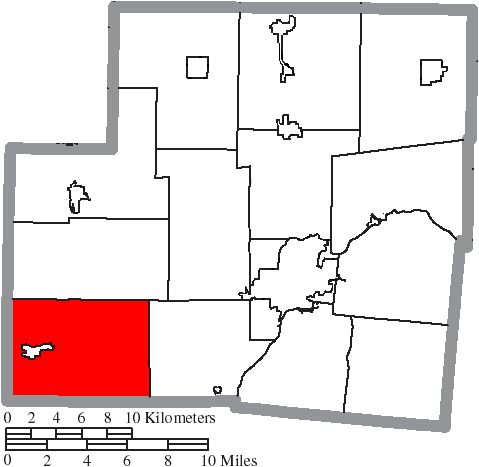
- Location of Loramie Township in Shelby County
- Coordinates: 40°14′24″N 84°22′6″W
- Country: United States
- State: Ohio
- County: Shelby

Area
  - Total: 35.6 sq mi (92.1 km^{2})
  - Land: 35.5 sq mi (92.0 km^{2})
  - Water: 0.039 sq mi (0.1 km^{2})
- Elevation: 968 ft (295 m)

Population (2020)
  - Total: 2,650
  - Density: 75/sq mi (28.8/km^{2})
- Time zone: UTC-5 (Eastern (EST))
  - Summer (DST): UTC-4 (EDT)
- FIPS code: 39-44884
- GNIS feature ID: 1086964

Loramie Township is one of the fourteen townships of Shelby County, Ohio, United States. The 2020 census found 2,650 people in the township.

== Geography ==
Located in the southwestern corner of the county, it borders the following townships:

- Cynthian Township – north
- Washington Township – east
- Washington Township, Miami County – southeast
- Newberry Township, Miami County – south
- Wayne Township, Darke County – west
- Patterson Township, Darke County – northwest corner

The village of Russia is located in western Loramie Township, and the unincorporated communities of Houston and Mount Jefferson lie in the northern and northeastern parts of the township.

== Name and history ==
Loramie Township was established in 1825, and named after a pioneer merchant. It is the only Loramie Township statewide.

== Government ==
The township is governed by a three-member board of trustees, who are elected in November of odd-numbered years to a four-year term beginning on the following January 1. Two are elected in the year after the presidential election and one is elected in the year before it. There is also an elected township fiscal officer, who serves a four-year term beginning on April 1 of the year after the election, which is held in November of the year before the presidential election. Vacancies in the fiscal officership or on the board of trustees are filled by the remaining trustees.
