= Patterson Township, Darke County, Ohio =

Township in Ohio, US

- Township
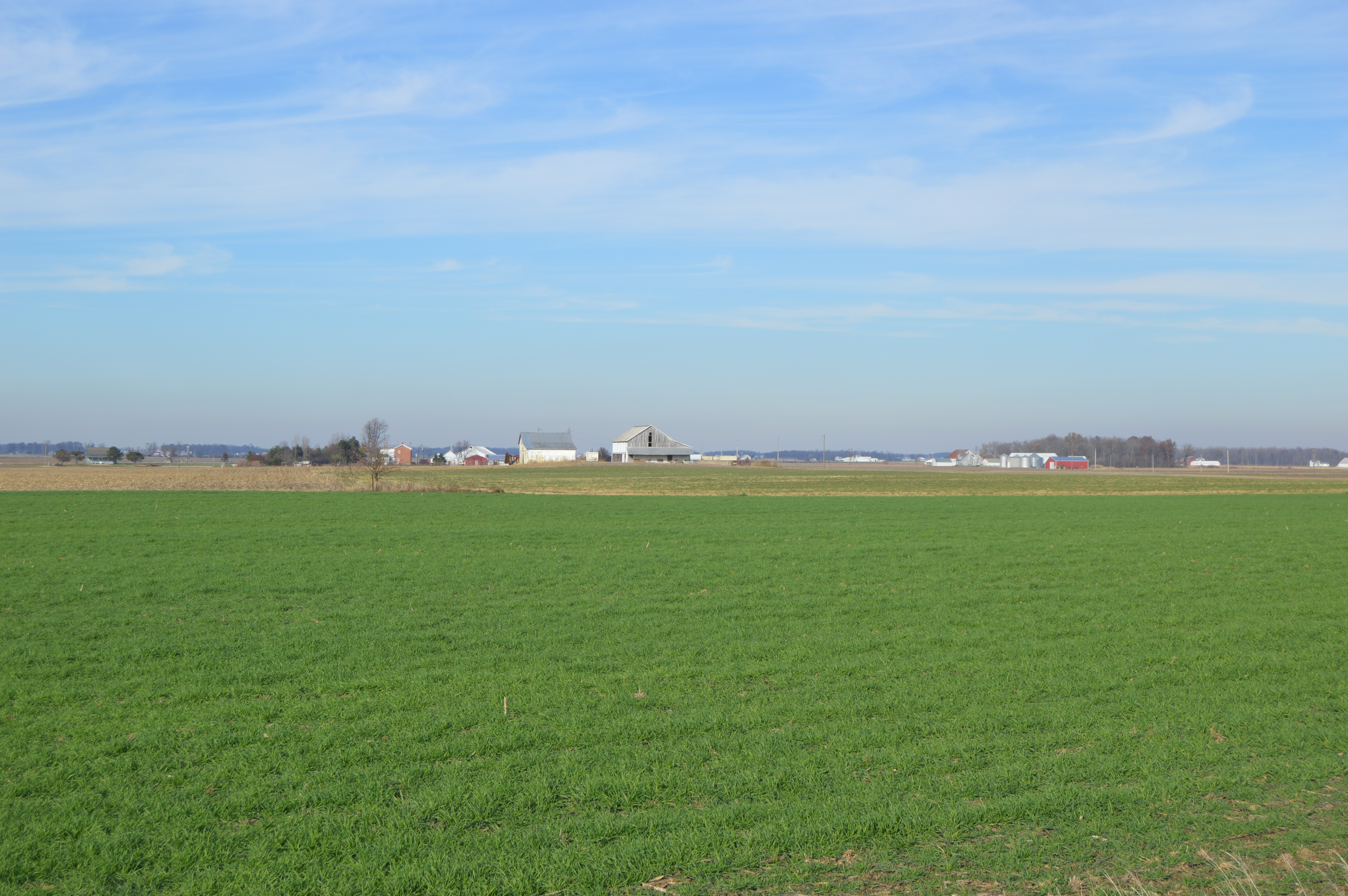
- Fields east of Yorkshire

- Location in Darke County and the state of Ohio.
- Coordinates: 40°19′4″N 84°28′42″W
- Country: United States
- State: Ohio
- County: Darke

Area
  - Total: 26.9 sq mi (69.8 km^{2})
  - Land: 26.9 sq mi (69.7 km^{2})
  - Water: 0.039 sq mi (0.1 km^{2})
- Elevation: 978 ft (298 m)

Population (2020)
  - Total: 1,452
  - Density: 54.0/sq mi (20.8/km^{2})
- Time zone: UTC-5 (Eastern (EST))
  - Summer (DST): UTC-4 (EDT)
- FIPS code: 39-61168
- GNIS feature ID: 1086021

Patterson Township is one of the twenty townships of Darke County, Ohio, United States. The 2020 census found 1,452 people in the township.

== Geography ==
Located in the northeastern corner of the county, it borders the following townships:

- Marion Township, Mercer County - north
- McLean Township, Shelby County - northeast
- Cynthian Township, Shelby County - east
- Loramie Township, Shelby County - southeast corner
- Wayne Township - south
- York Township - southwest
- Wabash Township - west

Two incorporated villages are located in Patterson Township: Osgood in the northwest, and Yorkshire in the west.

== Name and history ==
It is the only Patterson Township statewide.

Patterson Township was established in 1841.

== Government ==
The township is governed by a three-member board of trustees, who are elected in November of odd-numbered years to a four-year term beginning on the following January 1. Two are elected in the year after the presidential election and one is elected in the year before it. There is also an elected township fiscal officer, who serves a four-year term beginning on April 1 of the year after the election, which is held in November of the year before the presidential election. Vacancies in the fiscal officership or on the board of trustees are filled by the remaining trustees.
