= McLean Township, Shelby County, Ohio =

Township in Ohio, US

- Township
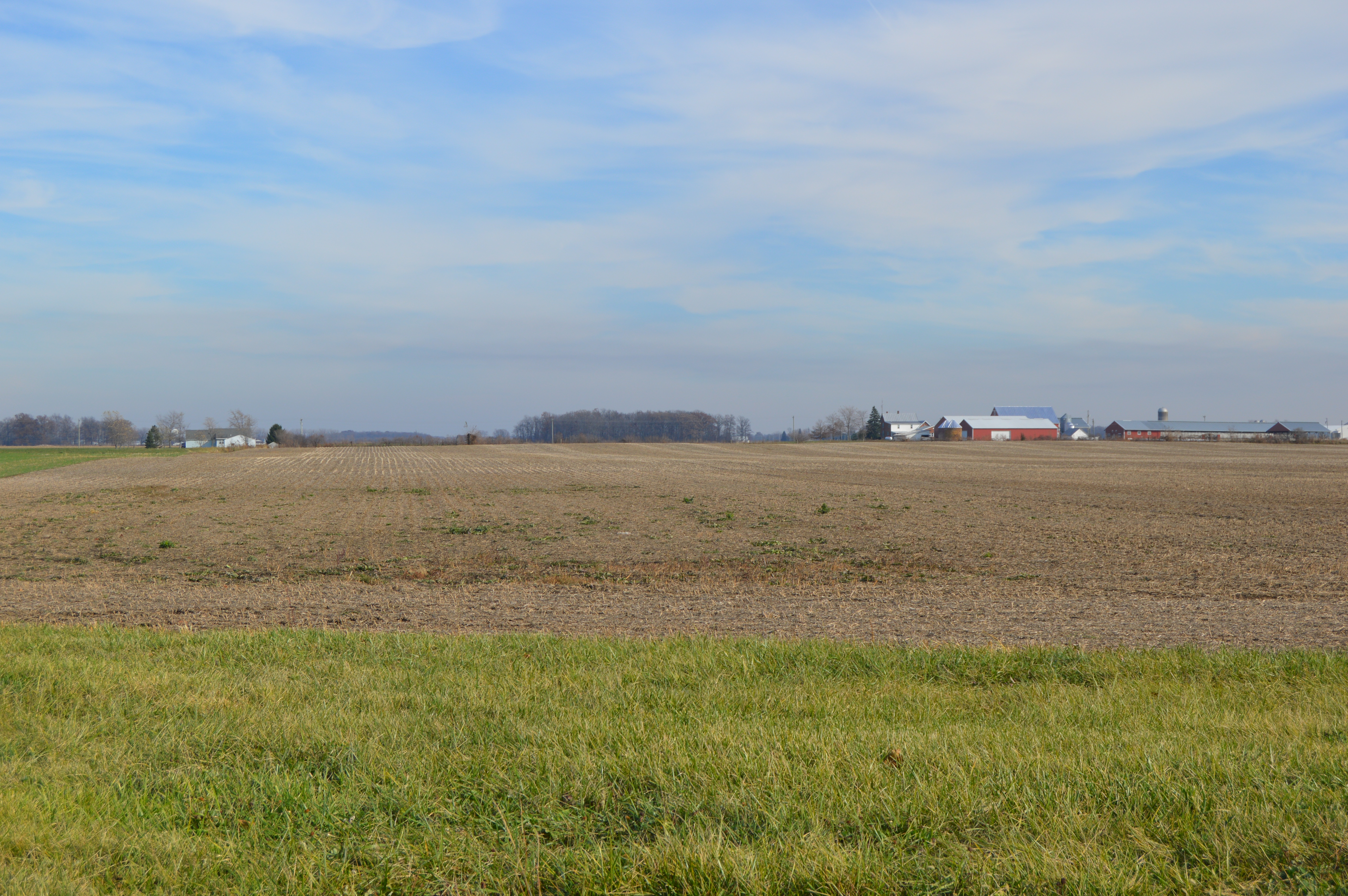
- Farms west of Fort Loramie

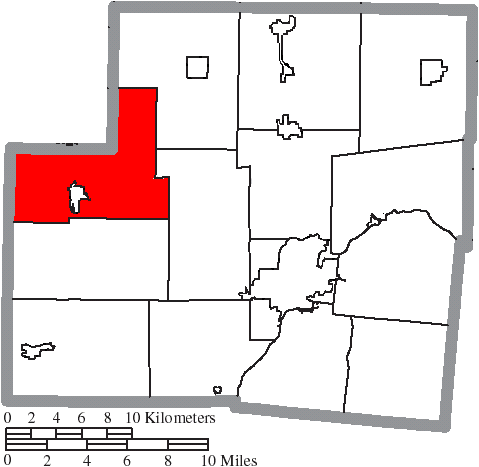
- Location of McLean Township in Shelby County
- Coordinates: 40°21′47″N 84°22′11″W
- Country: United States
- State: Ohio
- County: Shelby

Area
  - Total: 33.5 sq mi (86.7 km^{2})
  - Land: 32.2 sq mi (83.5 km^{2})
  - Water: 1.2 sq mi (3.1 km^{2})
- Elevation: 958 ft (292 m)

Population (2020)
  - Total: 3,378
  - Density: 105/sq mi (40.4/km^{2})
- Time zone: UTC-5 (Eastern (EST))
  - Summer (DST): UTC-4 (EDT)
- FIPS code: 39-46172
- GNIS feature ID: 1086965

McLean Township is one of the fourteen townships of Shelby County, Ohio, United States. The 2020 census found 3,378 people in the township.

== Geography ==
Located in the western part of the county, it borders the following townships:

- Van Buren Township – northeast
- Turtle Creek Township – east
- Cynthian Township – south
- Patterson Township, Darke County – southwest
- Marion Township, Mercer County – west
- Jackson Township, Auglaize County – northwest, south of German Township
- German Township, Auglaize County – northwest corner, north of Jackson Township

The village of Fort Loramie is located in the center of the township. The village of Minster occupies a small tract of land in the north of the township along the county border.

== Name and history ==
McLean Township was established in 1834. It is the only McLean Township statewide.

== Government ==
The township is governed by a three-member board of trustees, who are elected in November of odd-numbered years to a four-year term beginning on the following January 1. Two are elected in the year after the presidential election and one is elected in the year before it. There is also an elected township fiscal officer, who serves a four-year term beginning on April 1 of the year after the election, which is held in November of the year before the presidential election. Vacancies in the fiscal officership or on the board of trustees are filled by the remaining trustees.
