= Houston, Ohio =

Unincorporated community in Ohio, U.S.

Coordinates: 40°15′08″N 84°20′11″W

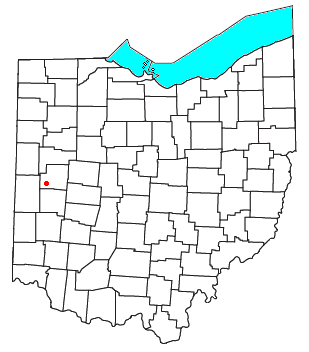
Location of Houston, Ohio

Houston (/ˈhaʊstən/ HOW-stən) is an unincorporated community in northern Loramie Township, Shelby County, Ohio, United States. It has a post office, a Dollar General, and a grain elevator.

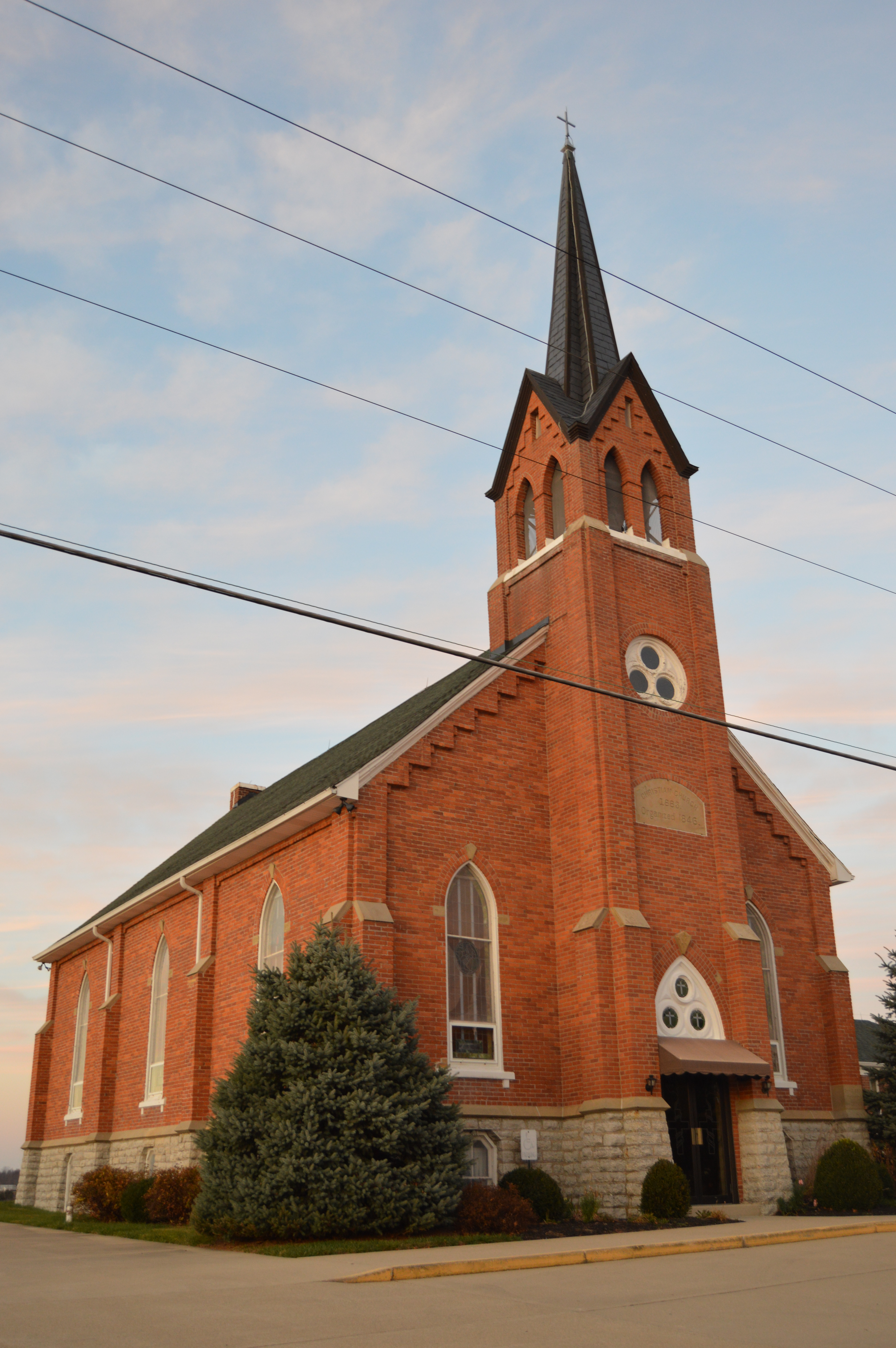
Houston Congregational Christian Church

The transmitter site of WHIO-FM (formerly WPTW-FM, WCLR and WDPT respectively and licensed to Piqua) is located south of the community on Aiken Road adjacent to State Route 66.

The southern portion of the community was once known as Mount Jefferson, according to vintage road maps of the county before consolidation in the 1950s.

The unincorporated junction of Dawson is located a mile to the east on Hardin-Houston Station Road near the Conrail tracks. Further east by two miles is Bunker Hill within rural Loramie Township, noted for the Bunker Hill Baptist Church located near a wooded area and near the intersection of Houston Road and Patterson-Halpin Road.

== History ==
A post office called Houston has been in operation since 1835. Houston was platted in 1838 by Harvey Houston, and named for him. The community comprises three towns from the past. North Houston was founded on November 1, 1855 by Asa Young after the Big Four (Penn Central) Railroad was built. South Houston was founded May 4, 1838 by Harvey Houston. Mount Jefferson was located between the two towns and was founded January 12, 1838 by Samuel Farnum. In April 1957 the communities blended and took the name of Houston. Houston, Ohio, marked its 170th anniversary in 2008

== Education ==
It is home to Hardin-Houston Local School, which serves grades k-12 and has approximately 800 students. Houston is part of the Hardin-Houston School District.
