= Wilson–Lenox House =

Historic house in Ohio, United States

- U.S. National Register of Historic Places
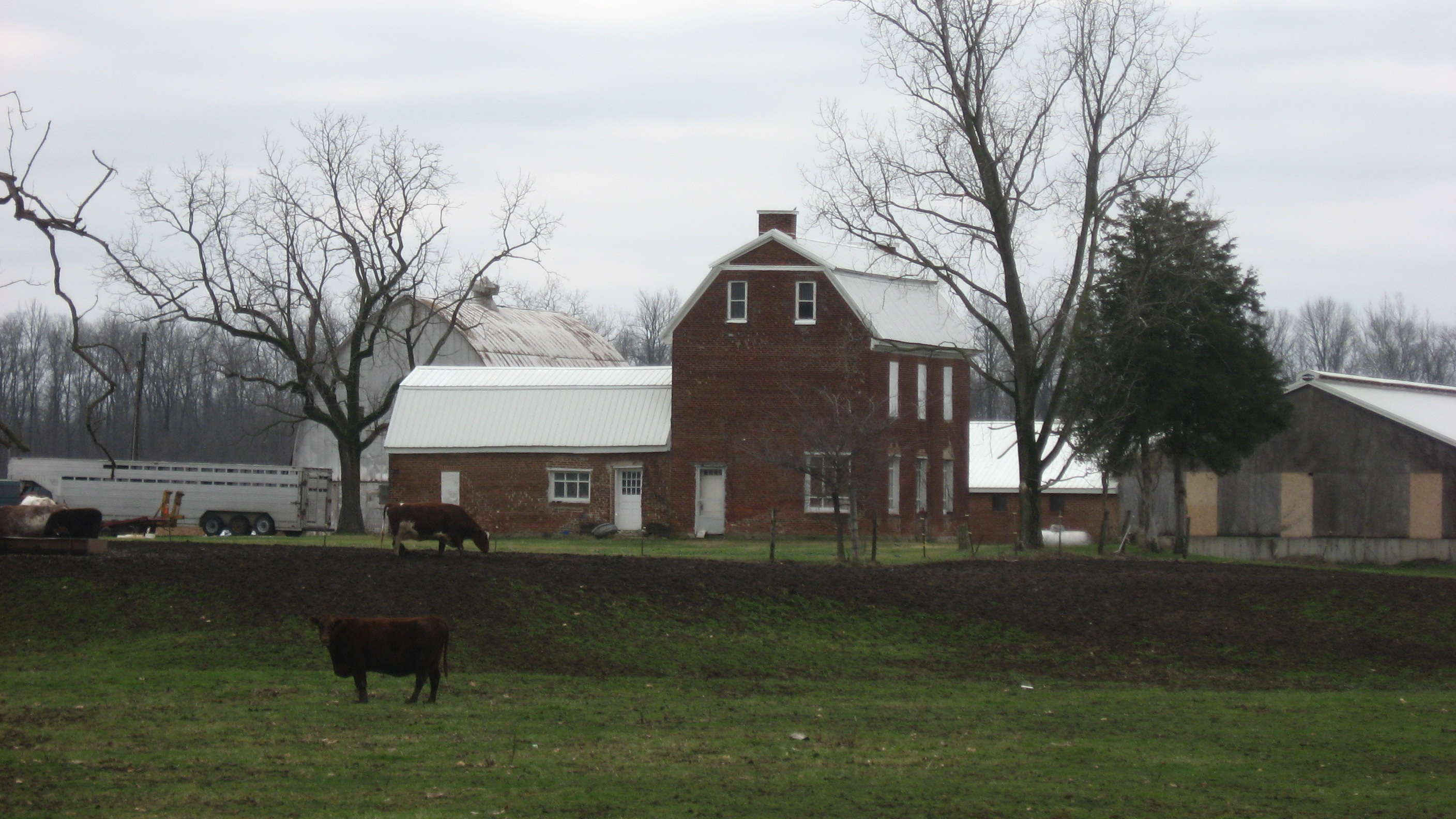
- Northern side of the house, surrounded by other buildings

- Location within Ohio Location within the United States
- Location: 9804 Houston Rd., Washington Township, Shelby County, Ohio
- Nearest city: Sidney
- Coordinates: 40°15′21″N 84°14′55″W
- Area: less than one acre
- Built: 1816
- Architectural style: Dutch Colonial
- NRHP reference No.: 80003233
- Added to NRHP: March 27, 1980

The Wilson–Lenox House, also known as the "Marvin Ditmer House", is a historic house west of Sidney in Washington Township, Shelby County, Ohio, United States. Built in the Dutch Colonial style, the house was built in the 1810s; it was the first brick house in Shelby County. Sources disagree about its date of construction: some believe that it was built in 1810, while others hold that it was erected in 1816.

John Wilson settled in present-day Washington Township in 1807, having come from Warren County with his family. Here he built his homestead, including the county's first brick house, and he quickly grew in wealth. His daughter Sally married James Lenox, a native of Virginia who moved to Washington Township in 1845; their son was Hamilton Clay ("H.C.") Lenox, a well-known resident of the area who inhabited the house until his unexpected death on August 20, 1893.

Lenox's Dutch Colonial house is a two-and-a-half story building with a gambrel roof. Built on a foundation of sandstone, its walls are brick with limestone elements. Because of its well-preserved architecture, the house was listed on the National Register of Historic Places in 1980. As the county's oldest brick house, it was seen as a prominent example of settlement-era architecture in its vicinity.
