= Mount Jefferson, Ohio =

Unincorporated community in Ohio, U.S.

Coordinates: 40°14′33″N 84°20′00″W

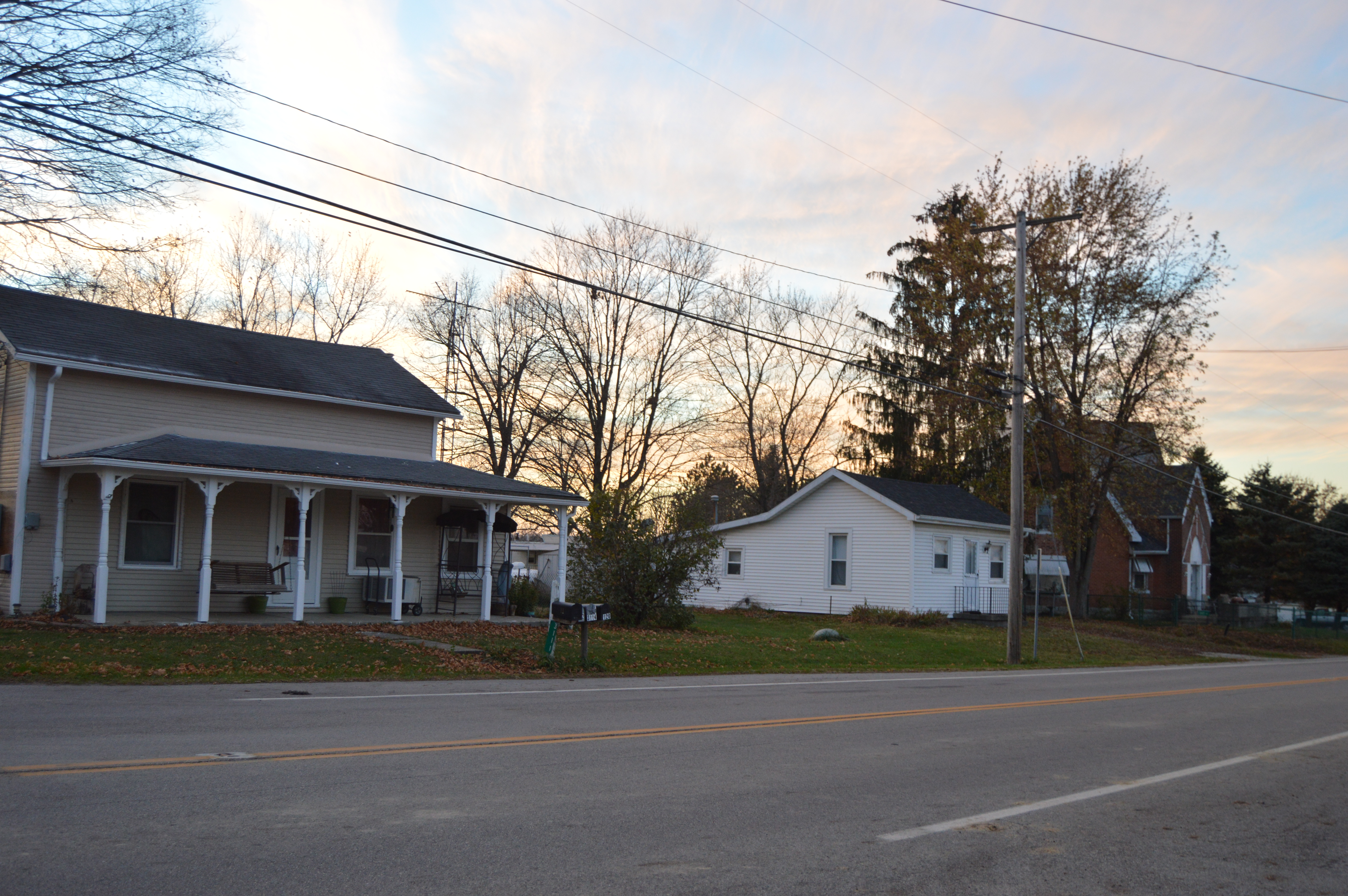
Houses on State Route 66

Mount Jefferson is an unincorporated community in Loramie Township, Shelby County, Ohio, United States. It lies along State Route 66 south of Houston. At 961 feet (293 m) above sea level, it is not on a summit, but is located on the south slope of the valley formed by Ninemile Creek, a tributary of Loramie Creek.

Mount Jefferson was platted on January 12, 1838, by Jonathan Counts on land owned by Samuel Farnum. Three churches—Christian, Episcopal, and Presbyterian—were organized in the community, but it never grew significantly; only one store and a few houses were ever built in the community.
