= Yorkshire, Ohio =

- Village
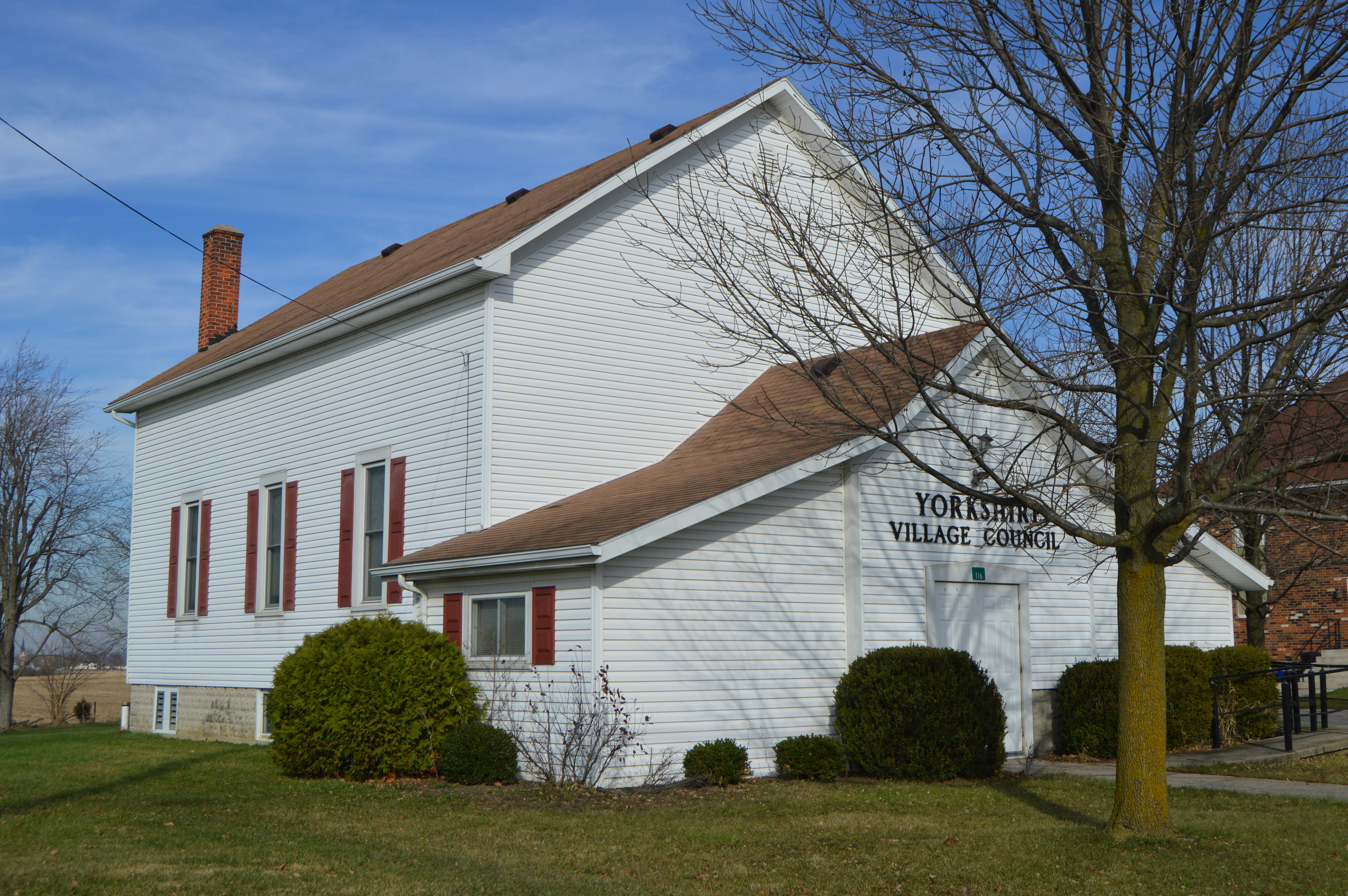
- Village hall

- Location in Darke County and the state of Ohio
- Coordinates: 40°19′32″N 84°29′43″W
- Country: United States
- State: Ohio
- County: Darke
- Township: Patterson

Area
  - Total: 0.27 sq mi (0.70 km^{2})
  - Land: 0.27 sq mi (0.70 km^{2})
  - Water: 0 sq mi (0.00 km^{2})
- Elevation: 981 ft (299 m)

Population (2020)
  - Total: 95
  - Density: 352.1/sq mi (135.94/km^{2})
- Time zone: UTC-5 (Eastern (EST))
  - Summer (DST): UTC-4 (EDT)
- ZIP code: 45388
- Area code: 419
- FIPS code: 39-87164
- GNIS feature ID: 2399753

Yorkshire is a village in Darke County, Ohio, United States. The population was 95 at the 2020 census.

== History ==
Yorkshire was incorporated in 1901. In its early years, the village grew rapidly; the population was 182 at the 1910 census.

== Geography ==
According to the United States Census Bureau, the village has a total area of 0.28 square miles (0.73 km^{2}), all land.

== Demographics ==
Historical population
Census	Pop.	Note	%±
1910	182		—
1920	123		−32.4%
1930	131		6.5%
1940	134		2.3%
1950	142		6.0%
1960	182		28.2%
1970	151		−17.0%
1980	146		−3.3%
1990	126		−13.7%
2000	110		−12.7%
2010	96		−12.7%
2020	95		−1.0%
U.S. Decennial Census

=== 2010 census ===
As of the census of 2010, there were 96 people, 36 households, and 21 families living in the village. The population density was 342.9 inhabitants per square mile (132.4/km^{2}). There were 40 housing units at an average density of 142.9 per square mile (55.2/km^{2}). The racial makeup of the village was 95.8% White and 4.2% from two or more races.

There were 36 households, of which 30.6% had children under the age of 18 living with them, 41.7% were married couples living together, 8.3% had a female householder with no husband present, 8.3% had a male householder with no wife present, and 41.7% were non-families. 30.6% of all households were made up of individuals, and 11.2% had someone living alone who was 65 years of age or older. The average household size was 2.67 and the average family size was 3.33.

The median age in the village was 31.3 years. 24% of residents were under the age of 18; 13.6% were between the ages of 18 and 24; 28.1% were from 25 to 44; 21.9% were from 45 to 64; and 12.5% were 65 years of age or older. The gender makeup of the village was 53.1% male and 46.9% female.

=== 2000 census ===
As of the census of 2000, there were 110 people, 37 households, and 25 families living in the village. The population density was 390.1 inhabitants per square mile (150.6/km^{2}). There were 41 housing units at an average density of 145.4 per square mile (56.1/km^{2}). The racial makeup of the village was 98.18% White, 0.91% African American, and 0.91% from two or more races.

There were 37 households, out of which 37.8% had children under the age of 18 living with them, 62.2% were married couples living together, and 32.4% were non-families. 32.4% of all households were made up of individuals, and 18.9% had someone living alone who was 65 years of age or older. The average household size was 2.97 and the average family size was 3.92.

In the village, the population was spread out, with 32.7% under the age of 18, 9.1% from 18 to 24, 25.5% from 25 to 44, 19.1% from 45 to 64, and 13.6% who were 65 years of age or older. The median age was 32 years. For every 100 females there were 86.4 males. For every 100 females age 18 and over, there were 111.4 males.

The median income for a household in the village was $38,750, and the median income for a family was $43,750. Males had a median income of $36,667 versus $17,500 for females. The per capita income for the village was $15,077. There were no families and 3.2% of the population living below the poverty line, including no under eighteens and 18.8% of those over 64.
