= Uno, Ohio =

Unincorporated community in Ohio, U.S.

Coordinates: 40°20′40″N 84°15′56″W

Uno is an unincorporated community in northwestern Turtle Creek Township in Shelby County, in the U.S. state of Ohio.

== History ==
A post office called Uno was established in 1876, and remained in operation until 1904. In 1913, Uno had about 22 inhabitants.
