= Clinton Township, Shelby County, Ohio =

Township in Ohio, US

- Township
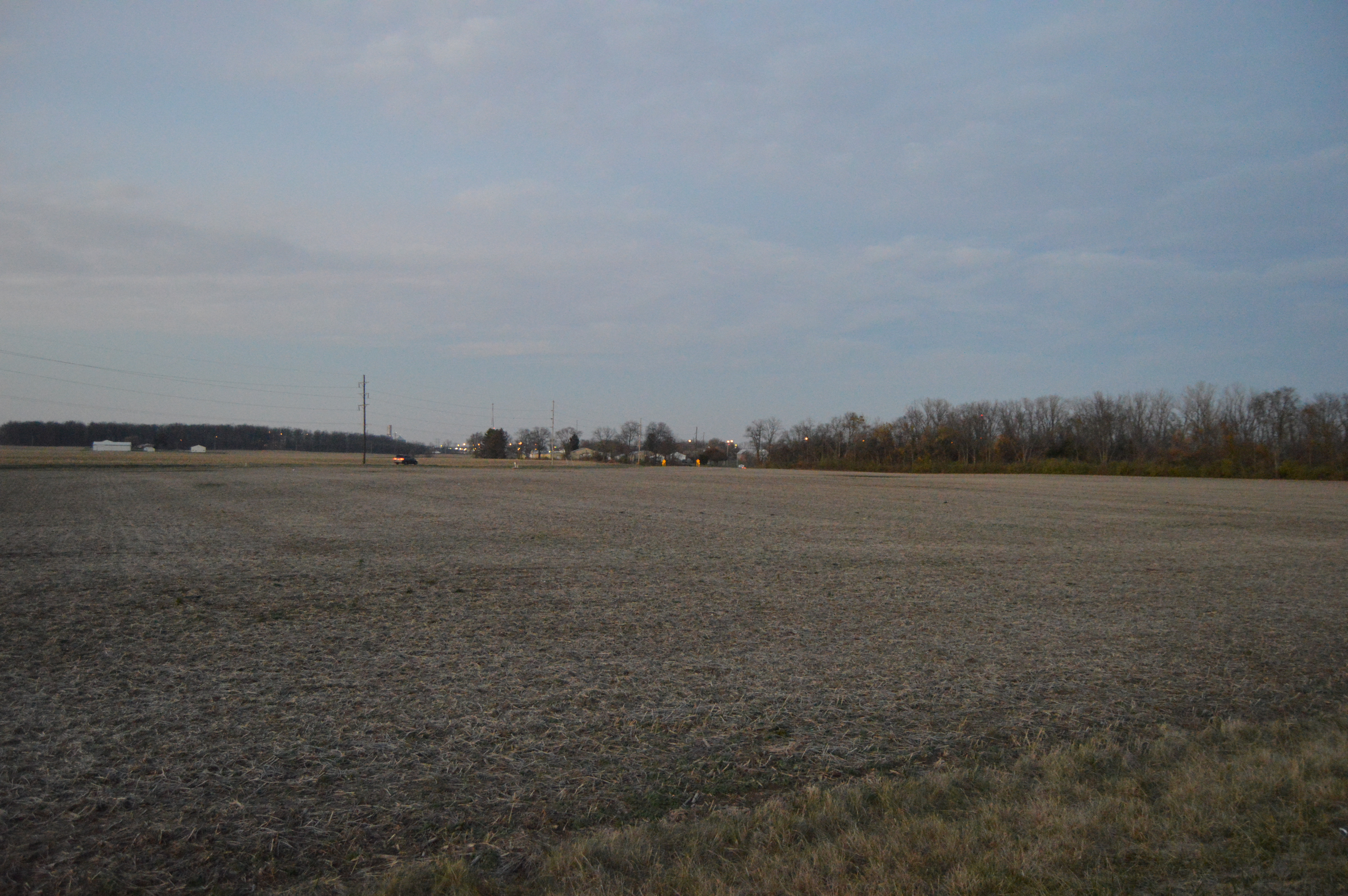
- Farm fields on Schenck Road, southwest of Sidney

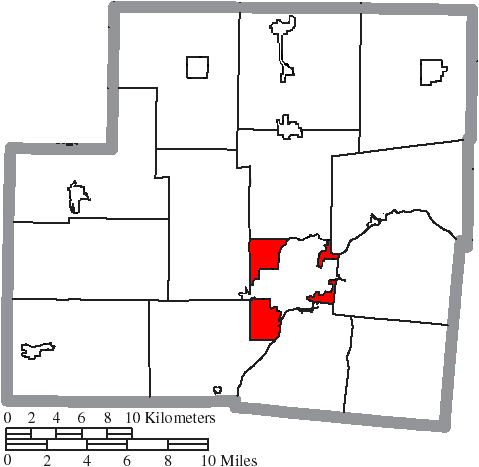
- Location of Clinton Township in Shelby County
- Coordinates: 40°17′17″N 84°9′43″W
- Country: United States
- State: Ohio
- County: Shelby

Area
  - Total: 16.8 sq mi (43.4 km^{2})
  - Land: 16.7 sq mi (43.2 km^{2})
  - Water: 0.077 sq mi (0.2 km^{2})
- Elevation: 1,037 ft (316 m)

Population (2020)
  - Total: 20,317
  - Density: 1,218/sq mi (470.3/km^{2})
- Time zone: UTC-5 (Eastern (EST))
  - Summer (DST): UTC-4 (EDT)
- FIPS code: 39-16168
- GNIS feature ID: 1086958

Clinton Township is one of the fourteen townships of Shelby County, Ohio, United States. The 2020 census found 20,317 people in the township.

== Geography ==
Located in the southern part of the county, it borders the following townships:

- Franklin Township - north
- Salem Township - northeast
- Perry Township - east
- Orange Township - south
- Washington Township - southwest
- Turtle Creek Township - northwest

Most of Clinton Township is occupied by the city of Sidney, the county seat of Shelby County.

== Name ==
Clinton Township was organized in 1825. It is one of seven Clinton Townships statewide.

== Government ==
The township is governed by a three-member board of trustees, who are elected in November of odd-numbered years to a four-year term beginning on the following January 1. Two are elected in the year after the presidential election and one is elected in the year before it. There is also an elected township fiscal officer, who serves a four-year term beginning on April 1 of the year after the election, which is held in November of the year before the presidential election. Vacancies in the fiscal officership or on the board of trustees are filled by the remaining trustees.
