= Clinton Township, Seneca County, Ohio =

Township in Ohio, US

- Township
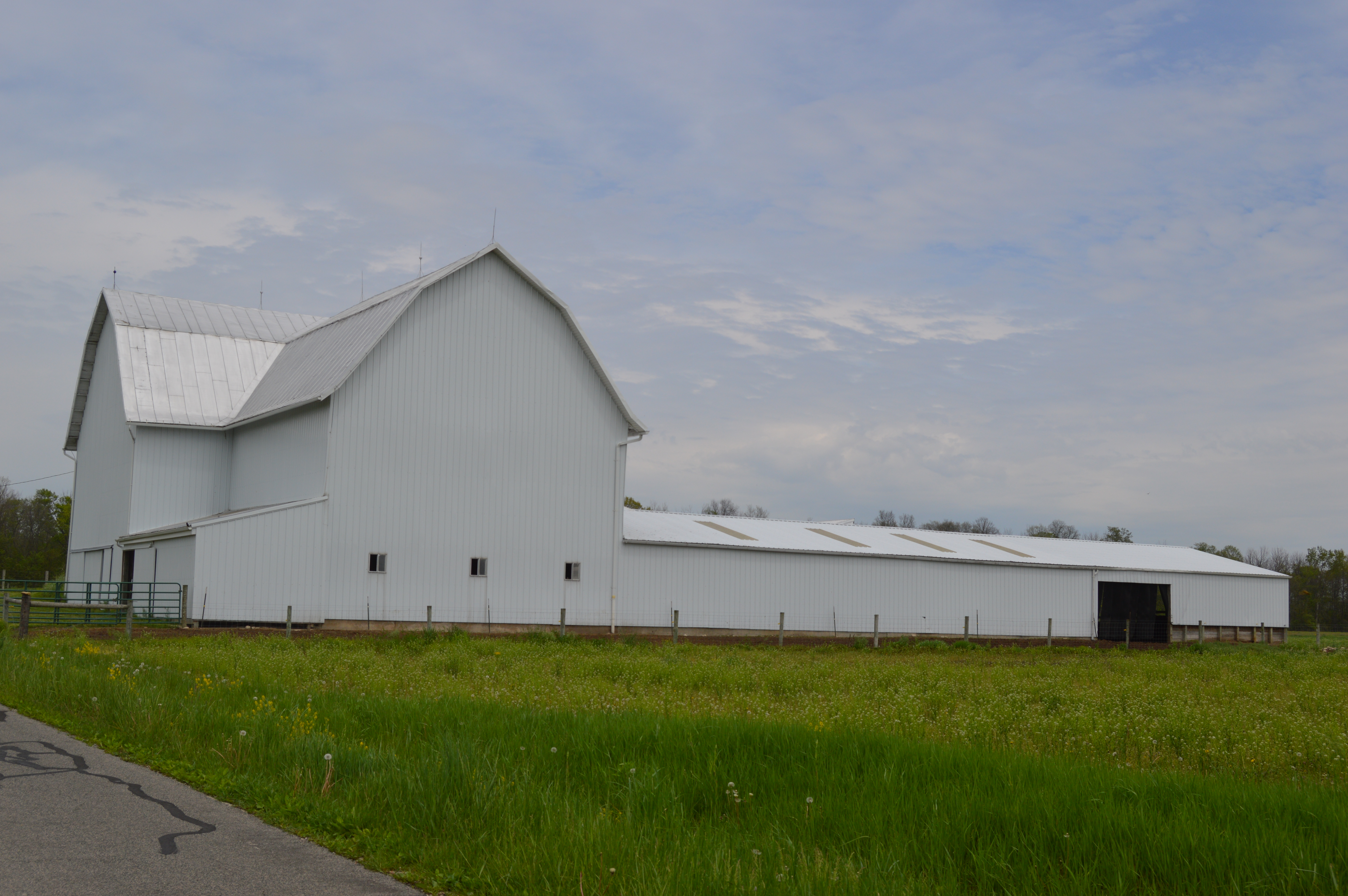
- Barn on County Road 17

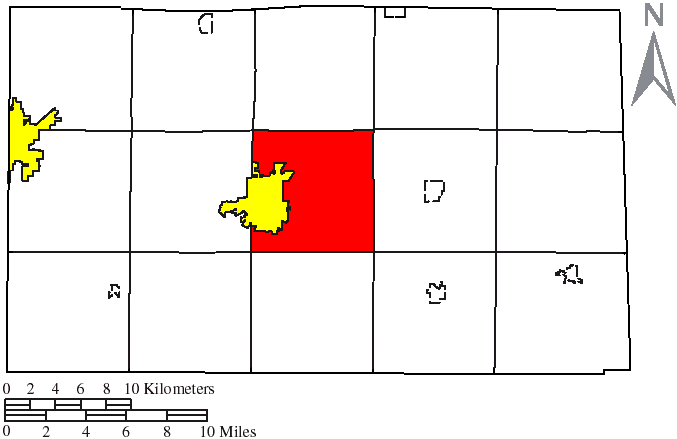
- Location of Clinton Township (red) in Seneca County, adjacent to the city of Tiffin (yellow).
- Coordinates: 41°7′23″N 83°8′16″W
- Country: United States
- State: Ohio
- County: Seneca

Area
  - Total: 31.1 sq mi (80.5 km^{2})
  - Land: 31.0 sq mi (80.2 km^{2})
  - Water: 0.12 sq mi (0.3 km^{2})
- Elevation: 768 ft (234 m)

Population (2020)
  - Total: 4,105
  - Density: 133/sq mi (51.2/km^{2})
- Time zone: UTC-5 (Eastern (EST))
  - Summer (DST): UTC-4 (EDT)
- FIPS code: 39-16154
- GNIS feature ID: 1086943
- Website: https://clintontwpsenecacounty.com/

Clinton Township is one of the fifteen townships of Seneca County, Ohio, United States. It is also the most populated township in the county. The 2020 census found 4,105 people in the township.

== Geography ==
Located in the center of the county, it borders the following townships:

- Pleasant Township - north
- Adams Township - northeast corner
- Scipio Township - east
- Bloom Township - southeast corner
- Eden Township - south
- Seneca Township - southwest corner
- Hopewell Township - west
- Liberty Township - northwest corner

== Name and history ==
Clinton Township was organized in 1820. It was named for DeWitt Clinton, 6th Governor of New York.

It is one of seven Clinton Townships statewide.

== Government ==
The township is governed by a three-member board of trustees, who are elected in November of odd-numbered years to a four-year term beginning on the following January 1. Two are elected in the year after the presidential election and one is elected in the year before it. There is also an elected township fiscal officer, who serves a four-year term beginning on April 1 of the year after the election, which is held in November of the year before the presidential election. Vacancies in the fiscal officership or on the board of trustees are filled by the remaining trustees.
