= Clinton Township, Franklin County, Ohio =

Township in Ohio, US

- Township
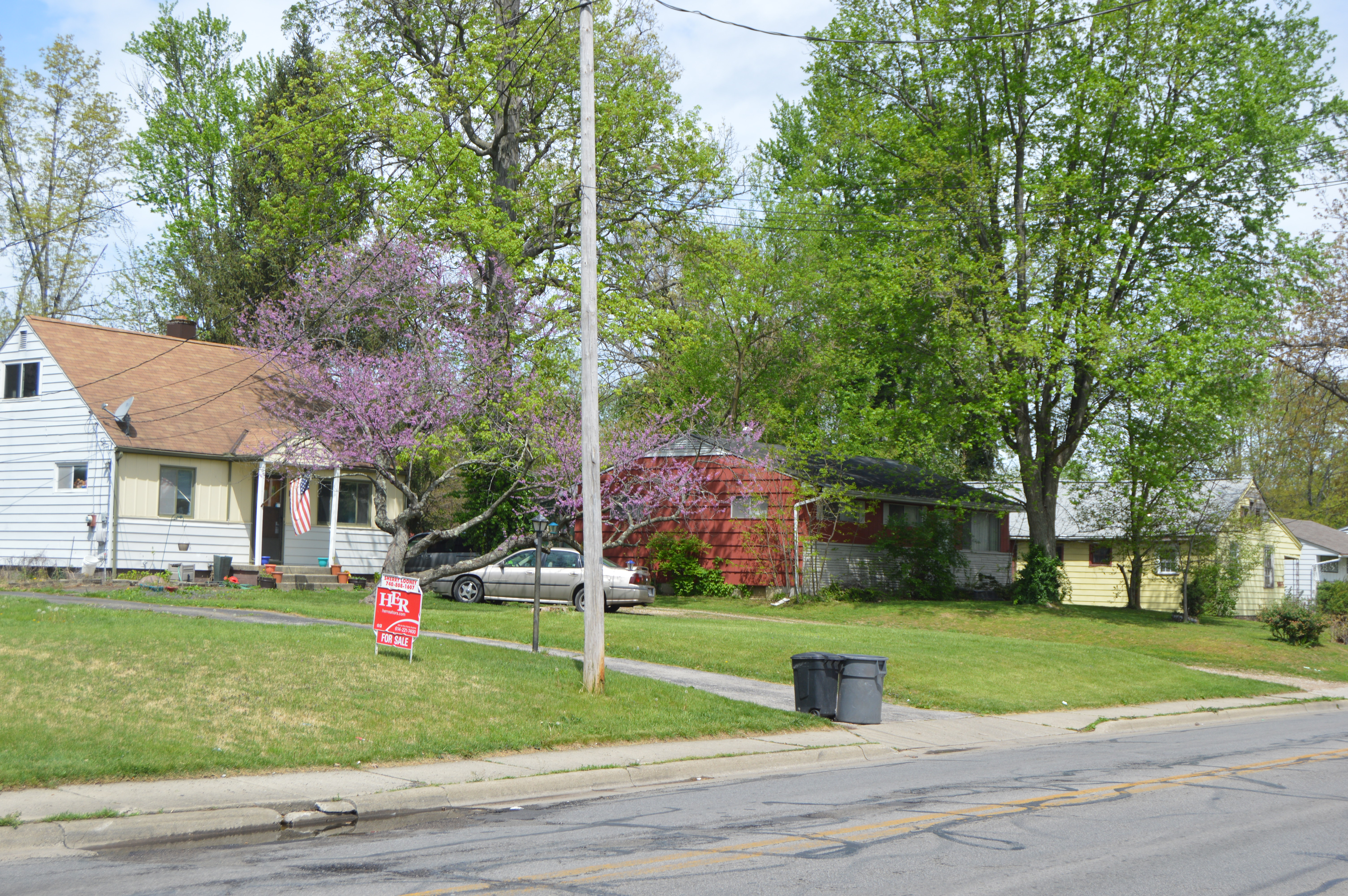
- Houses on Walford Street

- Location of Clinton Township in Franklin County.
- Coordinates: 40°2′2″N 82°58′15″W
- Country: United States
- State: Ohio
- County: Franklin

Area
  - Total: 1.4 sq mi (3.6 km^{2})
  - Land: 1.4 sq mi (3.6 km^{2})
  - Water: 0 sq mi (0 km^{2})
- Elevation: 890 ft (270 m)

Population (2020)
  - Total: 4,499
  - Density: 3,200/sq mi (1,200/km^{2})
- Time zone: UTC-5 (Eastern (EST))
  - Summer (DST): UTC-4 (EDT)
- FIPS code: 39-16112
- GNIS feature ID: 1086100
- Website: https://www.clintontownship.org/

Clinton Township is one of the seventeen townships of Franklin County, Ohio, United States. The 2020 census found 4,499 people in the township.

== Geography ==
Clinton Township consists of many scattered "islands" of land surrounded by the city of Columbus, the county seat of Franklin County.

== Name and history ==
It is one of seven Clinton Townships statewide.

Clinton Township was settled in 1800 as a rural community. At one time, a circus, the Sells Brothers Circus, operated in what today is the area of University View. In the eastern part of the township, what is now Cleveland Avenue was once known as Harbor Street. Clinton Township lost territory from the 1950s through the early 1970s via annexation.

== Government ==
The township is governed by a three-member board of trustees, who are elected in November of odd-numbered years to a four-year term beginning on the following January 1. Two are elected in the year after the presidential election and one is elected in the year before it. There is also an elected township fiscal officer, who serves a four-year term beginning on April 1 of the year after the election, which is held in November of the year before the presidential election. Vacancies in the fiscal officership or on the board of trustees are filled by the remaining trustees.
