= St. Nicholas Catholic Church (Osgood, Ohio) =

- St. Nicholas Catholic Church and Rectory
- U.S. National Register of Historic Places
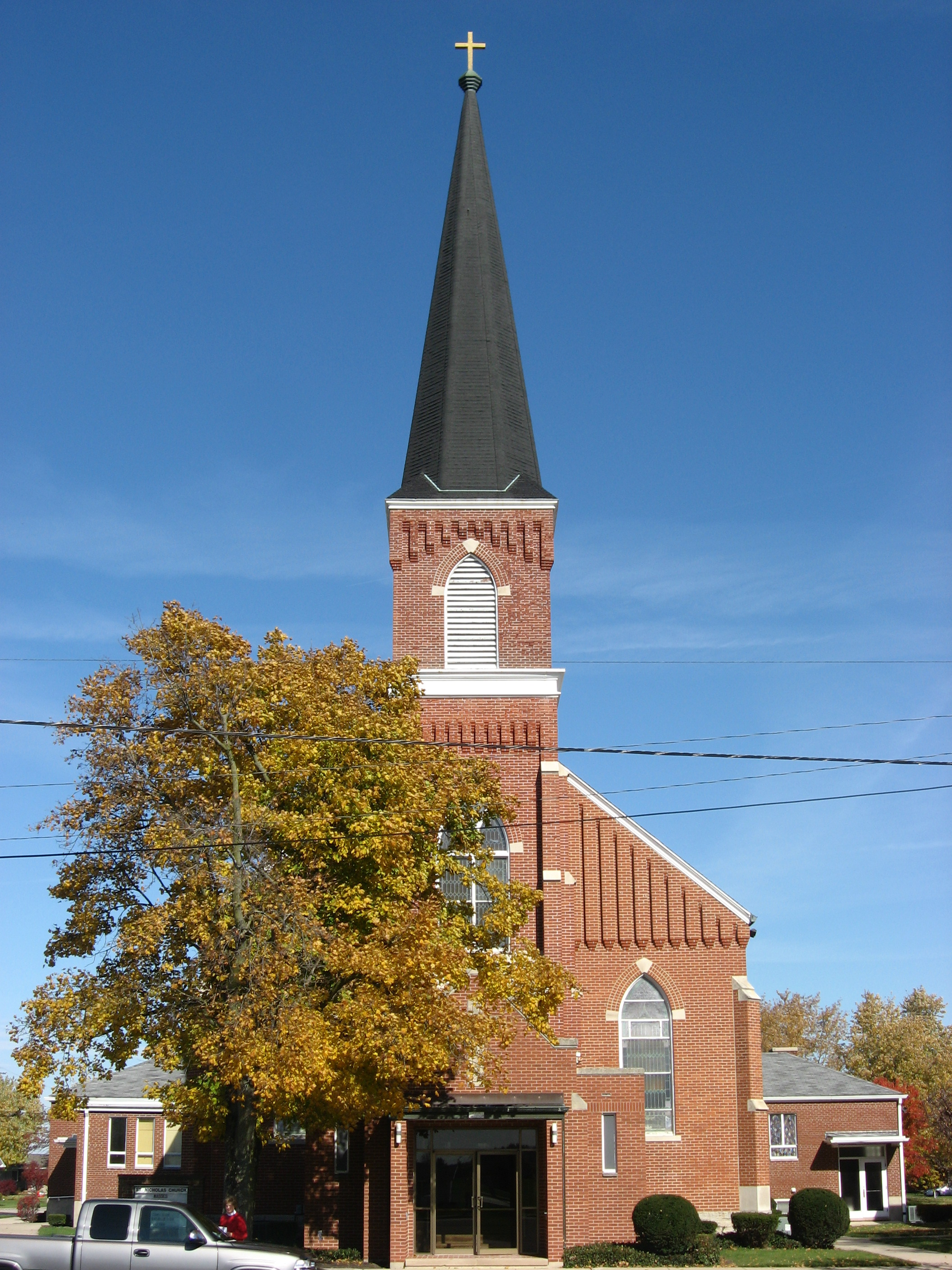
- Front of the church

- Location within Ohio Location within the United States
- Location: State Route 705 and Washington St., Osgood, Ohio
- Coordinates: 40°20′26″N 84°29′33″W
- Area: Less than 1 acre (0.40 ha)
- Built: 1907
- Architect: Edward Schlochtmeyer
- Architectural style: Gothic Revival
- MPS: Cross-Tipped Churches of Ohio TR
- NRHP reference No.: 79002841
- Added to NRHP: July 26, 1979

St. Nicholas Catholic Church is a historic Roman Catholic church in Osgood, Ohio, United States. Built in the first years of the 20th century, it houses one of the newest parishes in a heavily Catholic region of far western Ohio, but it has been recognized as a historic site for its architecture.

== Parish history ==
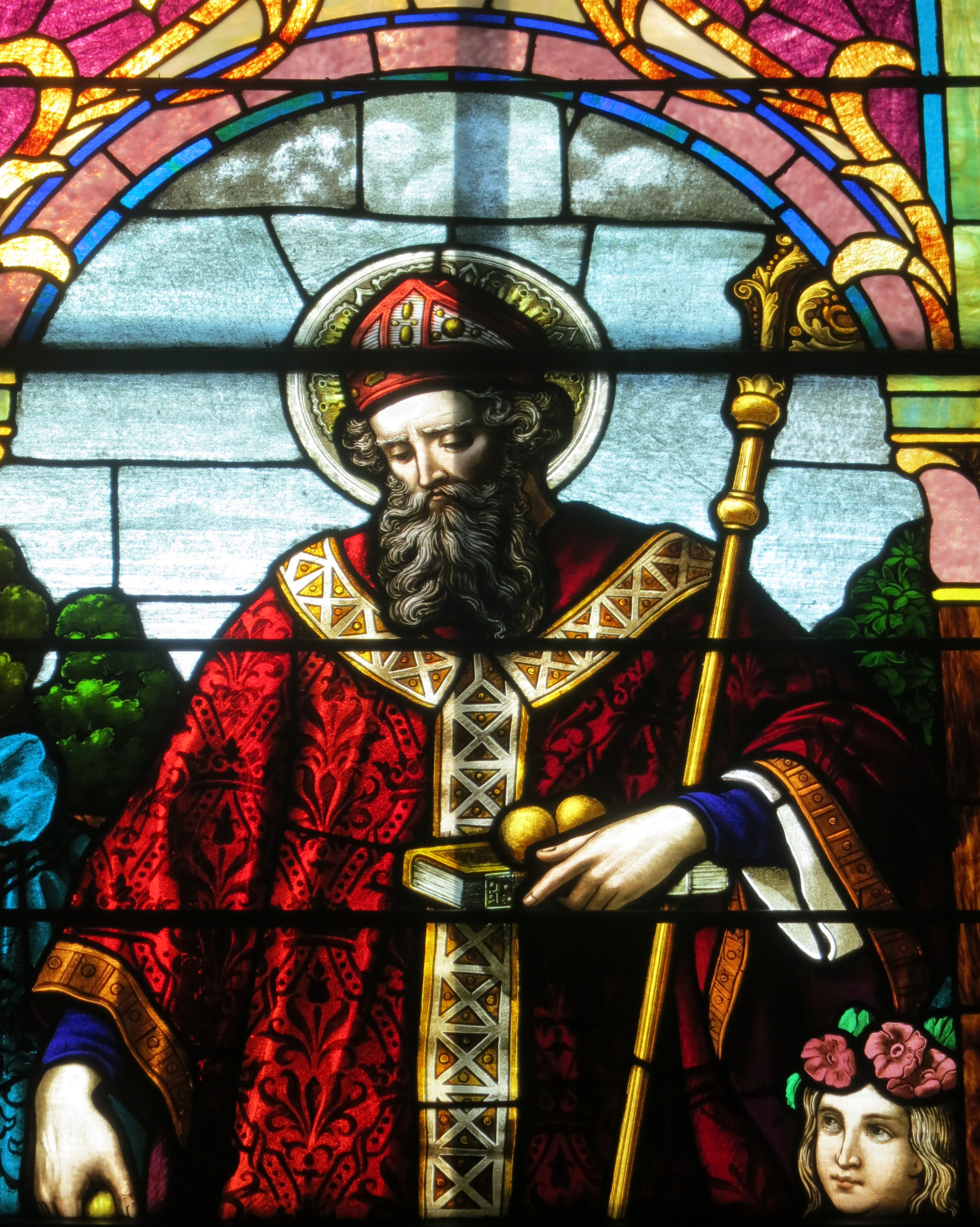
A stained glass window in the church depicting Saint Nicholas

Although Osgood lies near such heavily Catholic communities such as Minster and Fort Loramie, its early settlers were predominantly Protestant. Accordingly, the formation of a Catholic parish in Osgood came far later than the formation of parishes in nearby villages; St. Augustine's Church in Minster and St. Michael's Church in Fort Loramie were established by 1850, but the foundations of a parish in Osgood were not laid until 1904, and formal establishment of the parish came in 1906. In its earliest years, the Mass was celebrated in common buildings; after worshipping for a time in a school, the parishioners purchased a barn for ecclesiastical purposes. For many years, the improvement of the parish's facilities was hindered by its size; the fewness of its members meant that money was frequently scarce. Nevertheless, parishioners took significant steps in late 1906; their first temporary church was completed in September, and in this year they purchased a tract of land on the eastern side of the village. Construction of a permanent brick church soon began, and the finished church was dedicated on September 6, 1908 after costing $22,000. By 1914, membership had increased to eighty-five families from just thirty-five families in 1906.

== Structure ==
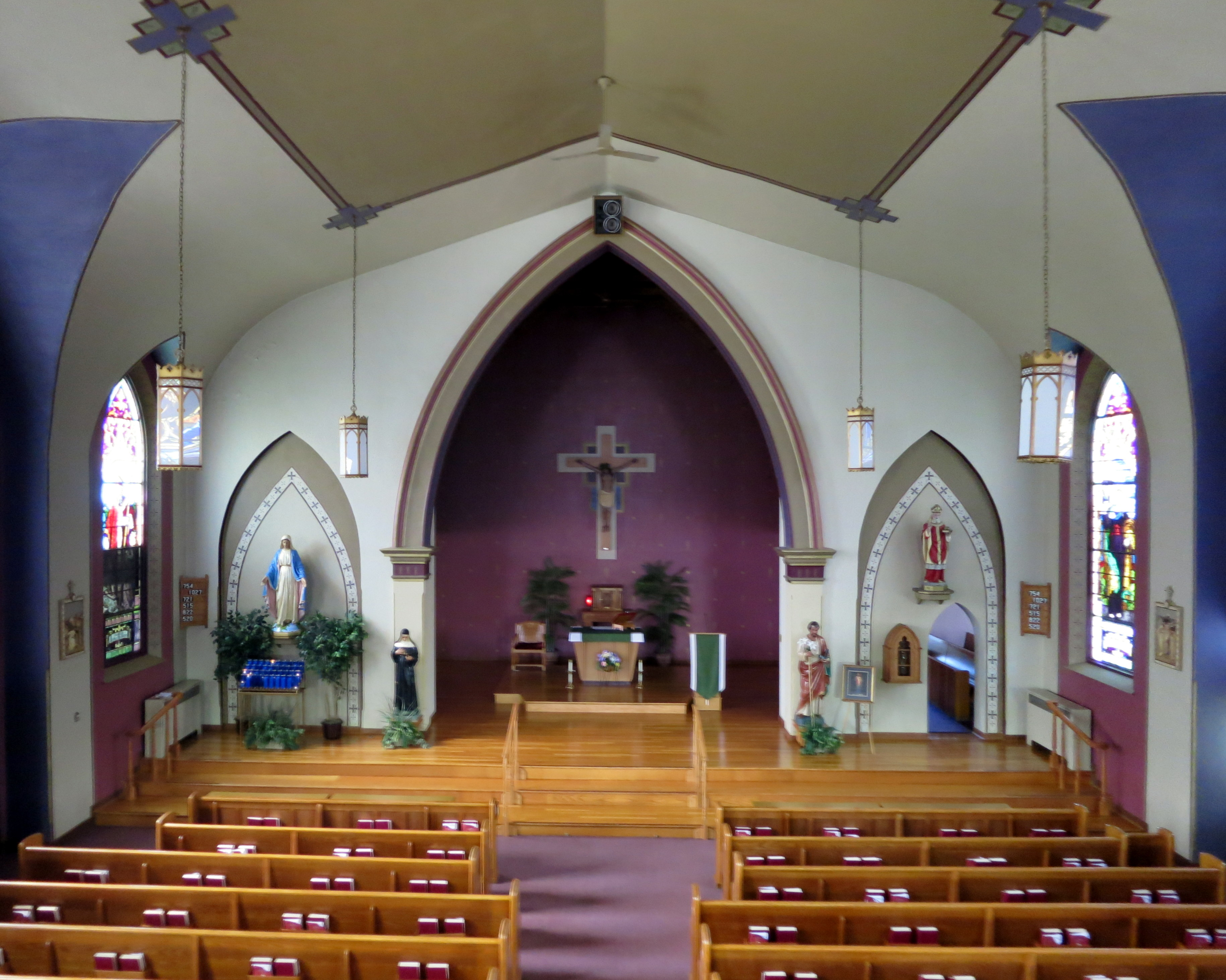
The church nave.

The church rests upon a stone foundation with a basement. Brick walls, trimmed with stone, are laid in a stretcher bond, and the building is covered by an asphalt roof. Its plan is primarily that of a rectangle, but gables on each side have the effect of forming a slight transept.

The church's dominant feature is its octagonal steeple, located atop a tower at the entrance. Equipped with a belfry and ornamented with corbelling, the tower is topped with a golden cross. Worshippers enter the church through a vestibule and proceed through the base of the tower; until the addition with the vestibule was built in 1970, the church's exterior doors were a part of the tower.

== Rectory ==
Parishioners erected a brick rectory for their pastor in 1914. Supported by a foundation with a basement and topped with an asphalt hip roof, the two-story house lies adjacent to the church's eastern side. Among its features are a porch that faces the church on the house's western side and a dormer that pierces the house's southern roof. The house is a square, three bays wide on each of its sides.

== Preservation ==
In 1977, an architectural survey ranked St. Nicholas Church in good condition, both inside and out; it was noted that there were no significant threats to the building's continued existence. Two years later, the church and its rectory were added together to the National Register of Historic Places for their architectural significance. Twenty-six other church buildings in the Land of the Cross-Tipped Churches were listed on the National Register at the same time; two others in Darke County, St. Louis' Church in North Star and Holy Family Church in Frenchtown, were among these churches.

Today, St. Nicholas remains an active parish of the Archdiocese of Cincinnati. It is clustered with St. Louis parish in North Star and St. Remy's Catholic Church in Russia; the entire cluster is a part of the Sidney Deanery.
