= St. Louis Catholic Church (North Star, Ohio) =

- St. Louis Catholic Church and Rectory
- U.S. National Register of Historic Places
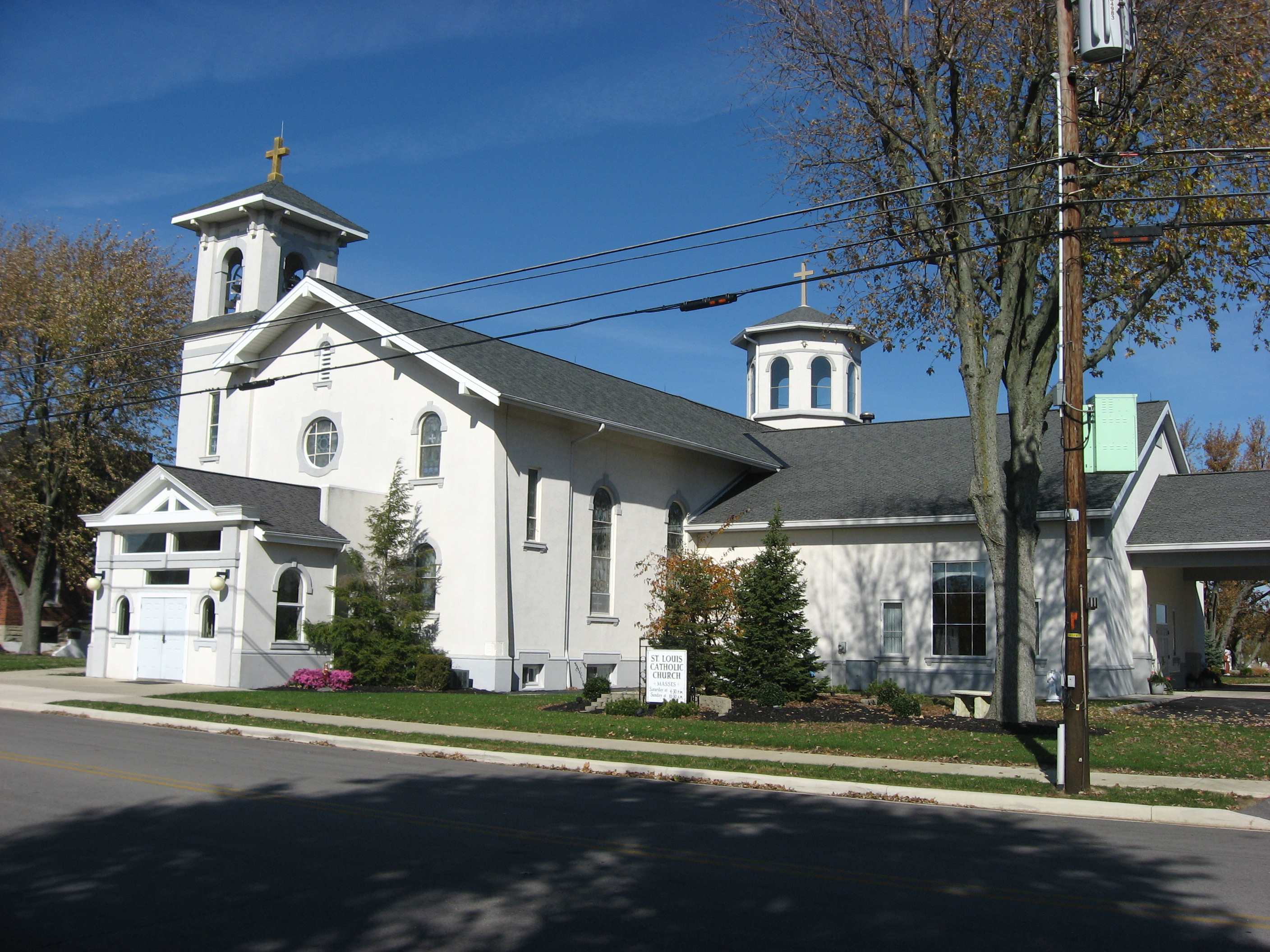
- Front and eastern side of the church

- Location within Ohio Location within the United States
- Location: East of the intersection of North Star Road and U.S. Route 127
- Nearest city: North Star, Ohio
- Coordinates: 40°19′29″N 84°34′13″W
- Area: Less than 1 acre (0.40 ha)
- Built: 1914
- MPS: Cross-Tipped Churches of Ohio TR
- NRHP reference No.: 79002835
- Added to NRHP: July 26, 1979

St. Louis Catholic Church is a historic Roman Catholic church in North Star, Ohio, United States. Constructed in the early twentieth century, it is one of the newest churches in a heavily Catholic region of far western Ohio, but it has been recognized as a historic site because of its unique architecture.

== Parish history ==
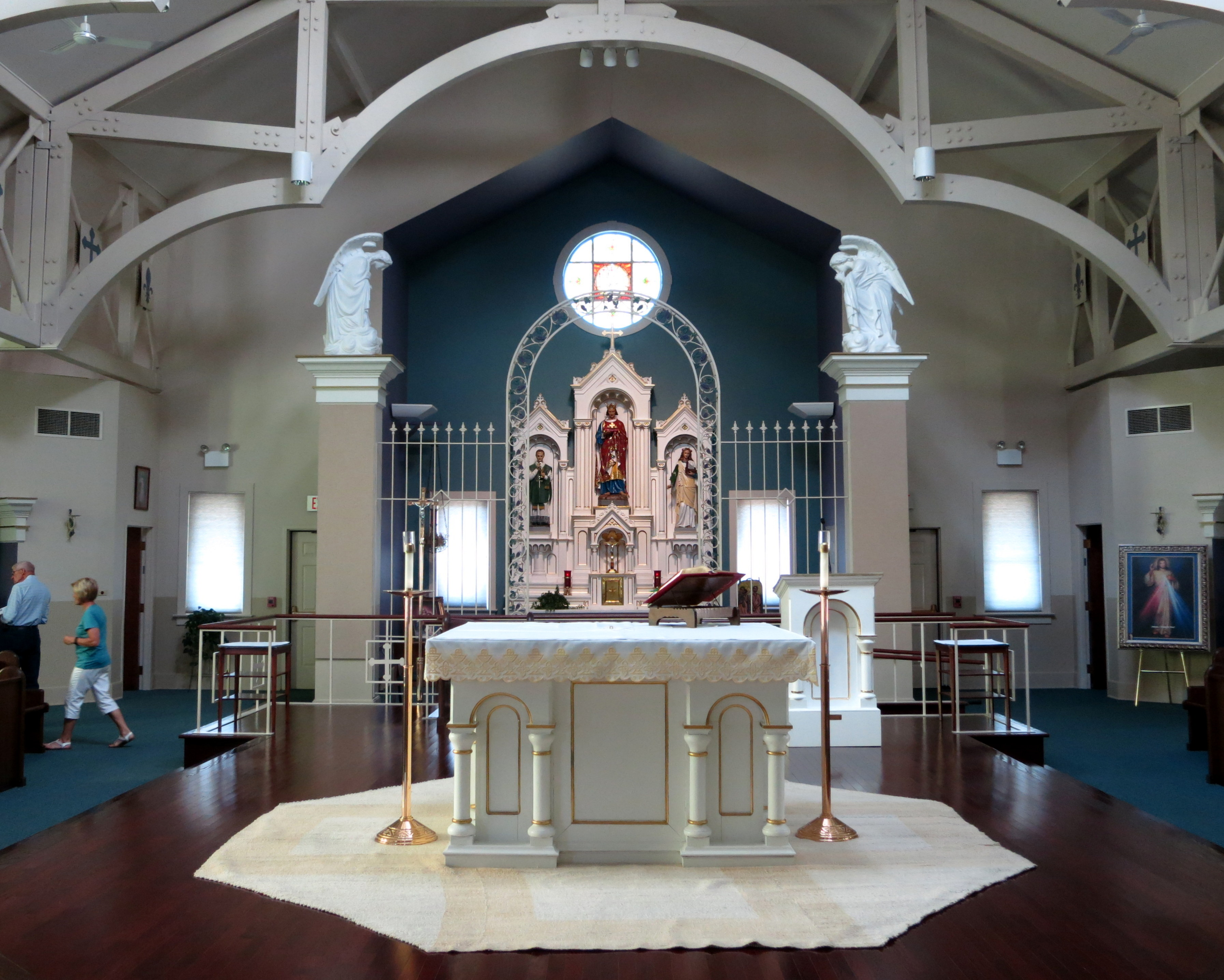
Interior

The parish that became St. Louis Church was established in the vicinity of North Star in 1892; and its first church was located in the countryside nearly 2 miles (3.2 km) east of North Star. Shortly after this building was completed in 1893, the parish was attached for administrative purposes to St. Denis parish in Versailles, approximately 7 miles (11 km) to the southeast. In 1906, the attachment was changed to St. Nicholas parish in Osgood, only 3 miles (4.8 km) away to the northeast. By the early 1910s, the parish had decided to move to North Star, and its new building was completed in the village in 1914. Still remaining at the church's original site is the parish cemetery, which lies at the intersection of Mangen and North Star-Fort Loramie Roads.

== Architecture ==
The church is a rectangular, single-story structure with multiple gables and an off-center square bell tower. Walls of white-painted stucco rest on a concrete foundation and are topped by an asphalt roof. The interior is lit by windows of many shapes and sizes: a rose window is located above the entrance, wide stained glass windows topped with rounded arches line the walls, and narrow rectangular windows appear in the tower. While the church reflects a range of architectural styles, many of its elements, such as the cornices on the bell tower, bear evidence of the French Renaissance style. No other Catholic church in the region resembles St. Louis Church; the ecclesiastical architecture of the region typically employs the Gothic Revival style.

== Rectory ==
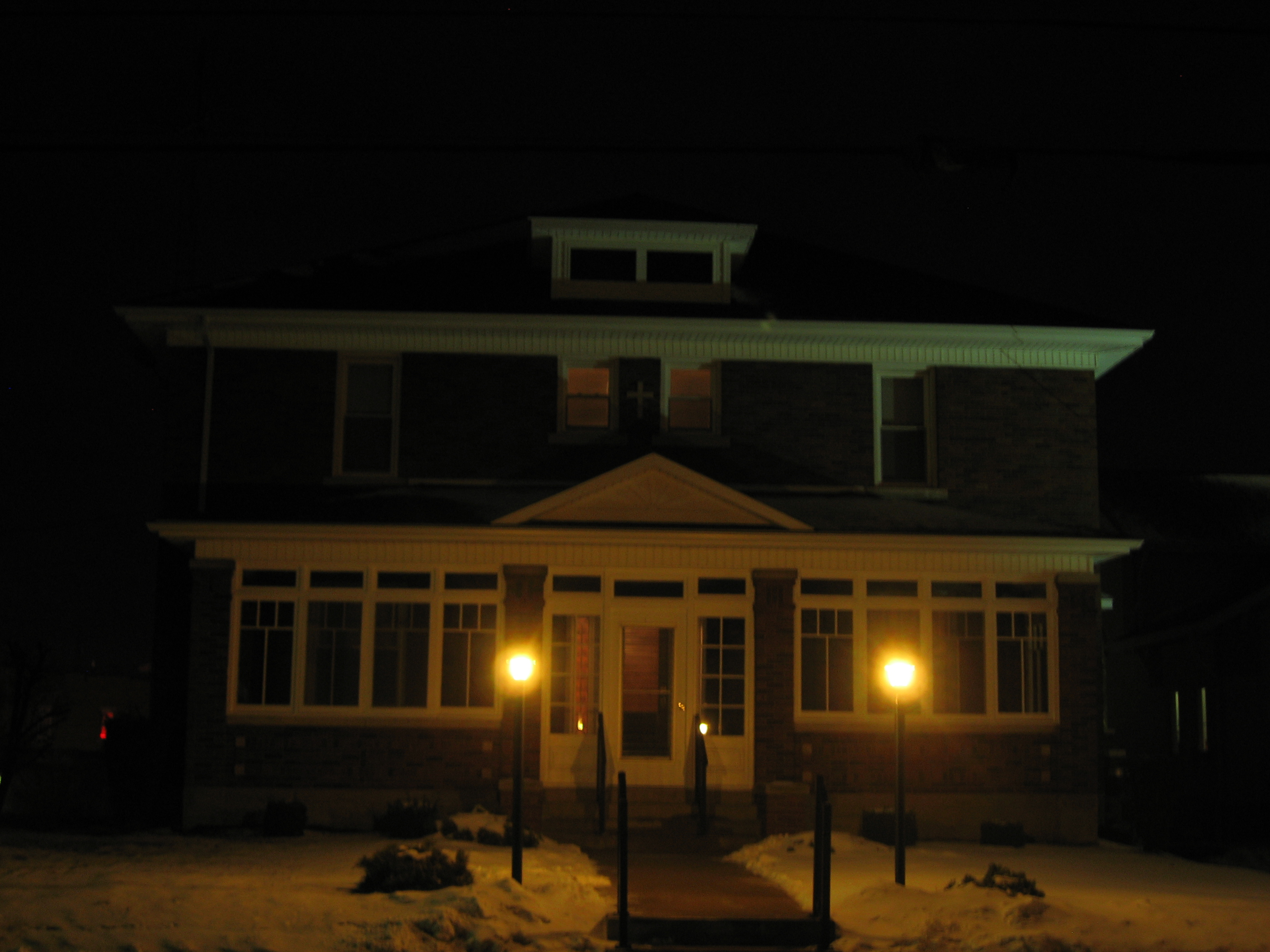
The rectory at night

Adjacent to the church on the west is a brick rectory; built in 1914, it replaced a small wooden rectory that has since been moved to a different part of the village. Constructed in a vernacular style, it is a square two-story structure with an ashlar foundation and an enclosed front porch. A hip roof of asbestos shingle, pierced by multiple dormers, covers the building. Among its most striking features is a stone cross, located between the second-story windows on the front of the house.

== Recent history ==
In 1977, the church and rectory were recorded by an architectural survey, the Ohio Historic Inventory; it assessed both buildings as being in good condition without any threats to their integrity. Two years later, the buildings were listed together on the National Register of Historic Places because of their architectural significance. Twenty-five other churches, including two others in northeastern Darke County, were listed on the National Register at the same time as part of a multiple property submission of properties in western Ohio related to the Missionaries of the Precious Blood. St. Louis's architecture is highly distinctive from and unique among the other churches of the area. In contrast to the French architecture of St. Louis Church, most of these churches feature tall Gothic Revival towers visible from a significant distance. The massive towers of the Gothic Revival churches are the namesakes for this region of western Ohio, which has been nicknamed the "Land of the Cross-Tipped Churches."

Today, St. Louis Church is an active parish of the Archdiocese of Cincinnati. It is part of the Northwest 5 family of parishes with St. Remy's in Russia, St. Denis in Versailles, Holy Family in Frenchtown, St. Mary's in Greenville and St. Nicholas in Osgood.
