= Holy Rosary Catholic Church (St. Marys, Ohio) =

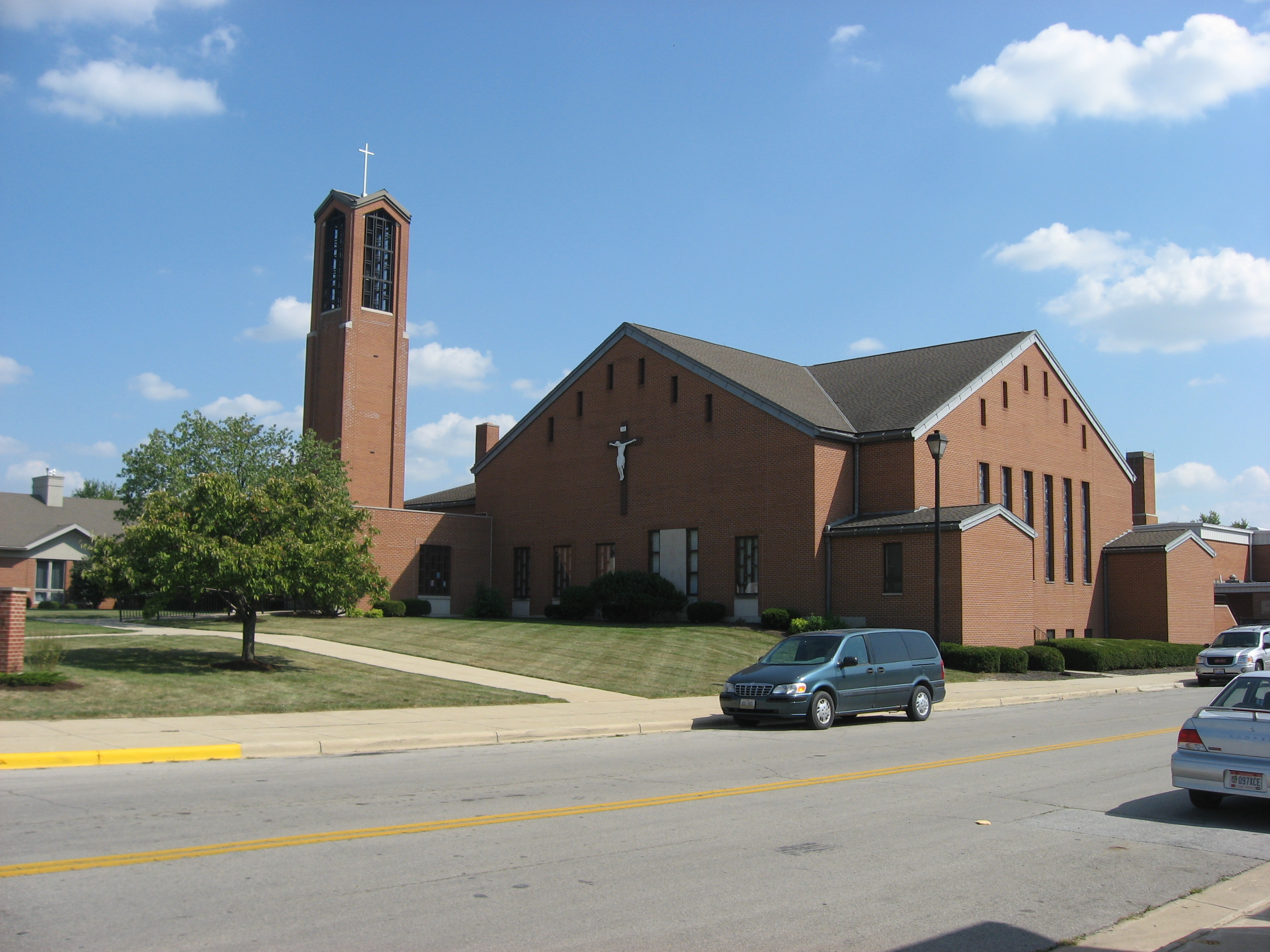
- Front of the present Holy Rosary Church

- Location within Ohio Location within the United States
- 40°32′42″N 84°22′58″W
- Location: Junction of E. Spring and S. Pine Sts. in St. Marys, Ohio
- Country: United States
- Denomination: Roman Catholic
- Website: www.holyrosarychurch.us

History
- Founded: 1852

Administration
- Archdiocese: Archdiocese of Cincinnati
- Deanery: St. Marys Deanery

Clergy
- Pastor: Rev. Barry Stechschulte
- Holy Rosary Catholic Church
- U.S. National Register of Historic Places
- Area: Less than 1 acre (0.40 ha)
- Built: 1867
- Demolished: 1978
- MPS: Cross-Tipped Churches of Ohio TR
- NRHP reference No.: 79003456
- Added to NRHP: July 26, 1979

Holy Rosary Catholic Church is a Roman Catholic parish on the east side of St. Marys, Ohio, United States. Established in 1852, the church has been recognized for its historic 1860s church building, which was demolished amid a period of growth in the 1970s and replaced with a modernist structure.

== Establishment ==
St. Marys' first Catholics settled in the community in 1831. Their numbers greatly increased in the 1840s with the construction of the Miami and Erie Canal and of Grand Lake St. Marys. At this time, large numbers of German Catholics were taking up residence in the plains of western Ohio near St. Marys, and priests of the Society of the Precious Blood became established in Minster, about 10 miles (16 km) to the south of St. Marys. For twenty years, the community's Catholics often travelled to Minster for Mass; this situation ended with the erection of Holy Rosary parish in 1852. In its early years, the parish was administered in conjunction with St. Thomas parish in nearby Six Mile, almost 5 miles (8.0 km) to the northeast.

== Growth ==
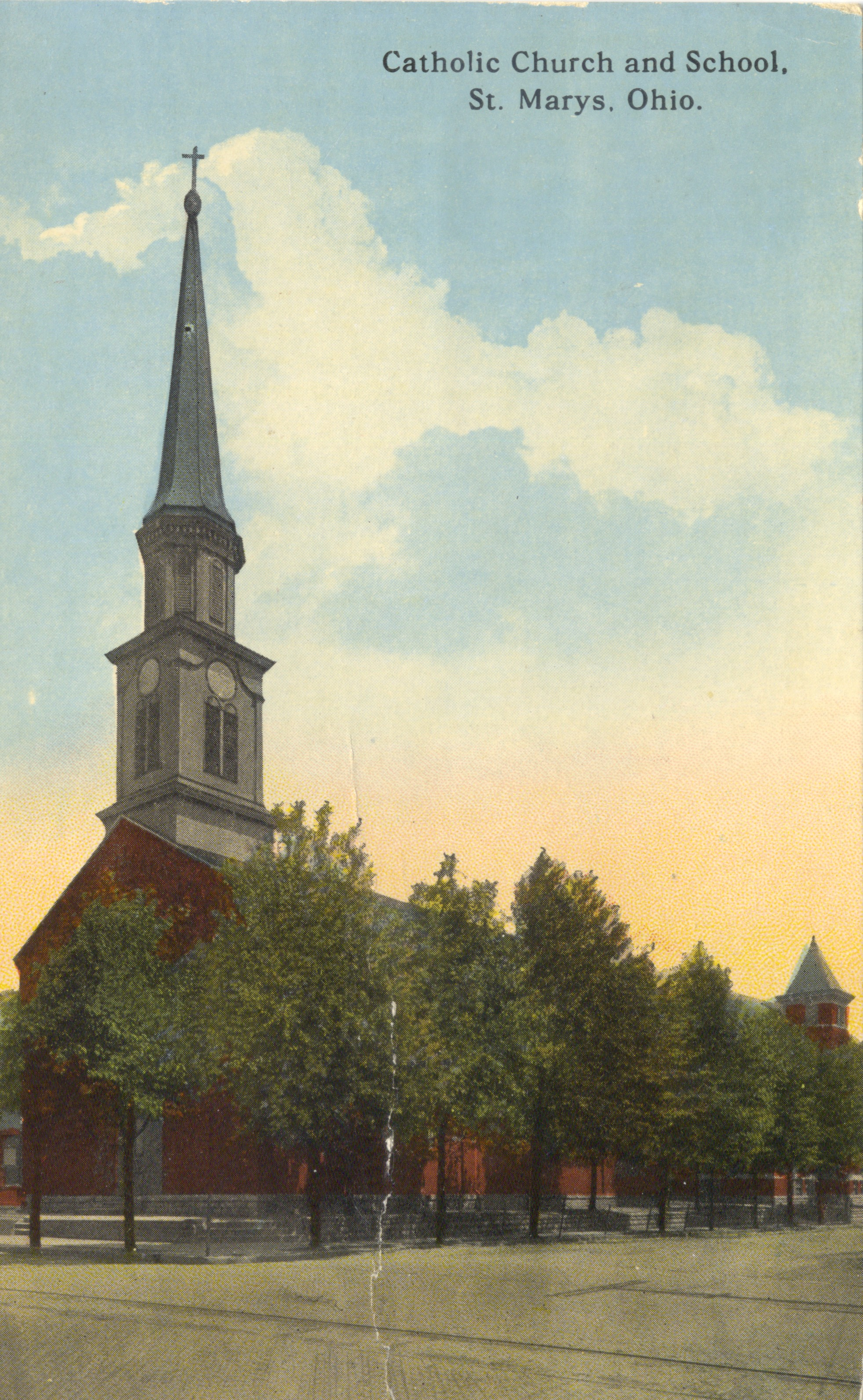
Appearance circa 1910

By 1854, the parishioners built their first church, a log structure, and the parish's property was expanded with the purchase of land for a cemetery and a small rectory in 1861. By this time, growth in membership rendered the church too small for the numbers of worshippers, but the parish was too poor to erect a replacement. Under the leadership of Joseph Gregory Dwenger, the parish received encouragement from Archbishop John Baptist Purcell, and other churches in the Archdiocese of Cincinnati contributed significant amounts of money for construction; the parish finished its new church in 1867 at a cost of $12,000. Designed by Minster architect Anton Goehr, the new church was a simple rectangular brick structure with a bell tower, supported by a stone foundation. The original church was moved to the banks of the canal in downtown St. Marys.

As the parish continued to grow into the 1880s, a bell was added to the church's steeple, and a rectory was built at a cost of nearly $3,000. Non-Catholics in the community paid nearly half of the cost of erecting the rectory. Increased wealth among the parishioners and growing anti-Catholic sentiment in the region resulted in the foundation of a parish school in 1902.

== New facilities ==
By the 1940s, the church had deteriorated significantly to the point that an extensive remodeling effort was necessary. Increased membership in the 1950s overcrowded the school building; a new school was built in its place in time for the 1957 schoolyear. By the late 1960s, this growth made the century-old church too small for its parish, and efforts to erect a new church began in 1969. With surveys revealing that nearly three in four parishioners wanted a new building, the original church was demolished in 1978; its replacement was finished in the following year. Some features of the original church, such as its organ and some of its windows, were preserved and included in the new construction.

== Recognition ==
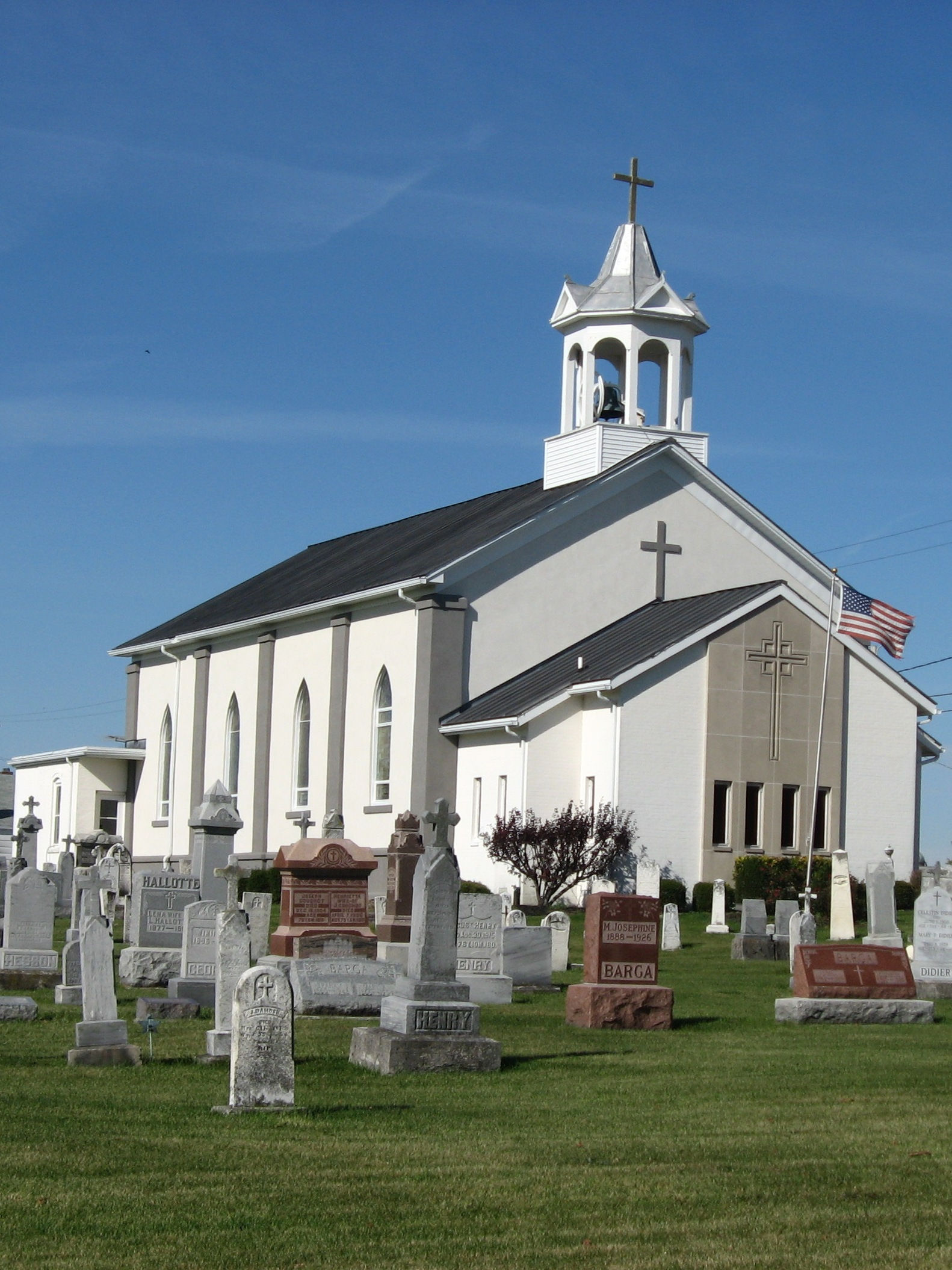
The 1867 church resembled the still-standing Holy Family Church in Frenchtown, Ohio

One year after its demolition, the church was listed on the National Register of Historic Places for its architectural significance, along with nearly thirty other Catholic churches in the region of far western Ohio known as the "Land of the Cross-Tipped Churches." Although more than thirty years have passed since the second building's destruction, it remains listed on the National Register.

Since settlement in the middle of the 19th century, the Catholic Church has been a leading part of life in this region of the state, with its massive Gothic Revival churches in tiny farming communities among wide plains. When Holy Rosary Church was first proposed for addition to the National Register in 1977, it was identified as one of the region's most significant Catholic churches built during the third quarter of the 19th century. Eight churches in the region were built during this period as simple rectangular brick structures with small bell towers, but only Holy Rosary and Holy Family Church in Frenchtown to the south retained their original appearance; the other six churches were modified by the addition of tall spires. Few churches in the region built before this time are yet in existence; only St. John's Catholic Church in Fryburg to the east has not been significantly changed, while Holy Rosary's first building, since converted to a canal-side house, is one of the few that have survived in any condition.

Holy Rosary remains an active parish of the Archdiocese of Cincinnati. It is clustered with St. Patrick parish in Glynwood (the former St. Thomas parish), and both churches are a part of the St. Marys Deanery.
