= St. Patrick's Catholic Church (Glynwood, Ohio) =

- Glynnwood Catholic Church
- U.S. National Register of Historic Places
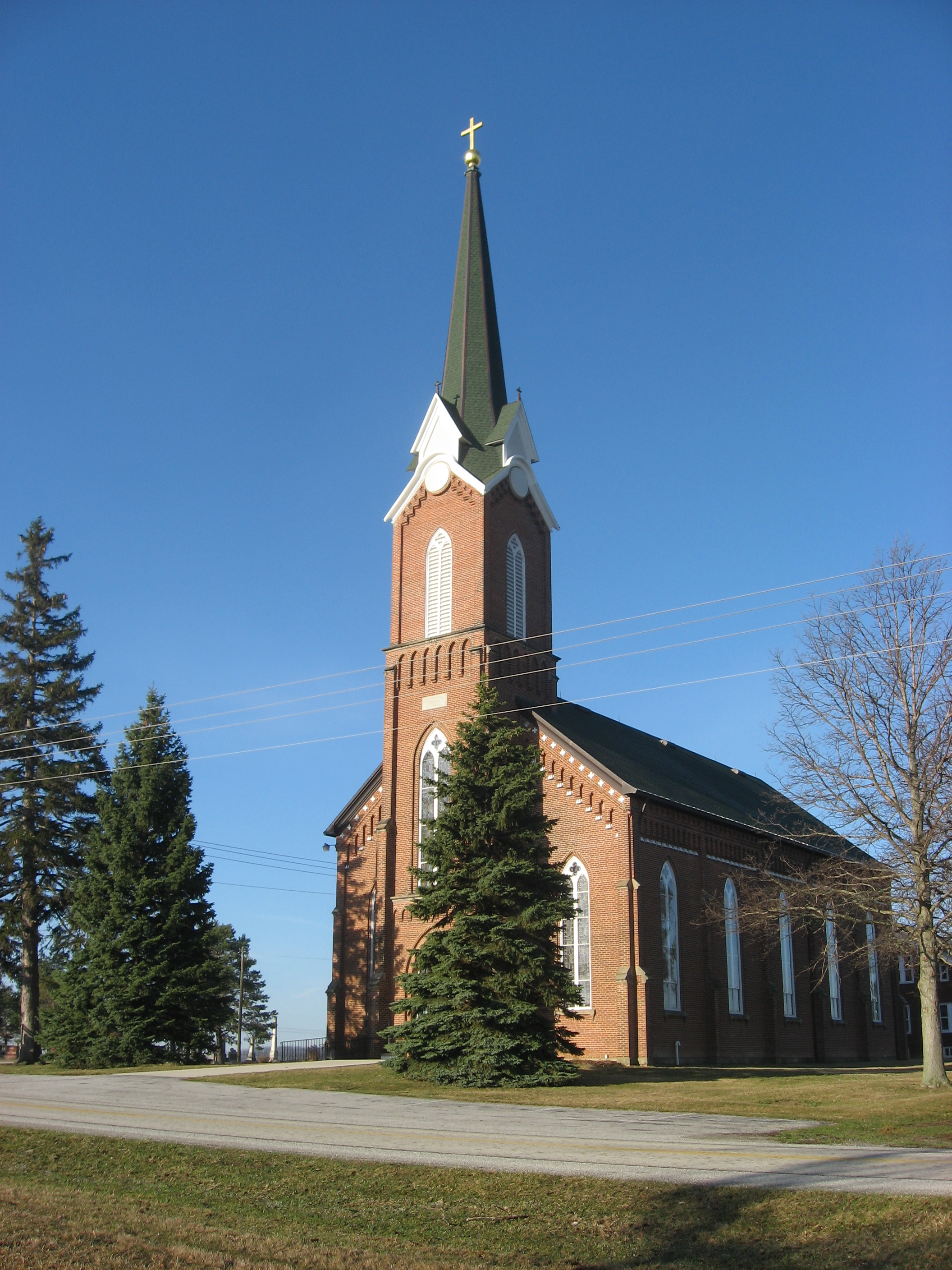
- Front of St. Patrick's Church

- Location within Ohio Location within the United States
- Location: 6 miles northeast of St. Marys on Glynwood Rd., Glynwood, Ohio
- Coordinates: 40°34′59″N 84°19′5″W
- Area: 1 acre (0.40 ha)
- Built: 1883
- Architectural style: Gothic Revival
- MPS: Cross-Tipped Churches of Ohio TR
- NRHP reference No.: 79003454
- Added to NRHP: July 26, 1979

St. Patrick's Church is a historic Roman Catholic church in Glynwood, an unincorporated community in Moulton Township, Auglaize County, Ohio, United States. Located north of U.S. Route 33 between St. Marys and Wapakoneta, the church was built in 1883 in the Gothic Revival style. It is one of many large Catholic churches in a region of rural western Ohio known as the "Land of the Cross-Tipped Churches," which was settled by primarily Catholic immigrants during the nineteenth century.

== Establishment ==
The parish was founded as St. Thomas' Church in the community of Six Mile in 1857. While most Catholic churches established in Auglaize and Mercer counties during this time were primarily German, St. Thomas' was established by Irish settlers. Mass was celebrated in private homes until a leading member donated land for a cemetery and church, which was built in 1860. Starting in the 1840s, the church was served by priests of the Society of the Precious Blood who were based at Minster, approximately 15 miles (24 km) to the south.

== Expansion ==
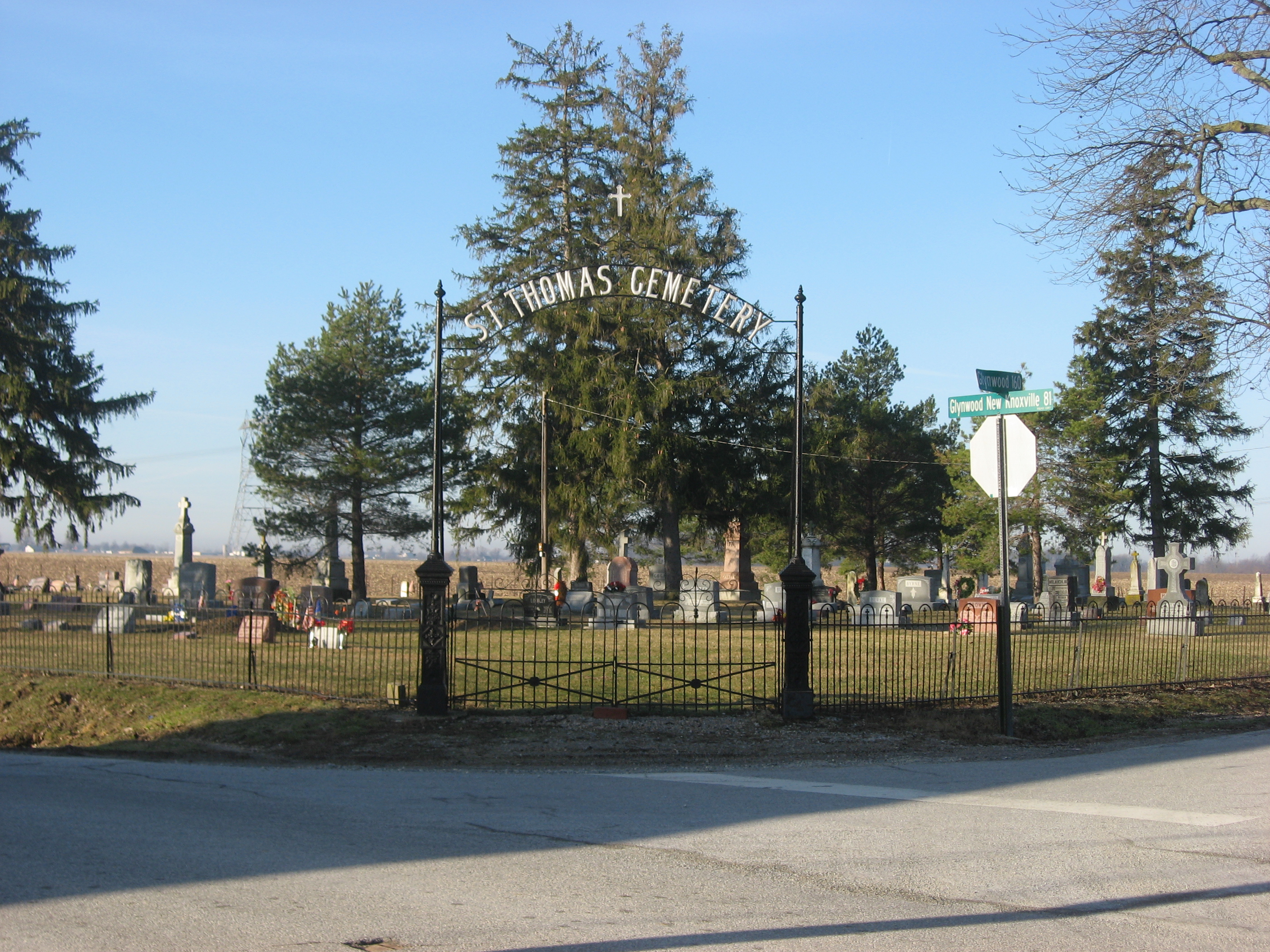
St. Thomas Cemetery

During the 1870s, Six Mile prospered due to the discovery of oil and natural gas in the region and the coming of the Lake Erie and Western Railroad; when the railroad built a depot in Six Mile, it renamed the community for local resident John Glynn. St. Thomas' Church also grew, reaching the point that the old frame church was becoming too small for the number of parishioners. Accordingly, the cornerstone was laid for a new brick church in 1883. In this same year, the parish was rededicated for Saint Patrick, the patron saint of Ireland; the cemetery retained its former name.

Architectural historians have divided the Precious Blood-related churches of western Ohio into multiple generations. Only a few buildings remain from the first generation, which consisted primarily of small wooden churches, and only St. John's Church in Fryburg to the east remains essentially unchanged. Replacing these wooden buildings were the churches of the second generation, which were generally small brick buildings without tall spires. St. Patrick's occupies of a transitional place between the churches of the second and third generations; although it is a small brick building that replaced an early wooden church, its tower resembles those of the High Gothic Revival churches of the third generation.

== Recent history ==
In 1979, St. Patrick's Church was recognized for its architecture by being added to the National Register of Historic Places. Twenty-seven other churches, including the old mother church in Minster, were added to the Register at the same time.

Today, St. Patrick's remains an active parish of the Archdiocese of Cincinnati. It is clustered with Holy Rosary parish in St. Marys, and both churches are a part of the St. Marys Deanery.
