= Craig Stammen =

American baseball player and manager (born 1984)

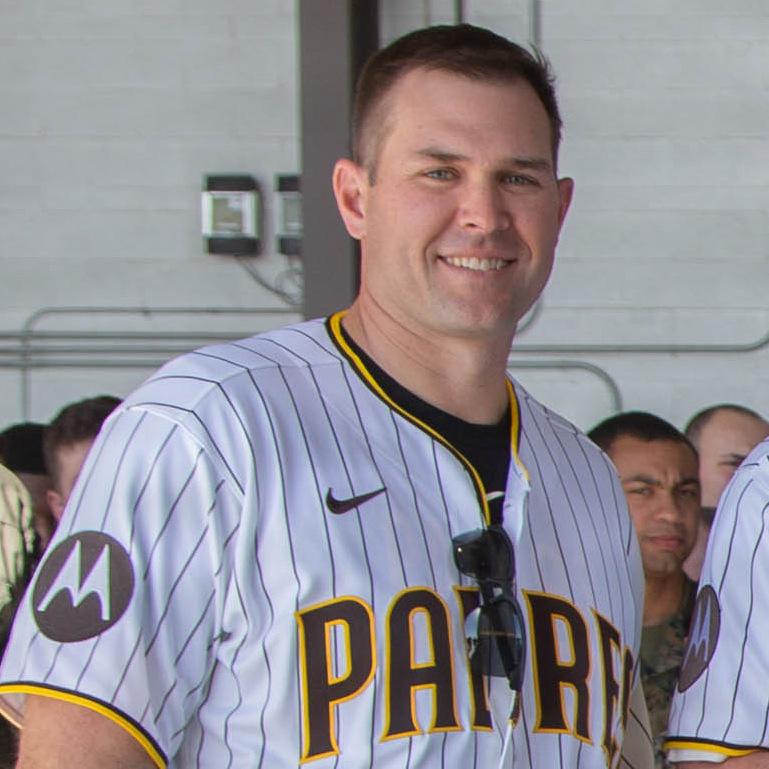
- Stammen with the San Diego Padres in 2026

San Diego Padres – No. 14
- Pitcher / Manager
- Born: March 9, 1984 (age 42); North Star, Ohio, U.S.
- Batted: Right Threw: Right

MLB debut
- May 21, 2009, for the Washington Nationals

Last MLB appearance
- October 5, 2022, for the San Diego Padres

MLB statistics (through 2026 season)
- Win–loss record: 55–44
- Earned run average: 3.66
- Strikeouts: 743
- Managerial record: 91–71
- Winning %: .562
- Stats at Baseball Reference
- Managerial record at Baseball Reference

Teams
- As player: Washington Nationals (2009–2015); San Diego Padres (2017–2022); As manager: San Diego Padres (2026–present)

Craig Nicholas Stammen (born March 9, 1984) is an American professional baseball manager and former pitcher who is the manager of the San Diego Padres of Major League Baseball (MLB). He played in MLB for the Washington Nationals and the Padres.

== Amateur career ==
Stammen started playing baseball in North Star Little League, where he played with fellow future MLB pitcher Cory Luebke. Stammen graduated from Versailles High School where he played football, basketball, and baseball. He was named to the all-Miami Valley baseball team and was awarded Academic All-Ohio honors in 2001.

Stammen attended the University of Dayton, where he played college baseball for the Dayton Flyers and majored in entrepreneurship and business management. For the Flyers, he had 81 pitching appearances over three seasons, as well as pitching for the Lima Locos in the Great Lakes Summer Collegiate League in 2003-2004 (along with a single game for the Grand Lake Mariners in 2005, before he was drafted by the Washington Nationals). He was an Atlantic 10 Conference Academic All-Conference Pick in 2005. While at Dayton, Stammen was teammates with fellow pitcher and future Nationals teammate Jerry Blevins.

== Professional career ==
=== Washington Nationals ===
The Washington Nationals selected Stammen in the 12th round of the 2005 Major League Baseball draft and assigned him to the Vermont Expos of the short-season Single-A New York–Penn League. He made seven starts and six relief appearances, accruing an earned run average (ERA) of 4.06 while striking out 32 batters and allowing 12 walks and 62 hits over 51 innings.

In 2006, Stammen pitched for the Savannah Sand Gnats of the Low-A South Atlantic League and for the Potomac Nationals of the High-A Carolina League. In 143 innings, he had a 4.03 ERA and struck out 109 batters while allowing 36 walks and 144 hits. Most of Stammen's 2007 season was spent at Potomac, although he did make one appearance with the Columbus Clippers of the Triple-A International League. He pitched 128 2/3 innings, striking out 98 batters and yielding 57 walks and 160 hits on the way to a 4.41 ERA.

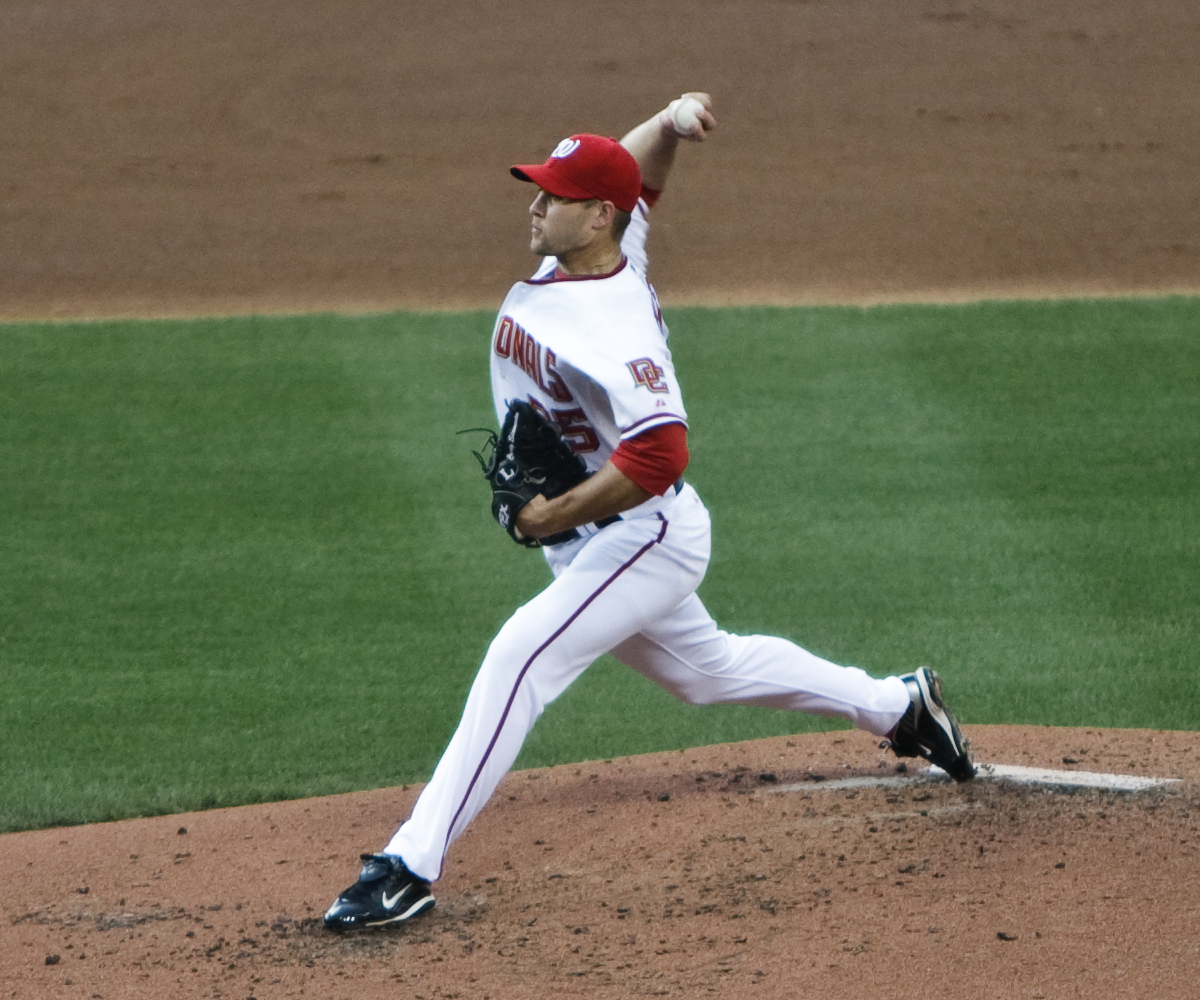
Stammen with the Washington Nationals

Stammen's duties in 2008 were divided among Potomac, the Harrisburg Senators of the Double-A Eastern League, and Columbus. He posted an ERA of 3.52 over 150 2/3 innings, striking out 128 batters while giving up 44 walks and 143 hits. He was a member of the Carolina League Mid-Season All-Star team. On July 14 he was named Eastern League Pitcher of the Week.

Stammen started off the 2009 season with the Triple-A Syracuse Chiefs, going 4–2 with a 1.80 ERA (through 20 May 2009). He was called up to the major leagues on May 20, 2009. He had his first major league start May 21 versus the Pittsburgh Pirates and pitched 6 1/3 innings with no decision. His first major league win was June 18 versus the New York Yankees. Stammen pitched 6 1/3 innings and allowed no runs. On July 11, 2009, he pitched his first major league complete game against the Houston Astros, allowing only 2 runs on 9 hits.

Stammen continued to pitch in the starting rotation, going 4–7 with a 5.11 ERA in 19 starts, until the beginning of September when he was scratched from his scheduled September 4 start because of a sore elbow. An MRI on September 3 revealed a bone spur in the back of his right (pitching) elbow. Arthroscopic surgery was performed on September 6 and Stammen recovered in time for spring training in 2010.

After recovering from a season-ending arthroscopic surgery in September 2009 and having a successful spring training, Stammen returned to the Nationals' rotation as their third starter for the 2010 season.

On June 7, Stammen was optioned to the Triple-A Syracuse Chiefs to make room on the active roster for starting pitcher Stephen Strasburg, the first overall draft pick in the 2009 Major League Baseball draft. On June 29, after going 2–0 with a 2.25 ERA in three starts for the Chiefs (the last of which he came within one out of throwing a seven-inning no-hitter, Stammen was recalled to the Nationals and returned to the starting rotation. The following night he pitched 7 1/3 innings, allowing two runs on five hits, against the first place Atlanta Braves, stopping a Nats' 5-game losing streak in a 7–2 win. On August 8, Stammen was moved to the bullpen to make room in the starting rotation for Strasburg and Jason Marquis.

After spending spring training with the Nationals, Stammen was optioned to Triple-A Syracuse for the start of the 2011 season (though remaining on the Nationals' 40-man roster). Stammen rejoined the Nationals from June 4–14 while Doug Slaten was on the 15-day disabled list. During this brief stint, Stammen pitched 2 innings of relief in two games, picking up one loss. After spending most of the summer with Syracuse, Stammen was called up again on September 6.

Stammen made the Nationals' 2012 opening day roster, serving as a long reliever. Stammen recorded his first career save on September 29, in a 10-inning victory against the St. Louis Cardinals.

On May 31, 2013, Stammen came in after Stephen Strasburg left with an apparent injury after the second inning. Stammen pitched four innings of perfect baseball: no hits, no runs, no walks, with three strikeouts for the win against division-leading Atlanta Braves.

On December 3, 2015, Stammen was non-tendered by the Nationals.

=== Cleveland Indians ===
On February 8, 2016, Stammen signed a minor league contract with the Cleveland Indians. He split the season between the rookie-level Arizona League Indians, Double-A Akron RubberDucks, and Triple-A Columbus Clippers. In 23 cumulative appearances, Stammen registered a 3.62 ERA with 28 strikeouts in 27 1/3 innings pitched. He elected free agency following the season on November 7.

=== San Diego Padres ===
On December 23, 2016, Stammen signed a minor league contract with the San Diego Padres. On March 30, 2017, Stammen was added to the Padres' 25-man active roster, where he joined the team as a reliever. Stammen pitched 1 inning on April 3, his first major league appearance since April 14, 2015. He was effective throughout the season, posting an ERA of 3.15 in 80 1/3 innings.

On January 7, 2018, Stammen signed a two-year contract with the Padres. In 2018, he was 8–3 in a career high 73 appearances.

On June 9, 2019, facing his former team, the Nationals, he gave up four consecutive home runs to Howie Kendrick, Trea Turner, Adam Eaton, and Anthony Rendon. In 2019, he led the major leagues with 9 blown saves, and tied for the major league lead with 31 holds.

On January 17, 2020, Stammen re-signed with the Padres on a two-year, $9 million contract with a club option for the 2022 season. In the pandemic shortened season, Stammen recorded a 4–2 record and a 5.63 ERA with 20 strikeouts and 4 walks in 24 innings pitched in the same number of games.

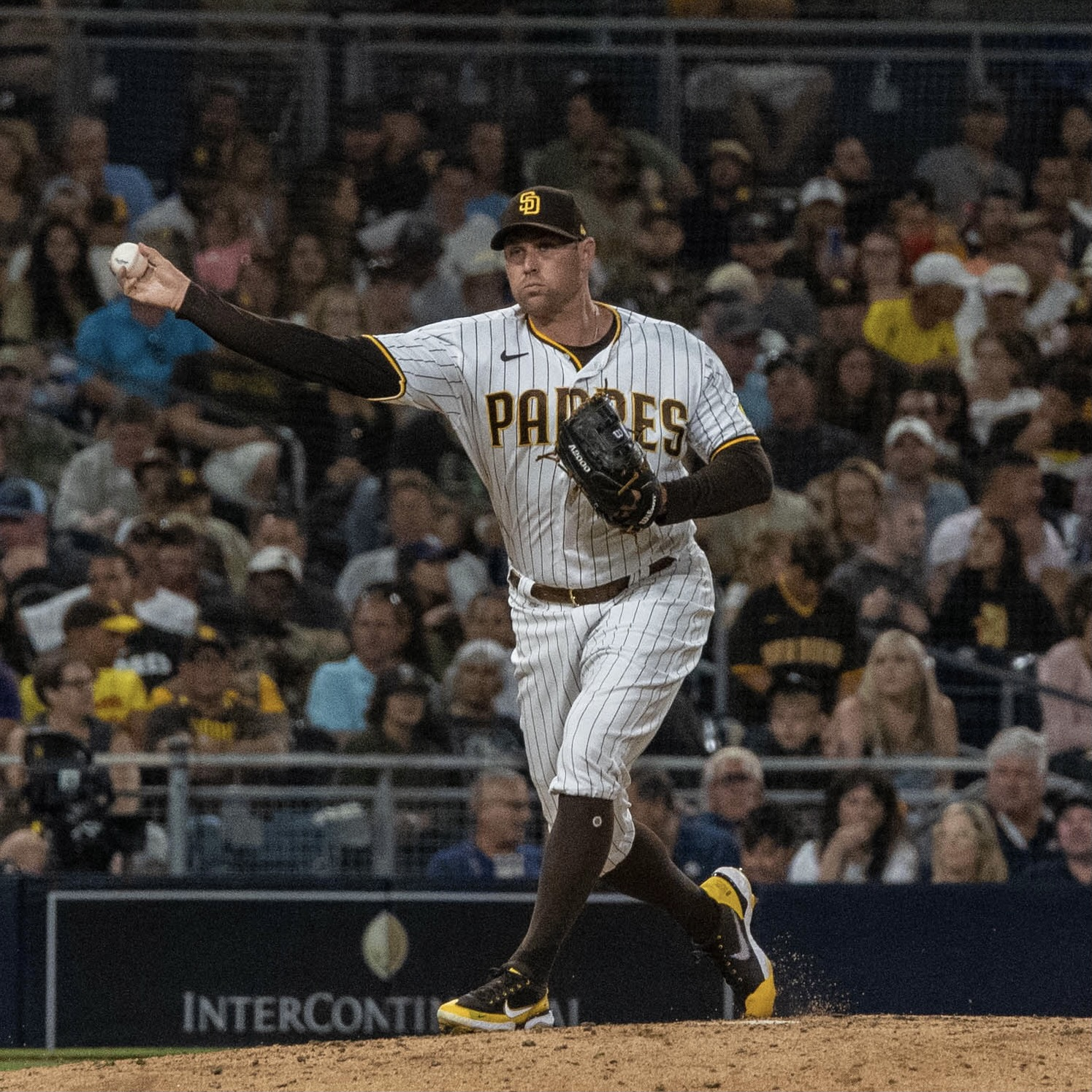
Stammen in 2021

In 2021, Stammen posted a 6–3 record and 3.06 ERA with 83 strikeouts and 13 walks in 88 1/3 innings across 67 appearances. On July 9, 2022, Stammen was placed on the injured list with right shoulder inflammation, and was transferred to the 60- day injured list on August 17. He was activated on September 11. Stammen made 33 appearances for San Diego in 2022, logging a 1-2 record and 4.43 ERA with 35 strikeouts in 40.2 innings pitched.

On January 11, 2023, Stammen re-signed with the Padres on a minor league contract. On March 10, Stammen suffered a torn capsule in his right shoulder and a strained sub scapula, with both injuries being related to the torn rotator cuff he suffered in 2022. The injury caused Stammen to contemplate retirement, as the recovery timetable was set at four-to-six months without surgery. On August 4, Stammen officially announced his retirement from professional baseball.

== Post-playing career ==
On January 30, 2024, Stammen re-joined the San Diego Padres organization as an assistant to the major league coaching staff and baseball operations department.

On November 6, 2025, the Padres announced Stammen as their new manager. He agreed to a three-year contract and began his managerial tenure with the 2026 season. He became MLB's only current manager who is a former pitcher. In his first year as a manager, Stammen led the Padres to a 91-71 regular season record. The Padres would sweep the Chicago Cubs 2-0 in the Wild Card, but fall 3-1 to the Milwaukee Brewers in the NLDS.

== Managerial record ==
As of games played on October 7, 2026

Team	Year	Regular season					Postseason			
Team	Year	Games	Won	Lost	Win %	Finish	Won	Lost	Win %	Result
SD	2026	162	91	71	.562	2nd in NL West	3	3	.500	Lost NLDS (MIL)
Total		162	91	71	.562		3	3	.500	

== Pitching style ==
Stammen was a sinkerballer. He threw his sinker in the 90–93 mph range and used it especially frequently against left-handed hitters. Against right-handed batters, Stammen paired his sinker with a slider in the mid 80s. The sinker was useful in inducing ground balls, while the slider was a good option for getting strikeouts: it has a whiff rate of 44% for his career and is the pitch most responsible for his career strikeouts. Additionally, he used his curveball frequently in two-strike counts, especially against left-handers. He also threw a four-seam fastball.

== Personal life ==
Stammen grew up and still resides in North Star, Ohio, a village about 11 miles (18 km) northwest of Versailles. Stammen's parents are Jeff and Connie.

Stammen is a devout Roman Catholic.

In 2012, Stammen took his first trip to Afghanistan to visit military personnel. Stammen's work with the United States Military is partially due to some of his college friends joining the Army and Marines. His continued to support the military throughout his playing career. In recognition of his efforts, he was the recipient of the Bob Feller Act of Valor Award, in 2020.

Stammen and Audrey Ludwig, an assistant volleyball coach for the University of Dayton, were introduced to each other by Tony Vittorio, Stammen's former college coach. Craig and Audrey were married on January 21, 2017, at Holy Angels Catholic Church in Dayton, Ohio. The newlyweds honeymooned in Hawaii where Audrey hit a hole-in-one on the final day of their stay. Their first child, a son named Chase, was born in 2018. Their second child, a daughter named Summit, was born in 2019. A second son named Ty followed in 2021, and a second daughter named Cece was born in 2023.

Stammen co-owns Orion Sports Medicine in Miamisburg, Ohio with fellow former Dayton Flyers and professional athletes Mike Hauschild and Chris Wright.
