= North Star, Ohio =

- Village
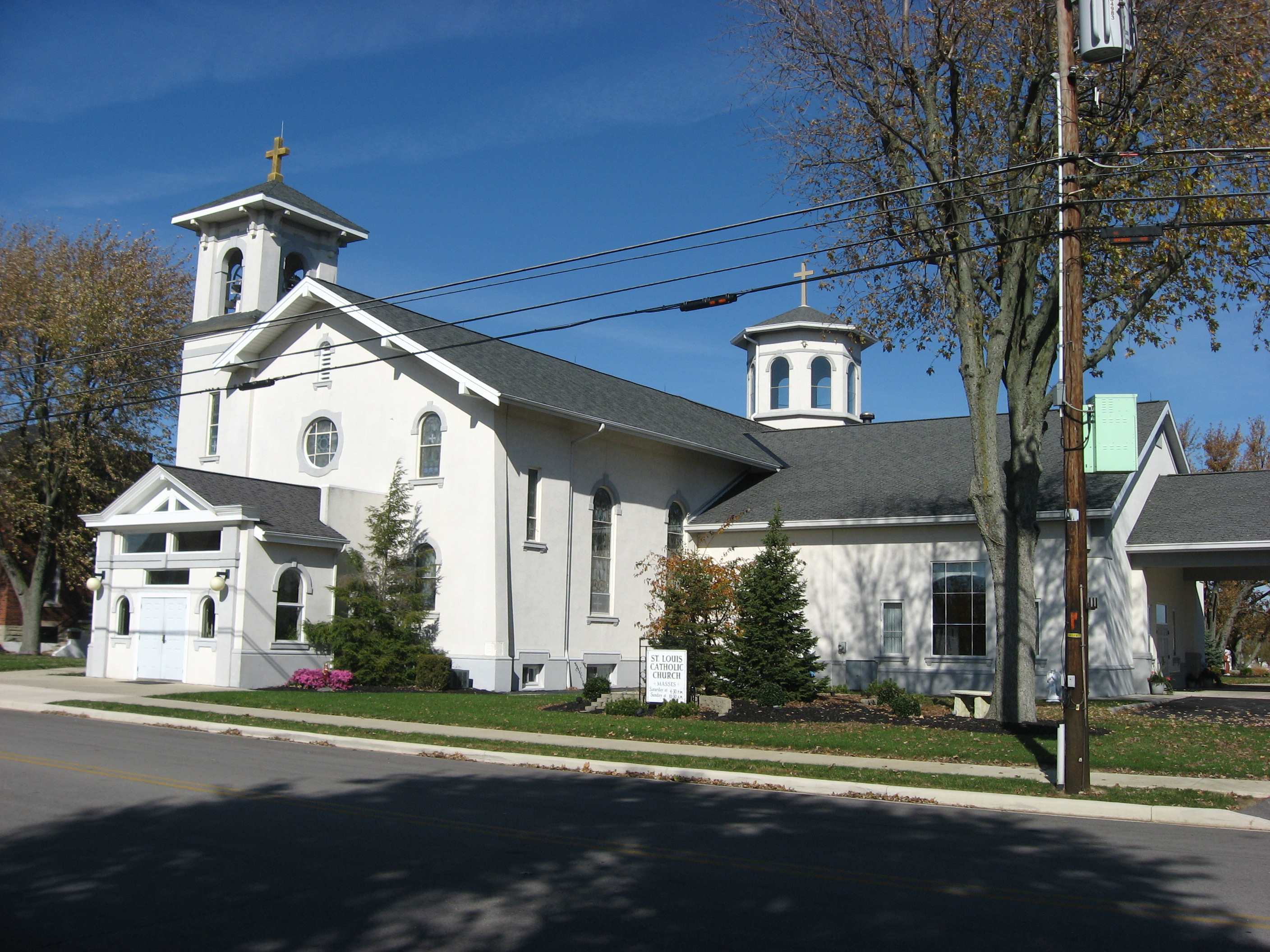
- St. Louis Catholic Church, a community landmark

- Location in Darke County and the state of Ohio.
- Coordinates: 40°19′28″N 84°34′08″W
- Country: United States
- State: Ohio
- County: Darke
- Township: Wabash

Area
  - Total: 0.51 sq mi (1.33 km^{2})
  - Land: 0.51 sq mi (1.33 km^{2})
  - Water: 0 sq mi (0.00 km^{2})
- Elevation: 1,001 ft (305 m)

Population (2020)
  - Total: 224
  - Density: 437.6/sq mi (168.94/km^{2})
- Time zone: UTC-5 (Eastern (EST))
  - Summer (DST): UTC-4 (EDT)
- ZIP code: 45350
- Area code: 419
- FIPS code: 39-57064
- GNIS feature ID: 2399523

North Star is a village in Darke County, Ohio, United States. The population was 224 at the 2020 census.

== History ==
North Star was platted in 1852 along the road between Greenville and Celina, approximately midway between the two cities. Its name was derived from its location on the edge of the Great Black Swamp, as it was the northernmost point in Darke County that was not wetland.

A historic site in the village is St. Louis' Catholic Church. Built in 1914, it is listed on the National Register of Historic Places.

== Geography ==
According to the United States Census Bureau, the village has a total area of 0.53 square miles (1.37 km^{2}), all land.

== Demographics ==
Historical population
Census	Pop.	Note	%±
1950	166		—
1960	169		1.8%
1970	296		75.1%
1980	254		−14.2%
1990	246		−3.1%
2000	209		−15.0%
2010	236		12.9%
2020	224		−5.1%
U.S. Decennial Census

=== 2010 census ===
As of the census of 2010, there were 236 people, 88 households, and 59 families living in the village. The population density was 445.3 inhabitants per square mile (171.9/km^{2}). There were 91 housing units at an average density of 171.7 per square mile (66.3/km^{2}). The racial makeup of the village was 100.0% White.

There were 88 households, of which 29.5% had children under the age of 18 living with them, 55.7% were married couples living together, 5.7% had a female householder with no husband present, 5.7% had a male householder with no wife present, and 33.0% were non-families. 28.4% of all households were made up of individuals, and 11.4% had someone living alone who was 65 years of age or older. The average household size was 2.68 and the average family size was 3.36.

The median age in the village was 37 years. 30.1% of residents were under the age of 18; 5.1% were between the ages of 18 and 24; 23.8% were from 25 to 44; 18.7% were from 45 to 64; and 22.5% were 65 years of age or older. The gender makeup of the village was 47.5% male and 52.5% female.

=== 2000 census ===
As of the census of 2000, there were 209 people, 77 households, and 56 families living in the village. The population density was 401.4 inhabitants per square mile (155.0/km^{2}). There were 80 housing units at an average density of 153.7 per square mile (59.3/km^{2}). The racial makeup of the village was 99.52% White and 0.48% Asian.

There were 77 households, out of which 29.9% had children under the age of 18 living with them, 70.1% were married couples living together, 1.3% had a female householder with no husband present, and 26.0% were non-families. 24.7% of all households were made up of individuals, and 14.3% had someone living alone who was 65 years of age or older. The average household size was 2.71 and the average family size was 3.28.

In the village, the population was spread out, with 28.7% under the age of 18, 4.8% from 18 to 24, 24.9% from 25 to 44, 20.6% from 45 to 64, and 21.1% who were 65 years of age or older. The median age was 39 years. For every 100 females, there were 104.9 males. For every 100 females age 18 and over, there were 98.7 males.

The median income for a household in the village was $50,938, and the median income for a family was $57,188. Males had a median income of $35,714 versus $21,719 for females. The per capita income for the village was $17,917. None of the families and 5.4% of the population were living below the poverty line, including no under eighteens and 28.1% of those over 64.

== Notable people ==
- Annie Oakley - Entertainer, Sharpshooter
- Craig Stammen - Major League Baseball pitcher; manager for the San Diego Padres starting with the 2026 season
