= Glynwood, Ohio =

Unincorporated community in Ohio, U.S.

Coordinates: 40°34′58″N 84°18′58″W

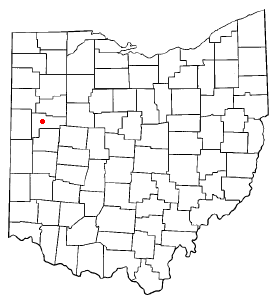
- Interactive map of Glynwood, Ohio

Population
  - Total: 12,791
- Time zone: UTC-5 (Eastern Time Zone)
- Postal code: 45885

Glynwood is an unincorporated community located in southwestern Moulton Township, in Auglaize County, Ohio, United States.

== Location ==
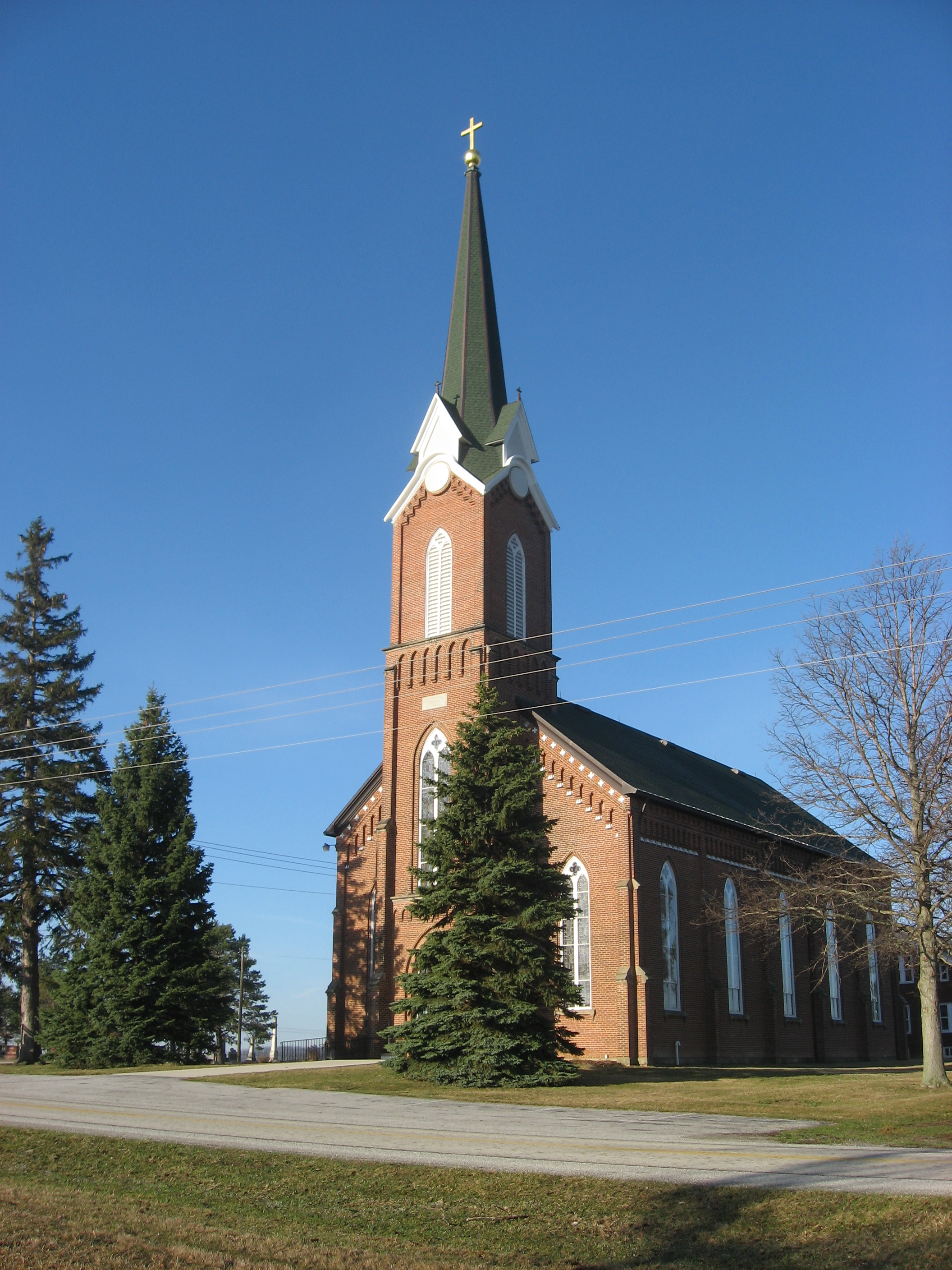
St. Patrick's Church

The community is located between Wapakoneta and Saint Marys. The community is served by the Saint Marys City School District and the Saint Marys (45885) post office.

== Landmarks ==
A community landmark is St. Patrick's Catholic Church, which is listed on the National Register of Historic Places.
