= St. Remy's Catholic Church =

- St. Remy Catholic Church
- U.S. National Register of Historic Places
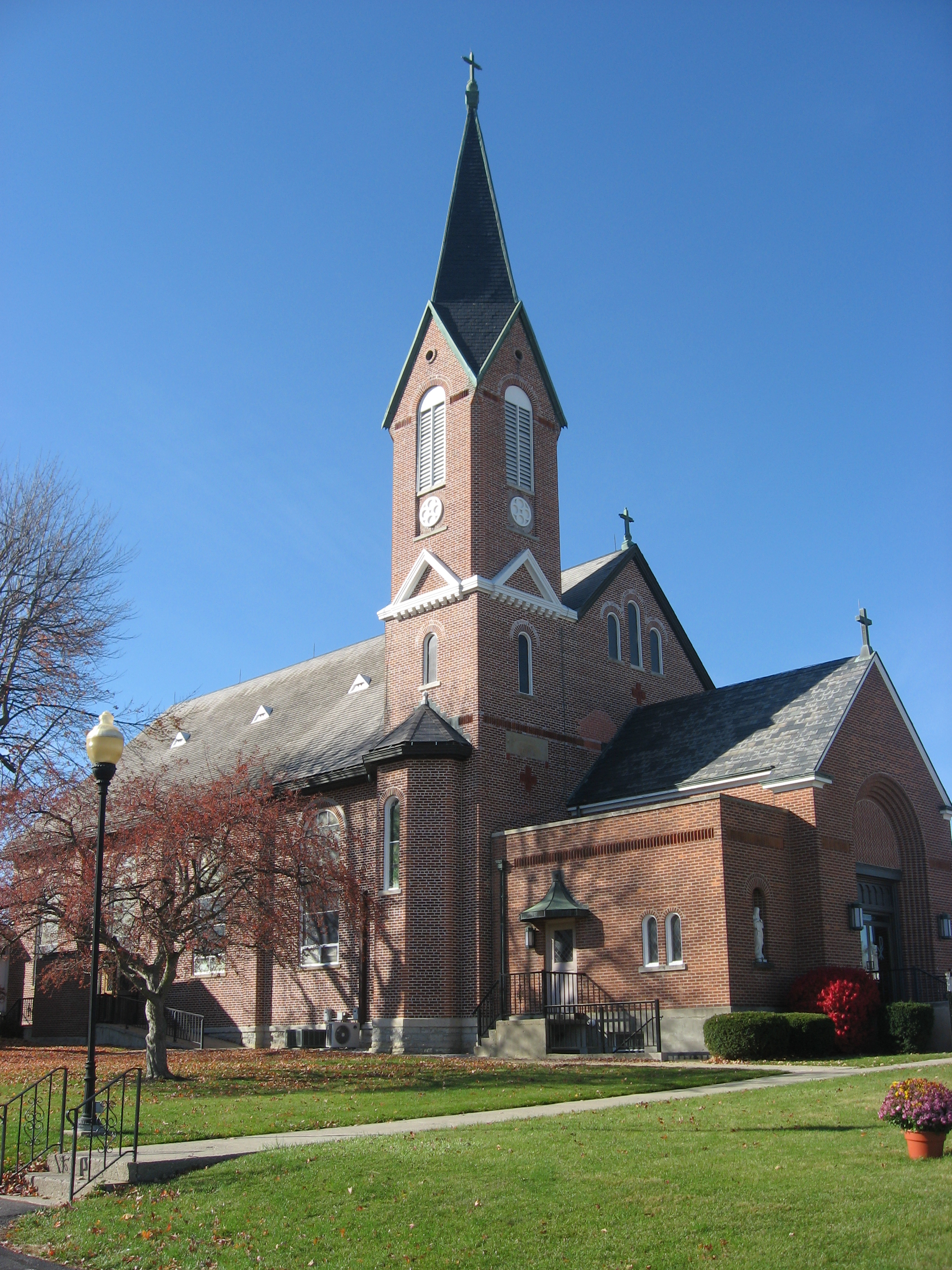
- Front and side of the church

- Location within Ohio Location within the United States
- Location: Main St. and Russia-Versailles Rd.
- Nearest city: Russia, Ohio
- Coordinates: 40°14′1″N 84°24′30″W
- Area: less than one acre
- Built: 1890
- Architectural style: Romanesque Revival
- MPS: Cross-Tipped Churches of Ohio TR
- NRHP reference No.: 79002834
- Added to NRHP: July 26, 1979

St. Remy's Catholic Church is a historic Roman Catholic church in Russia, Ohio, United States. Built in 1890, it continues to house an active parish, and it has been recognized as a historic site because of its architecture.

== Parish history ==
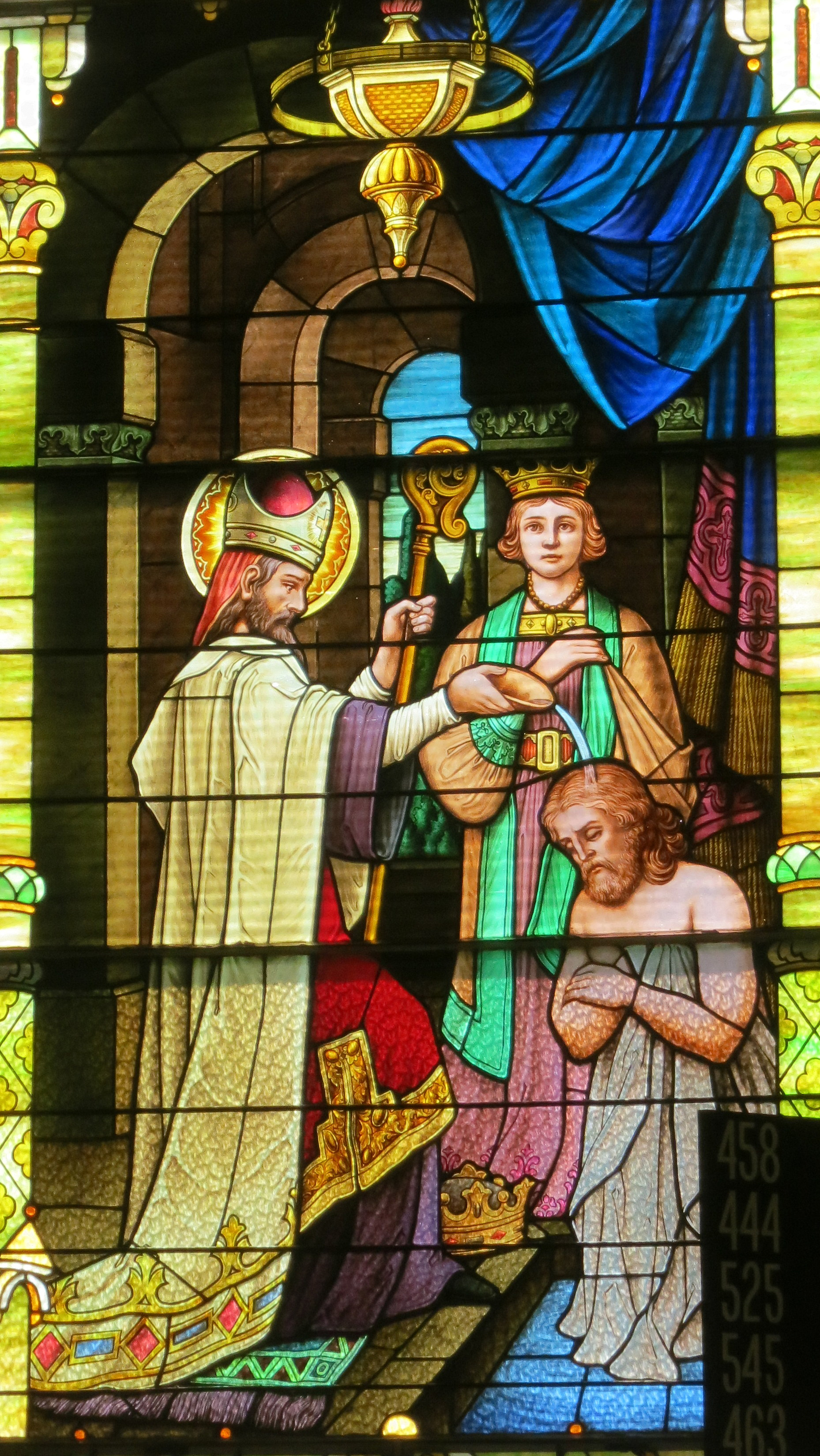
A window from the church depicts Saint Remy baptizing Clovis I.

French-speaking Catholics began to settle in southwestern Shelby County and nearby northeastern Darke County in 1823; in their earliest years, these people were served by an itinerant priest, Father Navarron. In 1839, a parish was created for these settlers and dedicated to St. Valbert; its first building was located 3 miles (4.8 km) northeast of Versailles. When the priests and nuns of the Society of the Precious Blood began to settle in western Ohio in the 1840s, St. Valbert's became a mother church for the Society. The parish was split three ways in 1846: the members to the west of St. Valbert's became part of Holy Family parish, while the members to the southeast became part of St. Remy parish; the remaining members of St. Valbert's erected a new building in the village of Versailles in 1864, at which time it was rededicated to St. Denis.

Russia's first settler built his house in the village in 1853; he was followed by many more settlers by the end of the decade. Many of these early settlers had migrated from the Russian Empire; upon seeing the site for the first time in the winter, they were struck by its resemblance to the Russian steppes and named the village for their former home. The members of St. Remy's constructed a church in the new village in 1854; built of logs, it was dedicated by Archbishop John Baptist Purcell on June 15, 1854. Growth soon necessitated its replacement; the resulting large brick church was built in 1869. As the parishioners continued to multiply, this structure too became insufficient for their numbers, and the third and present structure was erected in 1890.

== Architecture ==
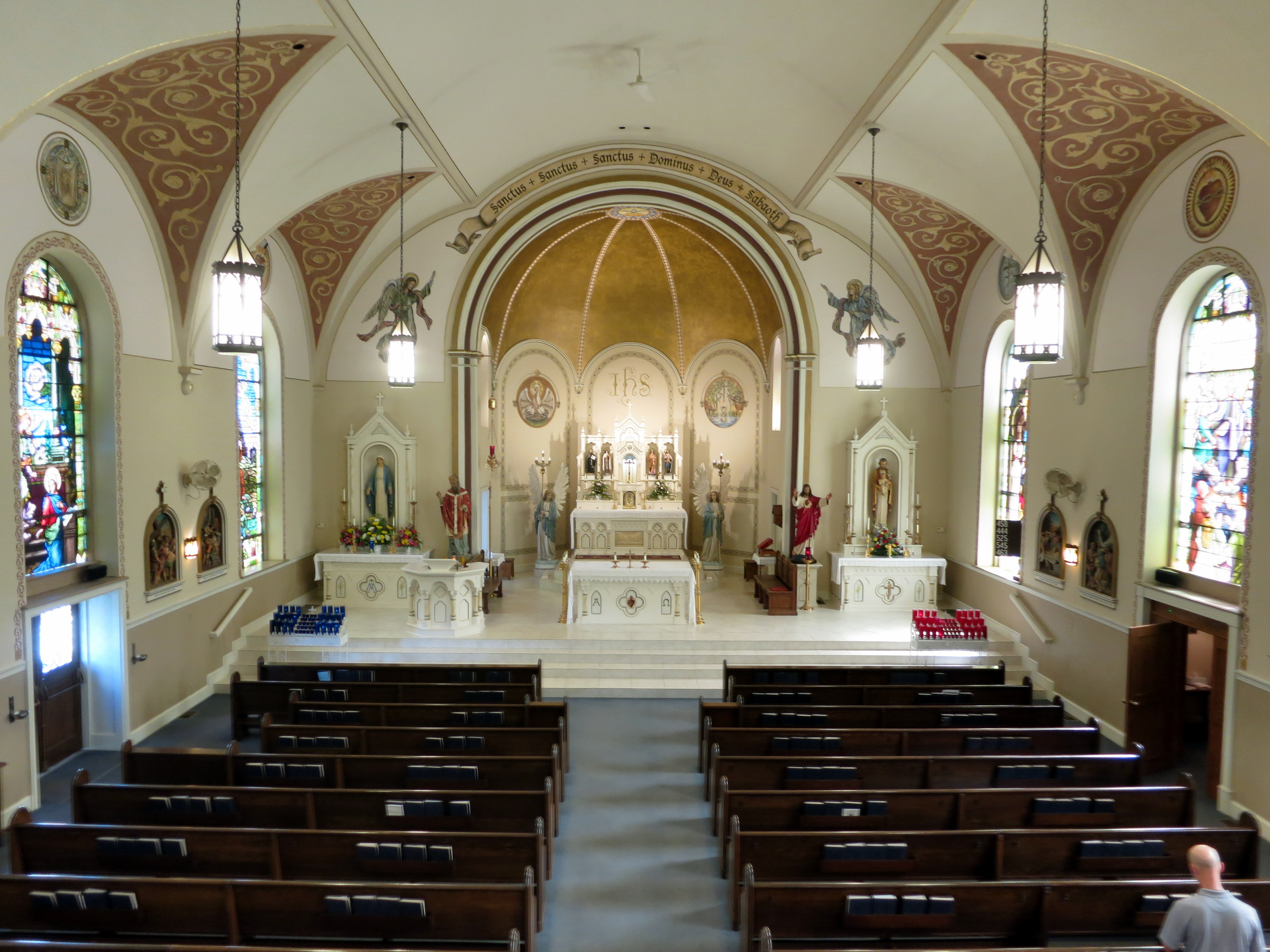
Interior

St. Remy's Church is built primarily in the Romanesque Revival style of architecture, but its tower displays the Gothic Revival style. In the early 20th century, it was rated as one of the most beautiful churches in the Archdiocese of Cincinnati and one of its purest examples of Romanesque Revival architecture. The structure rests on a stone foundation with a basement. Sandblasted brick walls, which rise to multiple gables, are topped with a slate roof. The interior is lit by many stained glass windows along both sides. In 1954 and 1976, the church was extensively modified: a vestibule was added to the front, blocking the original facade, and the original altars and statues were destroyed or heavily changed.

Architectural historians have classified the Precious Blood-related churches of western Ohio into four generations. The churches of the first generation, which were typically small log structures, have largely disappeared; only St. John's Church in Fryburg to the northeast has remained without significant changes. The churches of the second generation are generally small and simple brick structures, most of the churches of the third generation are large Gothic Revival buildings with extensive ornamentation, and the churches of the fourth generation exhibit a wide range of styles, including Italianate and Romanesque Revival. Although it is primarily a Romanesque Revival structure, St. Remy's falls within the period of the third generation, which includes churches built between 1885 and 1905.

== Recent history ==
A 1977 architectural survey ranked the church's exterior in good condition and its interior as being endangered by modifications. In 1979, St. Remy's Church was listed on the National Register of Historic Places because of its architectural significance. Thirty-two other properties, including twenty-five other churches, were listed on the National Register at the same time as part of a multiple property submission of properties in western Ohio related to the Missionaries of the Precious Blood. Among these thirty-two other buildings were two other churches and three other related buildings in western Shelby County. The tall, Gothic Revival towers featured by many of these churches have caused this region of western Ohio to be nicknamed the "Land of the Cross-Tipped Churches."

Today, St. Remy is an active parish of the Archdiocese of Cincinnati.
