= Osgood, Ohio =

- Village
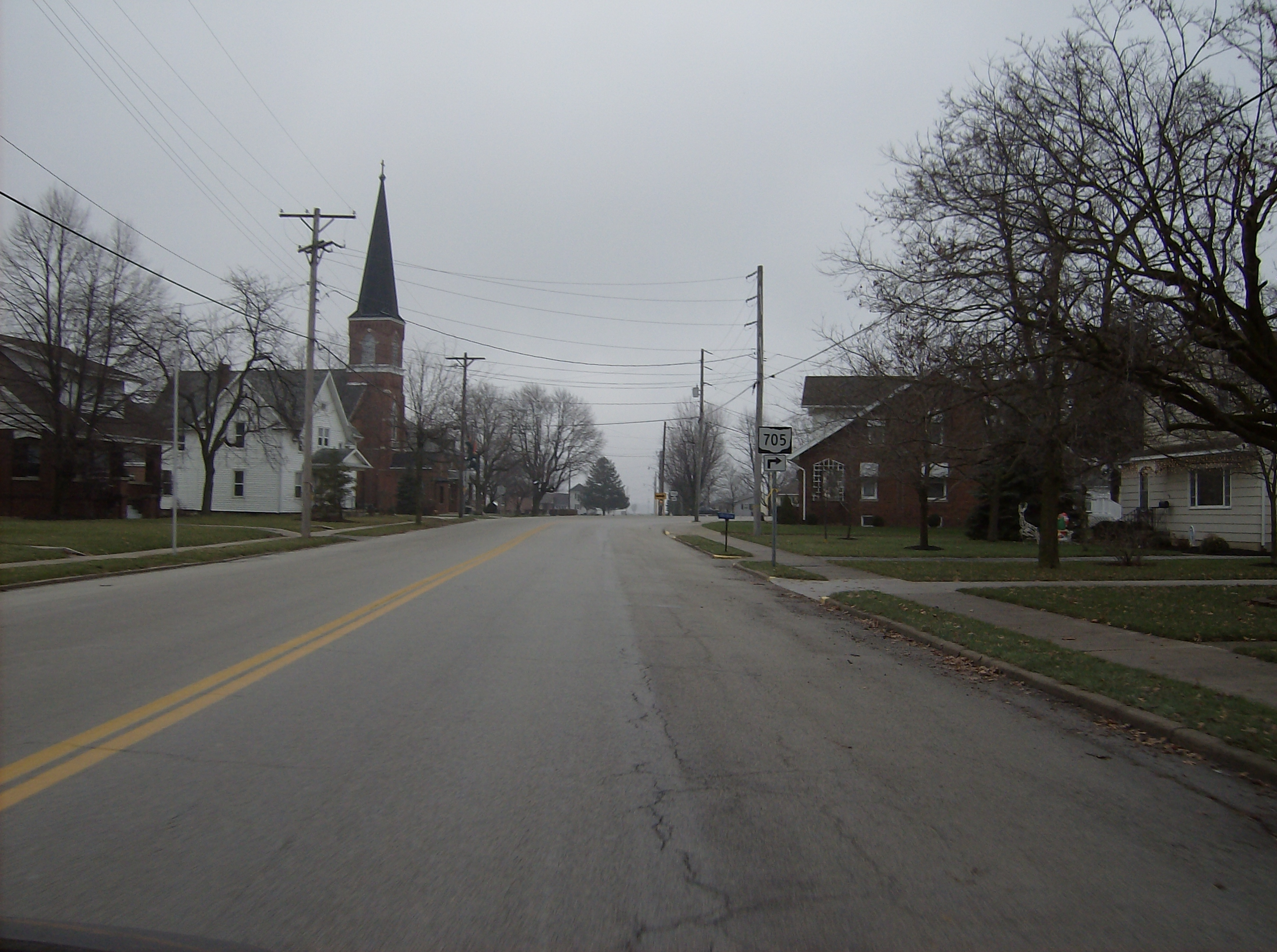
- Main Street in Osgood

- Location in Darke County and the state of Ohio
- Coordinates: 40°20′19″N 84°29′56″W
- Country: United States
- State: Ohio
- County: Darke
- Township: Patterson

Area
  - Total: 0.35 sq mi (0.91 km^{2})
  - Land: 0.35 sq mi (0.91 km^{2})
  - Water: 0 sq mi (0.00 km^{2})
- Elevation: 961 ft (293 m)

Population (2020)
  - Total: 306
  - Density: 869.3/sq mi (335.64/km^{2})
- Time zone: UTC-5 (Eastern (EST))
  - Summer (DST): UTC-4 (EDT)
- ZIP code: 45351
- Area code: 419
- FIPS code: 39-58912
- GNIS feature ID: 2399590
- Website: https://www.osgoodohio.com/

Osgood is a village in Darke County, Ohio, United States. The population was 306 at the 2020 census.

== History ==
Osgood was founded in the 1880s. While its earliest settlers were primarily Protestants, a Roman Catholic parish was erected in the village in 1906. Today, St. Nicholas' Catholic Church has been recognized as a historic site.

== Geography ==
According to the United States Census Bureau, the village has a total area of 0.34 square miles (0.88 km^{2}), all land.

== Demographics ==
Historical population
Census	Pop.	Note	%±
1890	242		—
1900	224		−7.4%
1910	214		−4.5%
1920	175		−18.2%
1930	152		−13.1%
1940	179		17.8%
1950	194		8.4%
1960	241		24.2%
1970	289		19.9%
1980	306		5.9%
1990	255		−16.7%
2000	255		0.0%
2010	302		18.4%
2020	306		1.3%
U.S. Decennial Census

=== 2010 census ===
As of the census of 2010, there were 302 people, 120 households, and 82 families living in the village. The population density was 888.2 inhabitants per square mile (342.9/km^{2}). There were 121 housing units at an average density of 355.9 per square mile (137.4/km^{2}). The racial makeup of the village was 98.3% White and 1.7% Native American. Hispanic or Latino of any race were 1.3% of the population.

There were 120 households, of which 30.0% had children under the age of 18 living with them, 60.8% were married couples living together, 6.7% had a female householder with no husband present, 0.8% had a male householder with no wife present, and 31.7% were non-families. 29.2% of all households were made up of individuals, and 20% had someone living alone who was 65 years of age or older. The average household size was 2.52 and the average family size was 3.17.

The median age in the village was 38.4 years. 28.5% of residents were under the age of 18; 5.6% were between the ages of 18 and 24; 26.1% were from 25 to 44; 17.5% were from 45 to 64; and 22.2% were 65 years of age or older. The gender makeup of the village was 52.6% male and 47.4% female.

=== 2000 census ===
As of the census of 2000, there were 255 people, 103 households, and 77 families living in the village. The population density was 742.1 inhabitants per square mile (286.5/km^{2}). There were 104 housing units at an average density of 302.7 per square mile (116.9/km^{2}). The racial makeup of the village was 100.00% White.

There were 103 households, out of which 25.2% had children under the age of 18 living with them, 64.1% were married couples living together, 5.8% had a female householder with no husband present, and 25.2% were non-families. 24.3% of all households were made up of individuals, and 19.4% had someone living alone who was 65 years of age or older. The average household size was 2.48 and the average family size was 2.92.

In the village, the population was spread out, with 23.5% under the age of 18, 5.1% from 18 to 24, 27.8% from 25 to 44, 20.8% from 45 to 64, and 22.7% who were 65 years of age or older. The median age was 38 years. For every 100 females, there were 96.2 males. For every 100 females age 18 and over, there were 91.2 males.

The median income for a household in the village was $41,731, and the median income for a family was $48,125. Males had a median income of $37,875 versus $24,375 for females. The per capita income for the village was $18,686. None of the families and 0.4% of the population were living below the poverty line.
