= Holy Family Catholic Church (Frenchtown, Ohio) =

- U.S. National Register of Historic Places
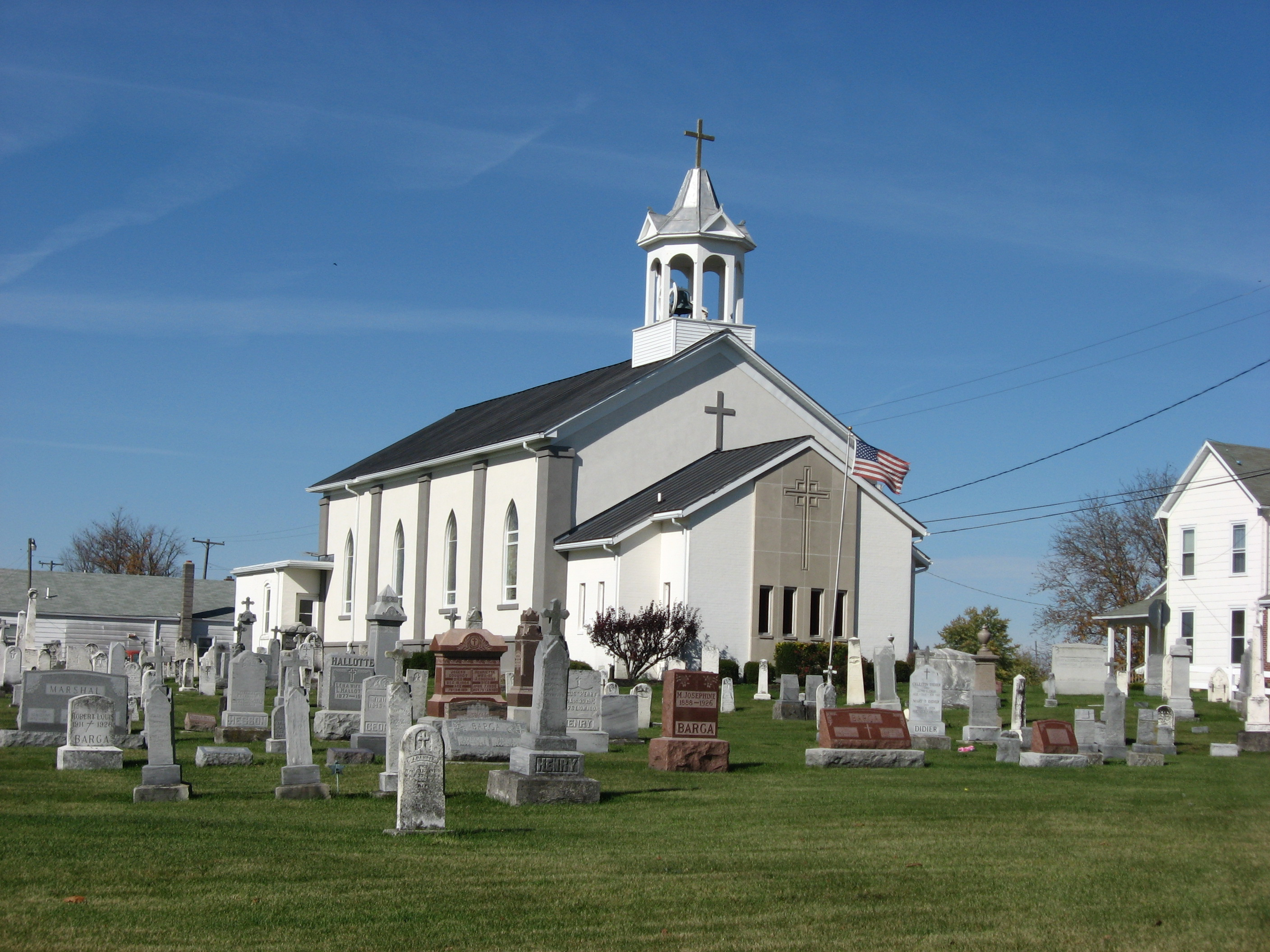
- Church and cemetery

- Location within Ohio Location within the United States
- Location: State Route 185 in Wayne Township, Darke County, Ohio
- Nearest city: Frenchtown
- Coordinates: 40°14′46″N 84°31′25″W
- Area: less than one acre
- Built: 1866
- Architectural style: Gothic Revival
- MPS: Cross-Tipped Churches of Ohio TR
- NRHP reference No.: 79002817
- Added to NRHP: July 26, 1979

Holy Family Catholic Church is a historic Roman Catholic church in Wayne Township, Darke County, Ohio, United States. Located in the unincorporated community of Frenchtown, it houses an active congregation, and it has been accorded historic site status because of its well-preserved Gothic Revival architecture.

== Parish history ==
The first settlers of northeastern Darke County and southwestern Shelby County were predominantly French. The first parish in the region encompassed the areas now divided between St. Denis Parish in Versailles, St. Remy Parish in Russia, and Holy Family Parish. This parish, originally known as St. Valbert's Church, was organized among these French settlers in 1839, with its church located 3 miles (4.8 km) northeast of Versailles; it was a mother church of the Missionaries of the Precious Blood, who were beginning to minister to the Catholic population of the region at this time. In 1846, St. Remy and Holy Family parishes were created as separate parishes, while St. Valbert relocated to Versailles and was rededicated to St. Denis in 1864.

Members of Holy Family Church quickly began to organize their congregation, completing a log church by the end of 1846; after it burned in 1848, another log church was built. At the same time, the members of St. Remy's Church were beginning to build a church, and competition began to arise between the two parishes. Ultimately, a wager was agreed upon of two gallons of whisky, to be given to the first parish to lay the log foundation for their churches; Holy Family won the prize. As more French settlers continued to arrive in the 1850s and early 1860s, the church became too small, and the members decided to erect a larger brick structure.

== Architecture ==
The present Holy Family Church was completed in 1866 in the Gothic Revival style. Its gabled roof is topped with a bell tower; the walls are of brick painted white, and the building rests on a stone foundation without a basement. Most of the exterior remains little changed from its original format, although the entrance has been hidden by the addition of a small structure in 1964. The interior has been changed more substantially than the exterior; the original elaborate altars and statues have been removed, and the original baptistery and sacristy have been replaced by a new baptistery and sacristy in the 1964 addition. Still present is the interior lighting from the original lancet windows of stained glass, each inscribed with the name of the individuals who paid for the window.

Architectural historians have divided the Precious Blood-related churches of western Ohio into multiple generations. Only a few buildings remain from the first generation, which consisted primarily of small wooden churches, and only St. John's Church in Fryburg remains essentially unchanged. Replacing these wooden buildings were the churches of the second generation, which were generally small brick buildings without tall spires. Holy Family's simple rectangular plan and small bell tower makes it a fine example of the churches of the second generation.

== Related properties ==
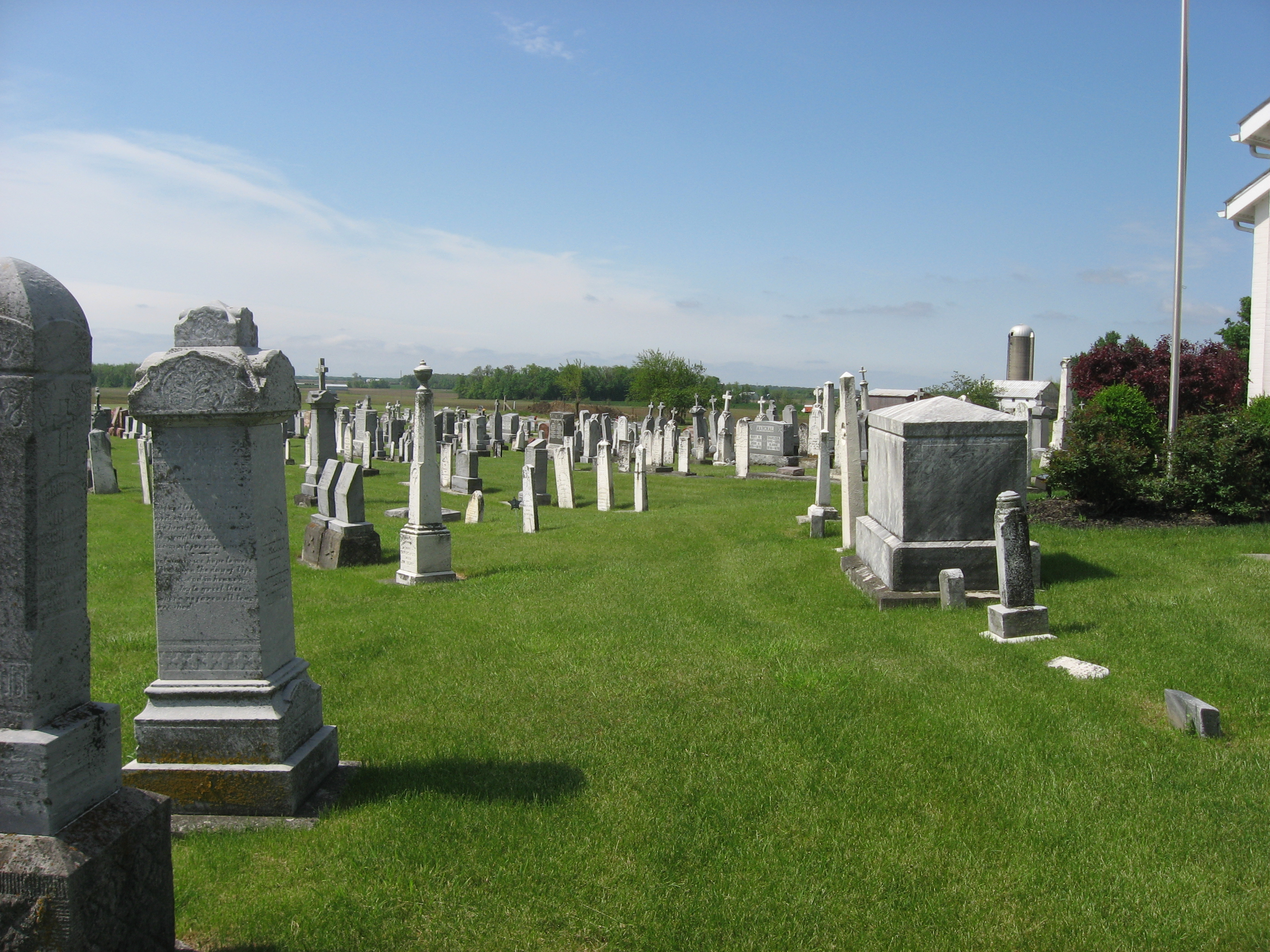
Holy Family Cemetery

Located on the southwestern corner of Frenchtown's primary intersection, that of Burns Road and State Route 185, the church is partially surrounded by other properties associated with the parish. Members of Holy Family Church first built a rectory for their pastor in 1850. It was replaced by a larger brick structure in the 1880s; it lies on the northern side of Burns Road, directly across from the church. A more recent parish hall is located on the southern side of the road to the west of the church. A church cemetery, small but heavily used, lies immediately to the south and east of the church. Founded before the establishment of the parish, the cemetery includes burials as old as 1842; it is officially known as the "Frenchtown Cemetery," although it has also been known as the "Holy Family Cemetery."

== Recent history ==
A 1977 architectural survey ranked the church's exterior in good condition; its interior was only noted as "modified." In 1979, Holy Family Catholic Church was listed on the National Register of Historic Places. Thirty-two other properties, including twenty-five other churches, were listed on the National Register at the same time as part of a multiple property submission of properties in western Ohio related to the Missionaries of the Precious Blood. Among these thirty-two other buildings were St. Remy's Church in Russia and two other churches in northeastern Darke County. The tall towers and Gothic Revival architecture of many of these churches has caused this region of western Ohio to be nicknamed the "Land of the Cross-Tipped Churches."

Today, Holy Family is an active parish of the Archdiocese of Cincinnati. It is clustered with Immaculate Conception Parish in Bradford, St. Denis Parish in Versailles, and St. Mary Parish in Greenville. The entire cluster is a part of the Sidney Deanery.
