= Russia, Ohio =

- Village
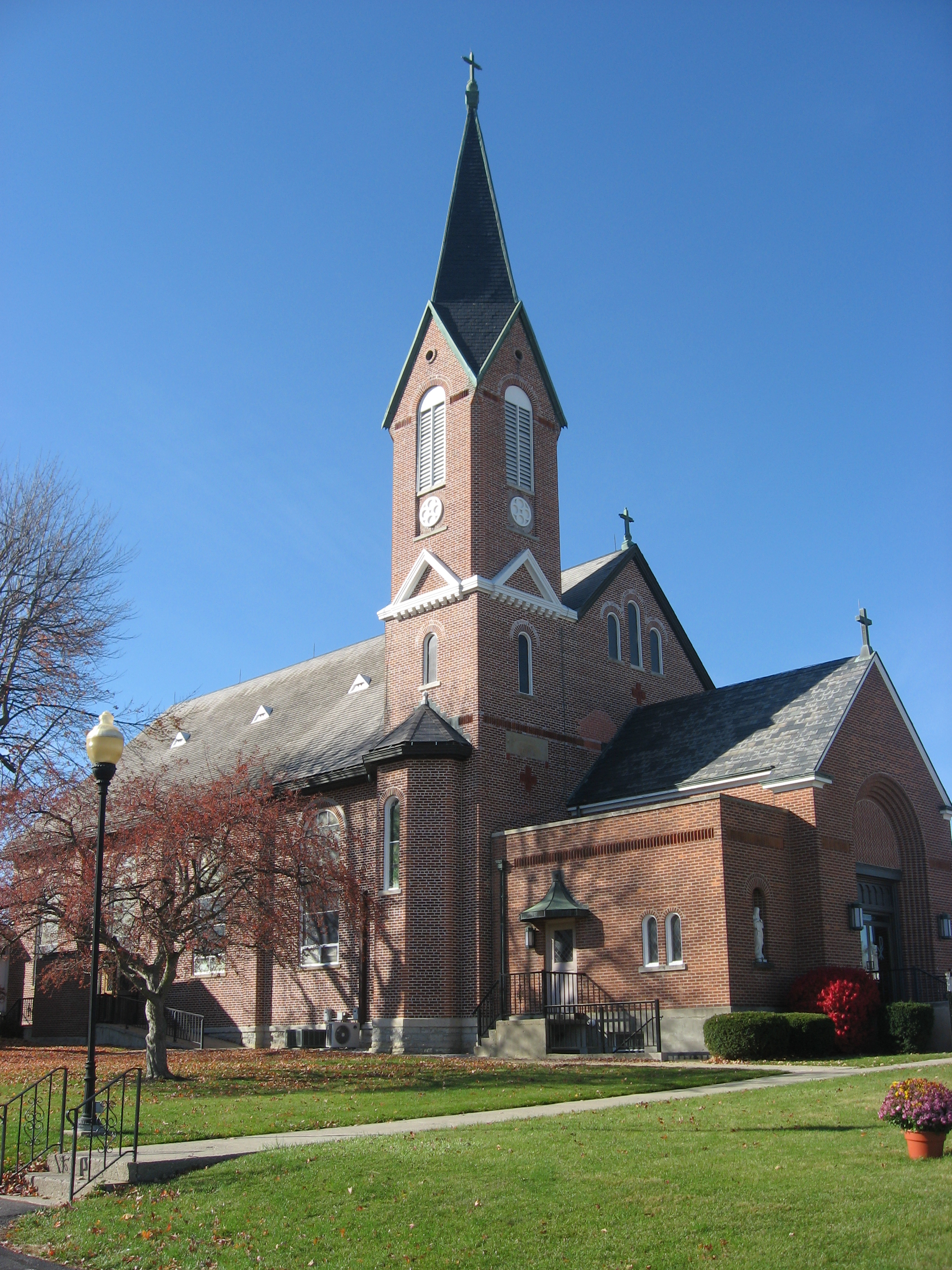
- St. Remy Catholic Church, a community landmark

- Flag Seal

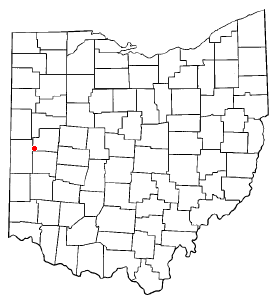
- Location of Russia, Ohio

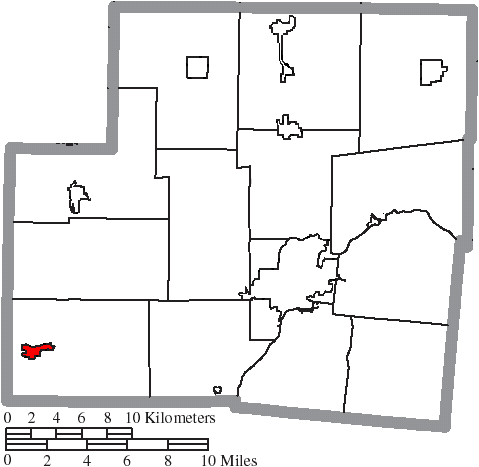
- Location of Russia in Shelby County
- Coordinates: 40°14′02″N 84°24′20″W
- Country: United States
- State: Ohio
- County: Shelby

Government
  - Mayor: Mary Jo High

Area
  - Total: 0.88 sq mi (2.27 km^{2})
  - Land: 0.86 sq mi (2.24 km^{2})
  - Water: 0.0077 sq mi (0.02 km^{2})
- Elevation: 971 ft (296 m)

Population (2020)
  - Total: 712
  - Density: 821.5/sq mi (317.17/km^{2})
- Time zone: UTC-5 (Eastern (EST))
  - Summer (DST): UTC-4 (EDT)
- ZIP code: 45363
- Area codes: 937, 326
- FIPS code: 39-69344
- GNIS feature ID: 2399149
- Website: http://www.russiaoh.com/

Russia (/ˈruː.ʃi/, ROO-shee) is a village in Loramie Township, Shelby County, Ohio, United States. The population was 712 at the 2020 census.

== History ==
Russia was founded by Lewis Phillips, who purchased and plotted the land where the village now sits. Phillips' house, built in 1853, was the first house in Russia; other settlers followed by the late 1850s. Phillips was also the first businessman in the village, opening a grocery store in 1853. Later settlers soon founded a dry goods store and multiple sawmills; Russia's economy was once heavily dependent on its sawmills. Among the earliest settlers were French-speaking Swiss who had served under Napoléon Bonaparte during the French invasion of Russia in 1812. According to tradition, the village's name commemorates a battle these veterans had fought in Russia.

Russia was established in an area that was already predominantly French. In the early part of the nineteenth century, a large number of emigrants from Alsace, Lorraine, and other parts of France settled in southwestern Shelby County and the adjacent portions of northeastern Darke County. Besides Russia, these immigrants founded the communities of Frenchtown and Versailles. By the middle of the 1850s, the heavily Roman Catholic population had grown to the point that multiple parishes were established in the area. A log church was built and dedicated to Saint Remigius, the patron saint of France, and Mass was first celebrated there on June 15, 1854. The congregation soon outgrew its building and constructed a new brick church; when it became too small, a larger brick church was constructed and completed in 1892. The village is one of many small communities in a heavily Catholic region of western Ohio known as the "Land of the Cross-Tipped Churches".

== Geography ==
According to the United States Census Bureau, the village has a total area of 0.79 square miles (2.05 km^{2}), of which 0.78 square miles (2.02 km^{2}) is land and 0.01 square miles (0.03 km^{2}) is water.

== Demographics ==
Historical population
Census	Pop.	Note	%±
1880	91		—
1970	420		—
1980	438		4.3%
1990	442		0.9%
2000	551		24.7%
2010	640		16.2%
2020	712		11.3%
U.S. Decennial Census

The median income for a household in the village was $56,035.

=== 2010 census ===
As of the census of 2010, there were 640 people, 224 households, and 173 families residing in the village. The population density was 820.5 inhabitants per square mile (316.8/km^{2}). There were 242 housing units at an average density of 310.3 per square mile (119.8/km^{2}). The racial makeup of the village was 99.2% White and 0.8% from two or more races. Hispanic or Latino of any race were 0.2% of the population.

There were 224 households, of which 44.2% had children under the age of 18 living with them, 65.6% were married couples living together, 7.6% had a female householder with no husband present, 4.0% had a male householder with no wife present, and 22.8% were non-families. 21.9% of all households were made up of individuals, and 12.1% had someone living alone who was 65 years of age or older. The average household size was 2.86 and the average family size was 3.34.

The median age in the village was 31.6 years. 35% of residents were under the age of 18; 8% were between the ages of 18 and 24; 24% were from 25 to 44; 19.8% were from 45 to 64; and 13.1% were 65 years of age or older. The gender makeup of the village was 48.4% male and 51.6% female.

== Education ==
Russia has a public library, a branch of Shelby County Libraries. The town is home to one school, Russia Local School, which enrolls grades K-12. Included is the Russia High School. The school's athletic programs' mascot is the Raider.

== Village flag ==
According to the village website, "Russia is a proud village built upon Christian principles, hard work, and a close-knit, community-minded population. Symbols and colors were selected to underscore the town's French and Catholic heritage in addition to how agriculture and industry largely contributed to the development of the community over time."
