= Frenchtown, Darke County, Ohio =

Frenchtown, Ohio
- Unincorporated community
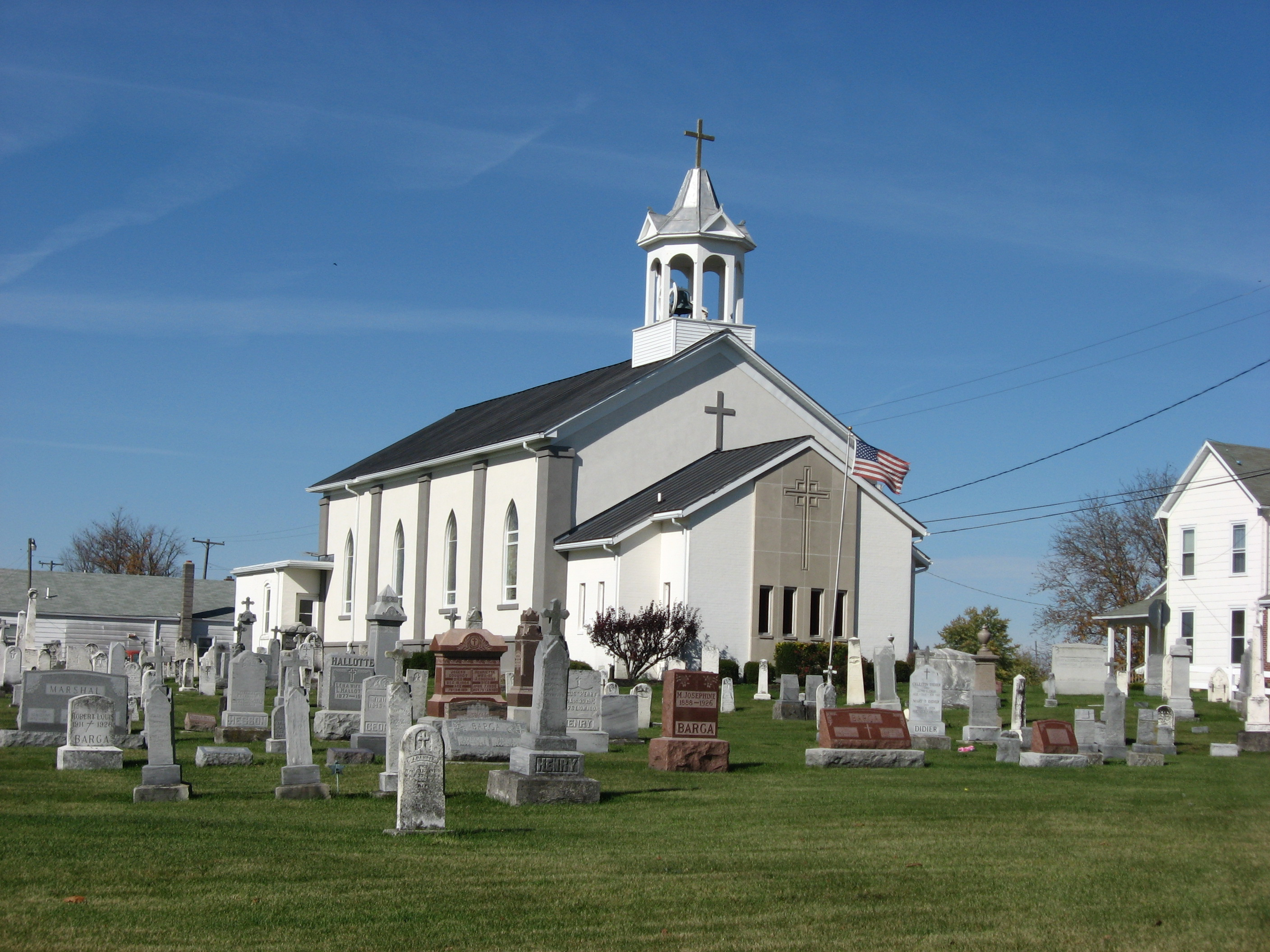
- Holy Family Church and Cemetery

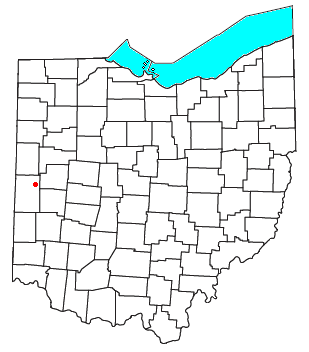
- Location of Frenchtown, Ohio
- Coordinates: 40°14′47″N 84°31′26″W
- Country: United States
- State: Ohio
- County: Darke
- Township: Wayne
- Elevation: 1,027 ft (313 m)
- Time zone: UTC-5 (Eastern (EST))
  - Summer (DST): UTC-4 (EDT)
- GNIS feature ID: 1048761

Frenchtown is an unincorporated community in Wayne Township, Darke County, Ohio, United States. The community lies at the intersection of State Route 185 with Burns and Mangen Roads, approximately 2 miles (3.2 km) northwest of the village of Versailles.

== History ==
The community was settled in the early nineteenth century primarily by people of French descent, including many Alsatians and Lorrainers. These settlers long retained their French roots: into the late nineteenth century, the community was heavily Roman Catholic, and their public inscriptions were made in the French language. Although stores and a school were founded in Frenchtown soon after settlement, no post office was ever established there; residents' mail went to the Versailles post office. Since the nineteenth century, the community has shrunk considerably; little now remains of Frenchtown except houses and a church complex. This church, Holy Family Catholic Church, is a community landmark: built in the 1860s, it is listed on the National Register of Historic Places.
