= National Register of Historic Places listings in Auglaize County, Ohio =

Location of Auglaize County in Ohio

This is a list of the National Register of Historic Places listings in Auglaize County, Ohio.

This is intended to be a complete list of the properties and districts on the National Register of Historic Places in Auglaize County, Ohio, United States. The locations of National Register properties and districts for which the latitude and longitude coordinates are included below, may be seen in a Google map.

There are 24 properties and districts listed on the National Register in the county, including 1 National Historic Landmark.

This National Park Service list is complete through NPS recent listings posted July 31, 2026.

== Current listings ==
	Name on the Register	Image	Date listed	Location	City or town	Description
1	Auglaize County Courthouse	Auglaize County Courthouse	May 7, 1973 (#73001387)	Courthouse Sq. 40°34′06″N 84°11′40″W	Wapakoneta	
2	Blume High School	Blume High School	August 22, 1996 (#96000933)	405-409 S. Blackhoof St. 40°33′58″N 84°11′50″W	Wapakoneta	
3	Adolph Boesel House	Adolph Boesel House	November 29, 1979 (#79001784)	110 S. Franklin St. 40°26′04″N 84°23′01″W	New Bremen	Destroyed. The house was moved to 400 Easthaven Dr., New Bremen, Ohio
4	Julius Boesel House	Julius Boesel House	March 30, 1978 (#78002008)	North of New Bremen on Quellhorst Rd. 40°26′56″N 84°22′40″W	German Township	
5	Egypt Catholic Church and Rectory	Egypt Catholic Church and Rectory	July 26, 1979 (#79003455)	Junction of Minster-Egypt Rd. and State Route 364 at Egypt; 40°23′05″N 84°26′04″W	Jackson Township	
6	First Presbyterian Church of Wapakoneta	First Presbyterian Church of Wapakoneta	August 23, 1985 (#85001797)	106 W. Main St. 40°34′11″N 84°11′48″W	Wapakoneta	
7	H.E. Fledderjohann House, Doctor's Office and Summer Kitchen	H.E. Fledderjohann House, Doctor's Office and Summer Kitchen	December 10, 1993 (#93001388)	107 E. German St. 40°29′36″N 84°18′56″W	New Knoxville	
8	Fort Amanda Site	Fort Amanda Site	November 10, 1970 (#70000484)	9 mi (14 km) northwest of Wapakoneta on State Route 198; 40°40′53″N 84°16′06″W	Logan Township	
9	The Fountain Hotel	The Fountain Hotel	December 19, 1997 (#97001564)	100-110 W. Spring St. 40°32′34″N 84°23′20″W	St. Marys	
10	Glynnwood Catholic Church	Glynnwood Catholic Church	July 26, 1979 (#79003454)	6 mi (9.7 km) northeast of St. Marys on Glynnwood Rd. in Glynnwood; 40°34′59″N 84°19′05″W	Moulton Township	
11	Holy Rosary Catholic Church	Holy Rosary Catholic Church	July 26, 1979 (#79003456)	Junction of E. Spring and S. Pine Sts. 40°32′42″N 84°22′58″W	St. Marys	Destroyed and replaced with a modern structure
12	William Luelleman House	William Luelleman House	May 21, 1975 (#75001322)	122 N. Main St. 40°26′20″N 84°22′56″W	New Bremen	
13	Miami and Erie Canal Deep Cut	Miami and Erie Canal Deep Cut	October 15, 1966 (#66000603)	2 mi (3.2 km) south of Spencerville on State Route 66; 40°41′06″N 84°21′57″W	Salem Township	Extends into Spencer Township in Allen County
14	Minster Elementary School	Minster Elementary School	July 26, 1979 (#79002850)	Lincoln St. 40°23′42″N 84°22′44″W	Minster	
15	John H. Nichols House	John H. Nichols House	July 14, 1988 (#88001064)	103 S. Blackhoof St. 40°34′10″N 84°11′47″W	Wapakoneta	
16	Hugh T. Rinehart House	Hugh T. Rinehart House	November 27, 1978 (#78002009)	22011 State Route 67, east of Uniopolis; 40°36′02″N 84°01′57″W	Union Township	
17	Round Barn	Round Barn	April 17, 1980 (#80002942)	Along State Route 385, 3 mi (4.8 km) east of New Hampshire; 40°33′24″N 83°53′35″W	Goshen Township	
18	St. Augustine Catholic Church	St. Augustine Catholic Church	July 26, 1979 (#79003457)	N. Hanover St. 40°23′40″N 84°22′47″W	Minster	
19	St. John Catholic Church and Parish Hall	St. John Catholic Church and Parish Hall	July 26, 1979 (#79003451)	Southwestern corner of Schlemel and Van Buren Sts. in Fryburg; 40°30′58″N 84°08′54″W	Pusheta Township	
20	St. Joseph Catholic Church and School	St. Joseph Catholic Church and School	July 26, 1979 (#79003453)	309 S. Perry St. 40°34′04″N 84°11′43″W	Wapakoneta	
21	Uniopolis Town Hall	Uniopolis Town Hall	July 22, 1994 (#94000773)	Ohio St. (State Route 67) east of its junction with Main St. 40°36′08″N 84°05′15″W	Uniopolis	
22	Wapakoneta Commercial Historic District	Wapakoneta Commercial Historic District	January 5, 1989 (#88003131)	Roughly bounded by Auglaize, Park, Main, and Blackhoof Sts. 40°34′12″N 84°11′39″W	Wapakoneta	
23	Dr. Issac Elmer Williams House and Office	Dr. Issac Elmer Williams House and Office	May 8, 1979 (#79001785)	407-411 N. Main St. 40°32′44″N 84°23′34″W	St. Marys	
24	Charles Wintzer Building	Charles Wintzer Building	July 8, 2010 (#10000455)	202 W. Auglaize St. 40°34′15″N 84°11′47″W	Wapakoneta	

== See also ==
- List of National Historic Landmarks in Ohio
- Listings in neighboring counties: Allen, Darke, Hardin, Logan, Mercer, Shelby, Van Wert
- National Register of Historic Places listings in Ohio
