= Saint Johns, Ohio =

- Unincorporated community and census-designated place
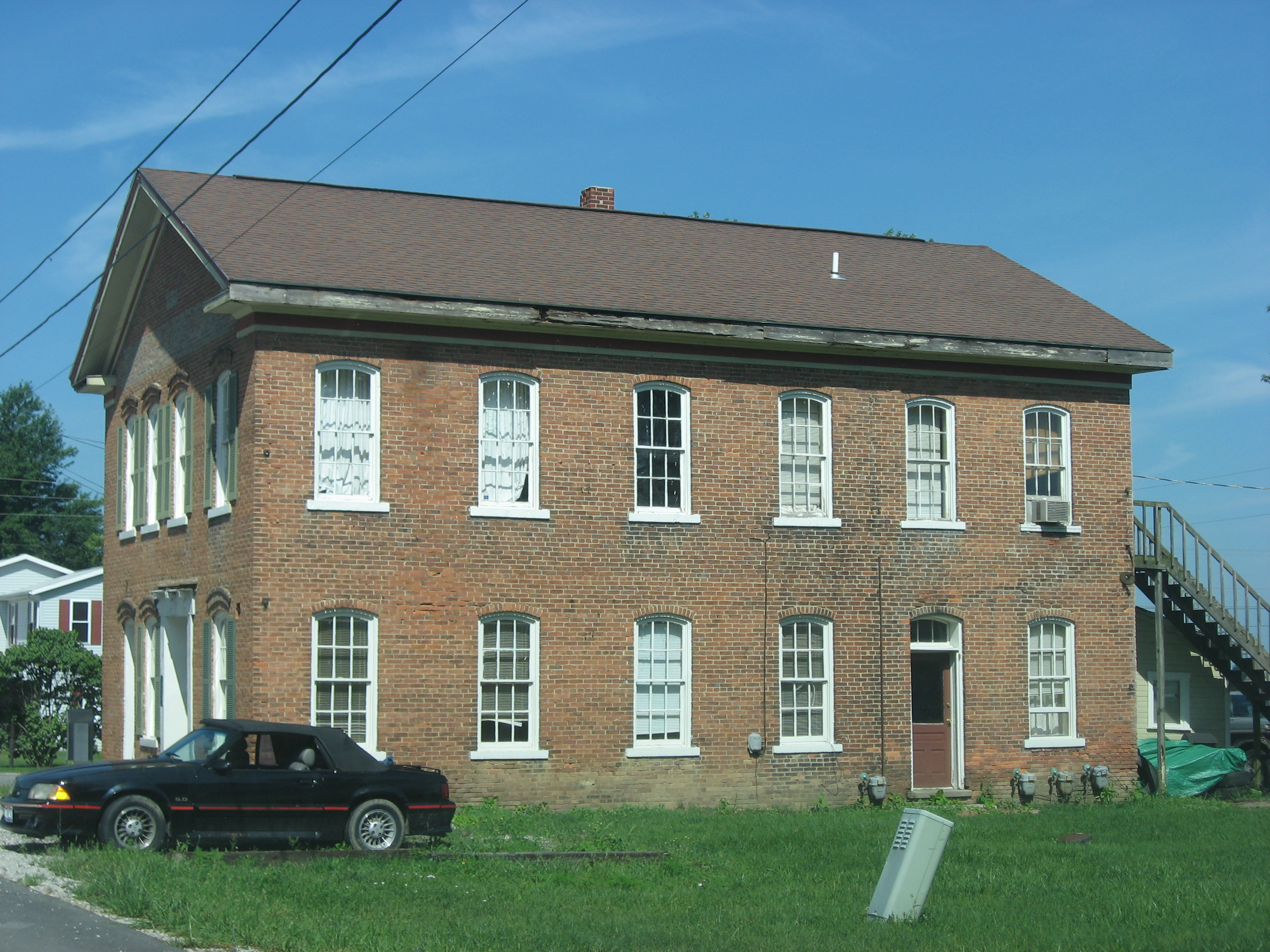
- An old house in Saint Johns

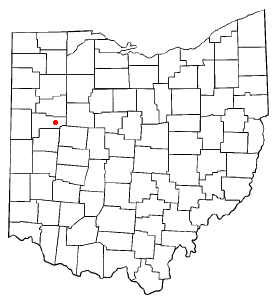
- Location of Saint Johns, Ohio
- Coordinates: 40°33′21″N 84°04′47″W
- Country: United States
- State: Ohio
- County: Auglaize
- Townships: Clay, Union

Area
  - Total: 0.39 sq mi (1.01 km^{2})
  - Land: 0.38 sq mi (0.99 km^{2})
  - Water: 0.007 sq mi (0.018 km^{2})
- Elevation: 1,004 ft (306 m)

Population (2020)
  - Total: 304
  - Density: 800/sq mi (310/km^{2})
- Time zone: UTC-5 (Eastern (EST))
  - Summer (DST): UTC-4 (EDT)
- ZIP codes: 45884; 45895 (Wapakoneta)
- Area code(s): 419 & 567
- FIPS code: 3969596
- GNIS feature ID: 2628970

Saint Johns is a census-designated place located along the border between the Union and Clay townships of Auglaize County, Ohio, United States. As of the 2020 census it had a population of 304.

It is located between Indian Lake and Wapakoneta at the intersection of U.S. Route 33 and State Route 65. Served by the Wapakoneta City School District, the zip code for Saint Johns is 45884.

== History ==
Saint Johns was founded in 1835, and named for John Rogers, proprietor. A post office called Saint Johns has been in operation since 1838. In the center of Saint Johns, on the corner of Center Street and Walnut Street, is a memorial recognizing this place to be known as Black Hoof's last home.

== Geography ==
Saint Johns has a total area of 0.391 square miles (1.01 km^{2}), of which 0.384 square miles (0.99 km^{2}) is land and 0.007 square miles (0.018 km^{2}) is water.
