= Logan Township, Auglaize County, Ohio =

Township in Ohio, US

- Township
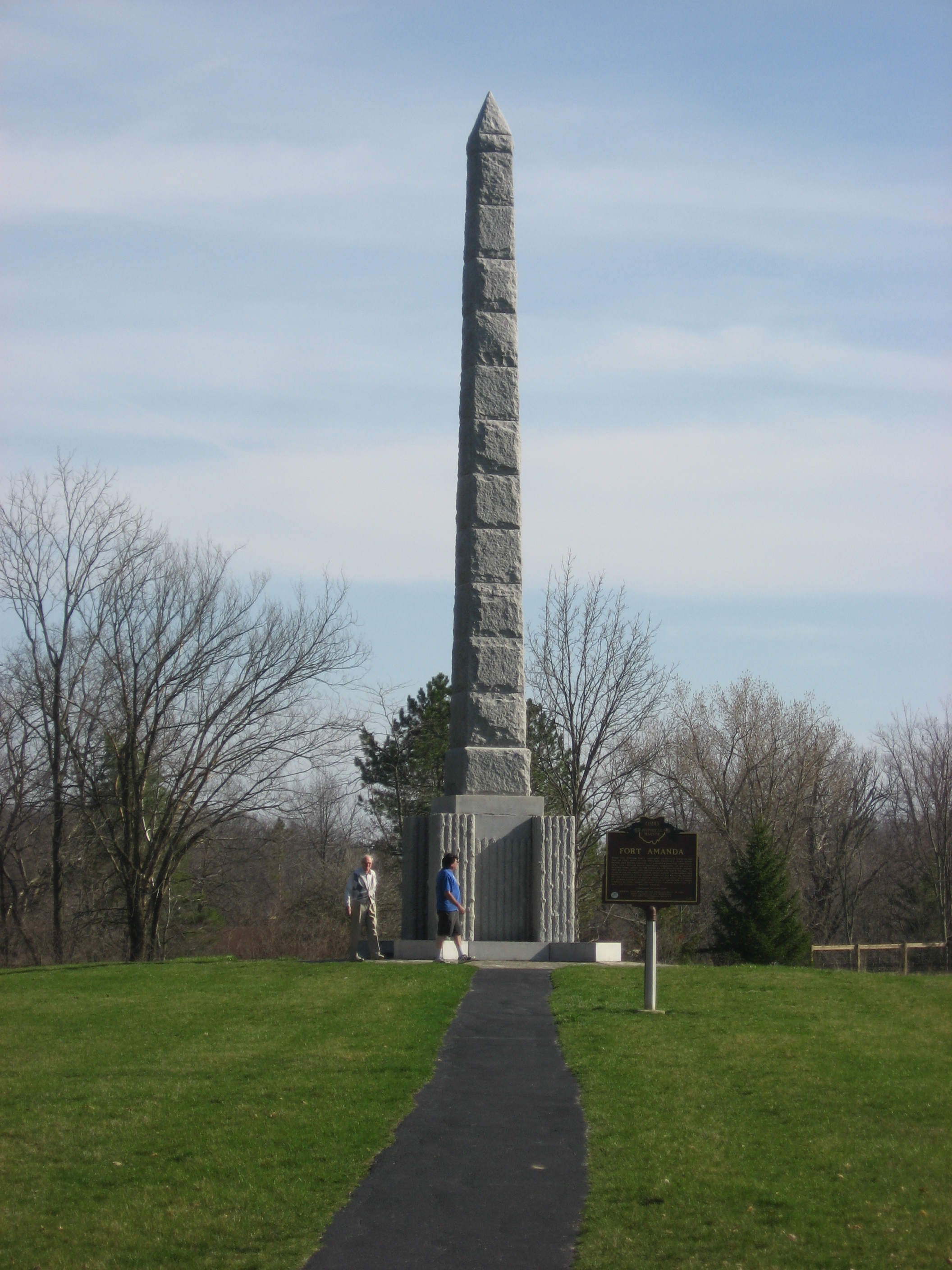
- Site of Fort Amanda

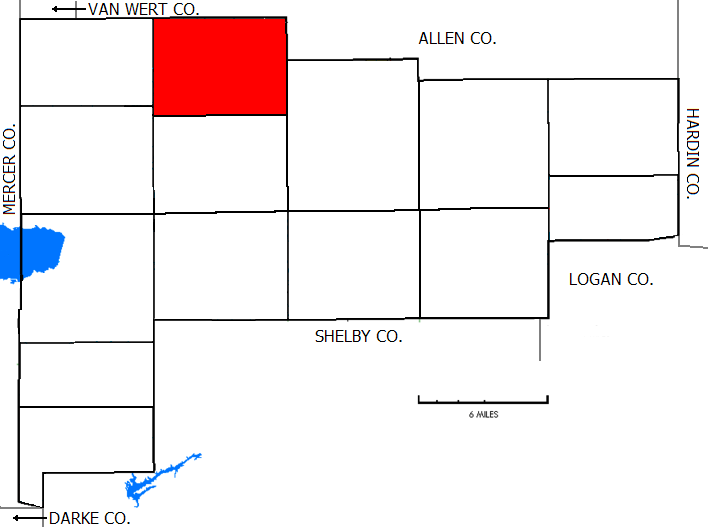
- Location of Logan Township in Auglaize County
- Coordinates: 40°38′58″N 84°16′53″W
- Country: United States
- State: Ohio
- County: Auglaize

Area
  - Total: 28.0 sq mi (72.4 km^{2})
  - Land: 27.9 sq mi (72.3 km^{2})
  - Water: 0.039 sq mi (0.1 km^{2})
- Elevation: 823 ft (251 m)

Population (2020)
  - Total: 1,158
  - Density: 41.5/sq mi (16.0/km^{2})
- Time zone: UTC-5 (Eastern (EST))
  - Summer (DST): UTC-4 (EDT)
- FIPS code: 39-44618
- GNIS feature ID: 1085767

Logan Township is one of the fourteen townships of Auglaize County, Ohio, United States. The 2020 census found 1,158 people in the township.

== Geography ==
Located in the northwestern part of the county, it borders the following townships:

- Amanda Township, Allen County – north
- Shawnee Township, Allen County – northeast
- Duchouquet Township – southeast
- Moulton Township – south
- Noble Township – southwest
- Salem Township – west
- Spencer Township, Allen County – northwest

The village of Buckland is located in southern Logan Township.

Logan Township contains twenty whole sections and six half sections and has a total area of 28.0 square miles (72.4 km^{2}). It is crossed in the east by the Auglaize River.

== Name and history ==
It is the only Logan Township statewide.

Formed in 1848 and named for Captain Logan, a noted Shawnee warrior, Logan Township was originally part of Moulton Township and Amanda Township in Allen County.

== Government ==
The township is governed by a three-member board of trustees, who are elected in November of odd-numbered years to a four-year term beginning on the following January 1. Two are elected in the year after the presidential election and one is elected in the year before it. There is also an elected township fiscal officer, who serves a four-year term beginning on April 1 of the year after the election, which is held in November of the year before the presidential election. Vacancies in the fiscal officership or on the board of trustees are filled by the remaining trustees.

== Public services ==
The township is split between the Wapakoneta City School District, the Saint Marys City School District, Spencerville Local Schools, and Shawnee Local Schools.

The eastern and southern sections of the township is served by the Wapakoneta (45895) post office, the northwestern section by the Spencerville (45887) post office, and the northeastern section by the Cridersville (45806) branch of the Lima post office. Buckland (45819) maintains a local post office.
