= Washington Township, Auglaize County, Ohio =

Township in Ohio, US

- Township
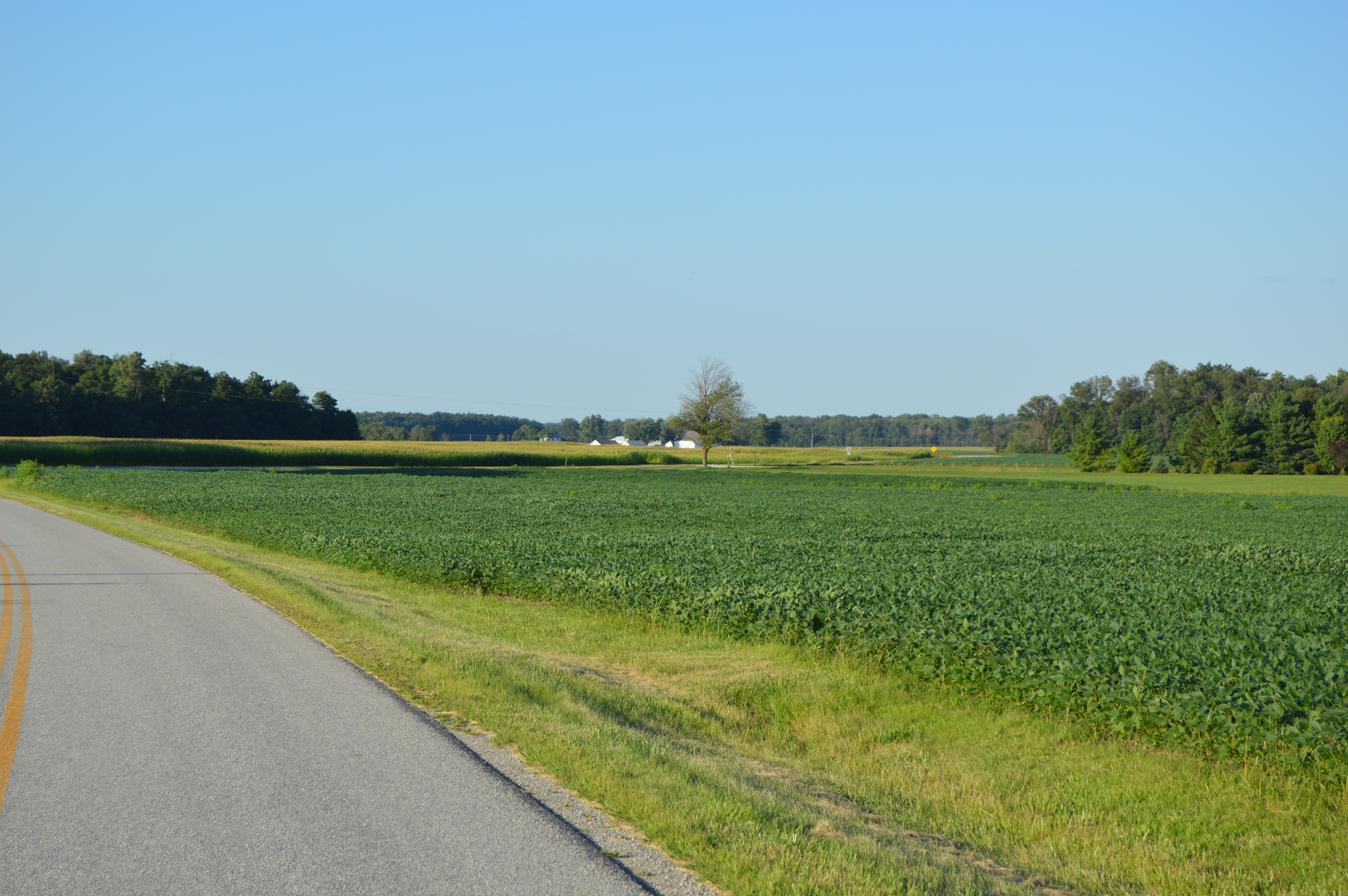
- Fields north of New Knoxville

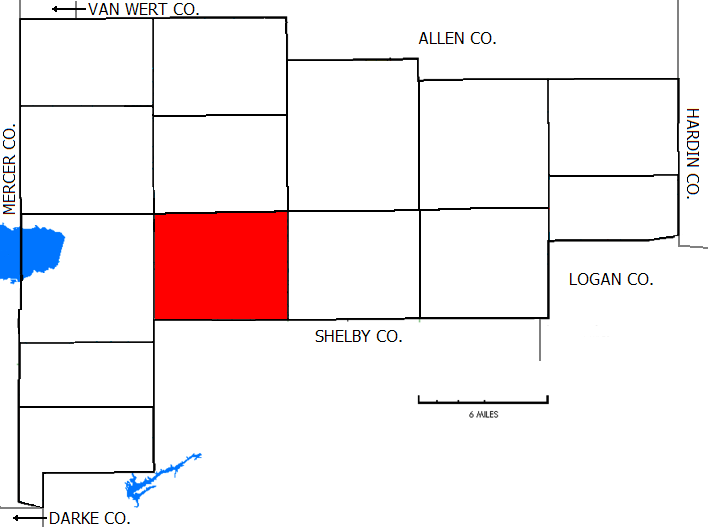
- Location of Washington Township in Auglaize County
- Coordinates: 40°30′13″N 84°17′17″W
- Country: United States
- State: Ohio
- County: Auglaize

Area
  - Total: 31.1 sq mi (80.5 km^{2})
  - Land: 31.1 sq mi (80.5 km^{2})
  - Water: 0 sq mi (0.0 km^{2})
- Elevation: 896 ft (273 m)

Population (2020)
  - Total: 1,944
  - Density: 62.5/sq mi (24.1/km^{2})
- Time zone: UTC-5 (Eastern (EST))
  - Summer (DST): UTC-4 (EDT)
- FIPS code: 39-81074
- GNIS feature ID: 1085774

Washington Township is one of the fourteen townships of Auglaize County, Ohio, United States. The 2020 census found 1,944 people in the township. It is the birthplace of the famous astronaut Neil Armstrong.

== Geography ==
Located in the southern part of the county, it borders the following townships:

- Moulton Township - north
- Duchouquet Township - northeast corner
- Pusheta Township - east
- Dinsmore Township, Shelby County - southeast corner
- Van Buren Township, Shelby County - south
- Saint Marys Township - west
- Noble Township - northwest corner

The village of New Knoxville is located in southwestern Washington Township.

According to the U.S. Census Bureau, the area of the township is 31.1 square miles (80.5 km^{2}).

== Name and history ==
It is one of forty-three Washington Townships statewide.

Originally part of Allen County, the township was formed in 1836.

== Government ==
The township is governed by a three-member board of trustees, who are elected in November of odd-numbered years to a four-year term beginning on the following January 1. Two are elected in the year after the presidential election and one is elected in the year before it. There is also an elected township fiscal officer, who serves a four-year term beginning on April 1 of the year after the election, which is held in November of the year before the presidential election. Vacancies in the fiscal officership or on the board of trustees are filled by the remaining trustees.

== Public services ==
The township is split between the Wapakoneta City School District, the Saint Marys City School District, and the New Knoxville Local School District.

The northwestern section of the township is served by the Saint Marys (45885) post office, the northeastern section by the Wapakoneta (45895) post office, the southern section by the New Knoxville (45871) post office, and the extreme southeastern section by the Botkins (45306) post office.
