= Hugh T. Rinehart House =

Historic house in Ohio, United States

- U.S. National Register of Historic Places
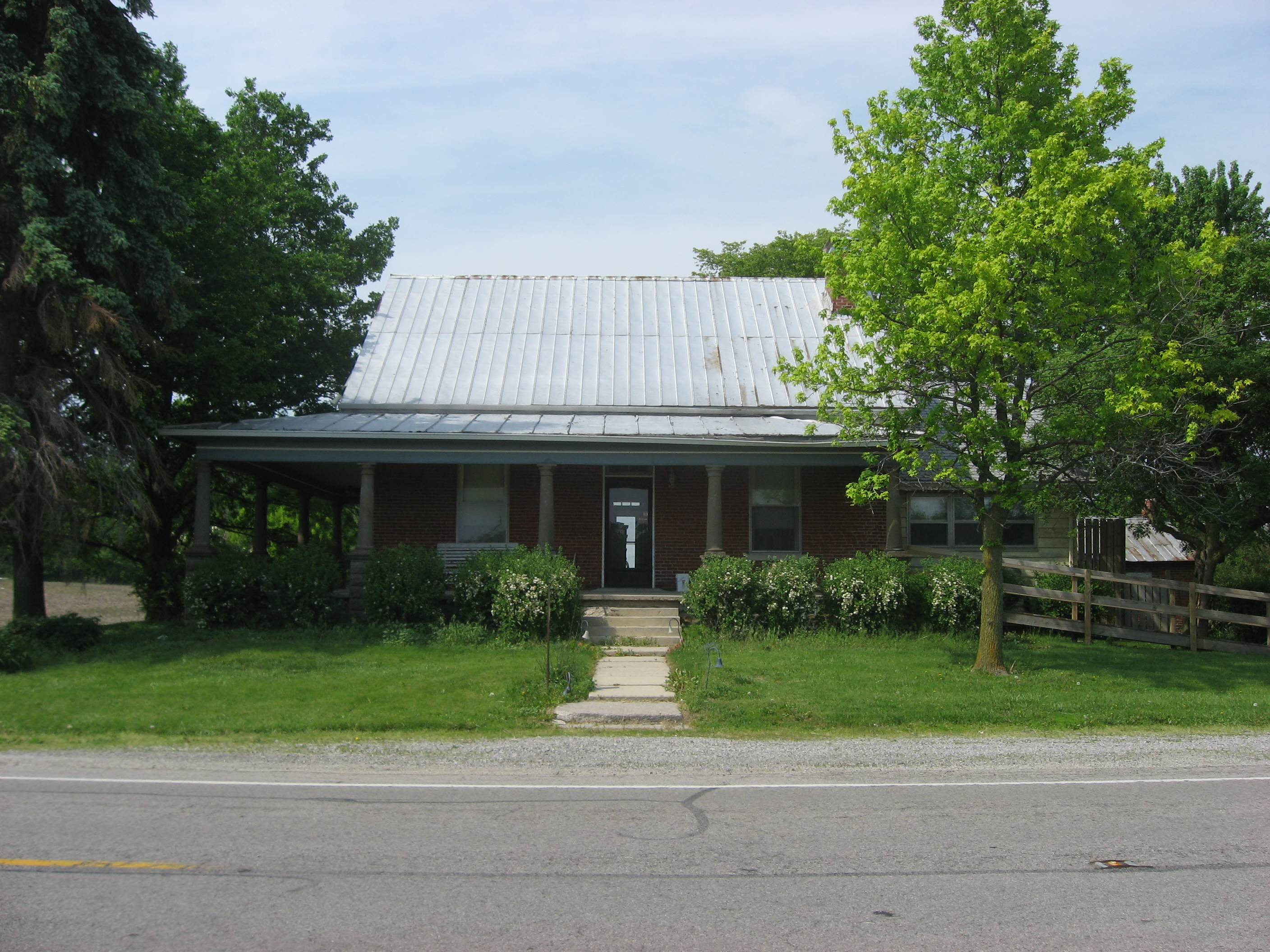
- Front of the house

- Location within Ohio Location within the United States
- Location: 22011 State Route 67, east of Uniopolis
- Nearest city: Uniopolis, Ohio
- Coordinates: 40°36′2″N 84°1′57″W
- Area: 1.2 acres (0.49 ha)
- Built: 1861
- Architect: Hugh T. Rinehart
- Architectural style: Vernacular
- NRHP reference No.: 78002009
- Added to NRHP: November 27, 1978

The Hugh T. Rinehart House (also known as the Ron McCarty House) is a historic house located near Uniopolis in Union Township, Auglaize County, Ohio, United States. A brick structure built in 1861, it was once the home of one of the most prominent citizens of early Auglaize County. It has been designated a historic site because of its high degree of preservation.

== Hugh T. Rinehart ==
Born in 1813, Hugh T. Rinehart was raised on a farm in Tazewell County, Virginia. At the age of twenty, approximately three years after being apprenticed to a blacksmith, he married the former Juliana Godfrey, also a native of Tazewell County. Three years later, they moved to Union Township where he carved a farm out of the wilderness; they were among the first settlers of what today is eastern Auglaize County. Juliana lived on the farm until her death in 1881 and Hugh until 1891. Rinehart was a leading member of Auglaize County society as well as a longtime local politician: he served as a justice of the peace for fifteen years and was twice an unsuccessful candidate for a seat in the Ohio General Assembly. He was also one of the original county commissioners elected at the organization of Auglaize County in 1848.

== Architecture ==
Rinehart built the current house in 1861 along the road between Waynesfield and Wapakoneta, which is now State Route 67. Its architecture is simple: the overall plan is a rectangle, three bays on all four sides, and one-and-one-half stories in height. A stone foundation supports the brick exterior walls. Inside, the house is built primarily of walnut wood panelling that closely resembles its original state.

== Recognition ==
In 1978, the Rinehart House was listed on the National Register of Historic Places. It fit National Register qualifying criterion "B" because of its connection to Hugh T. Rinehart and qualifying criterion "C" because it was an unusually well-preserved period house in the region. Five smaller buildings were included with the house as contributing properties.
