= First Presbyterian Church of Wapakoneta =

Historic church in Ohio, United States

- U.S. National Register of Historic Places
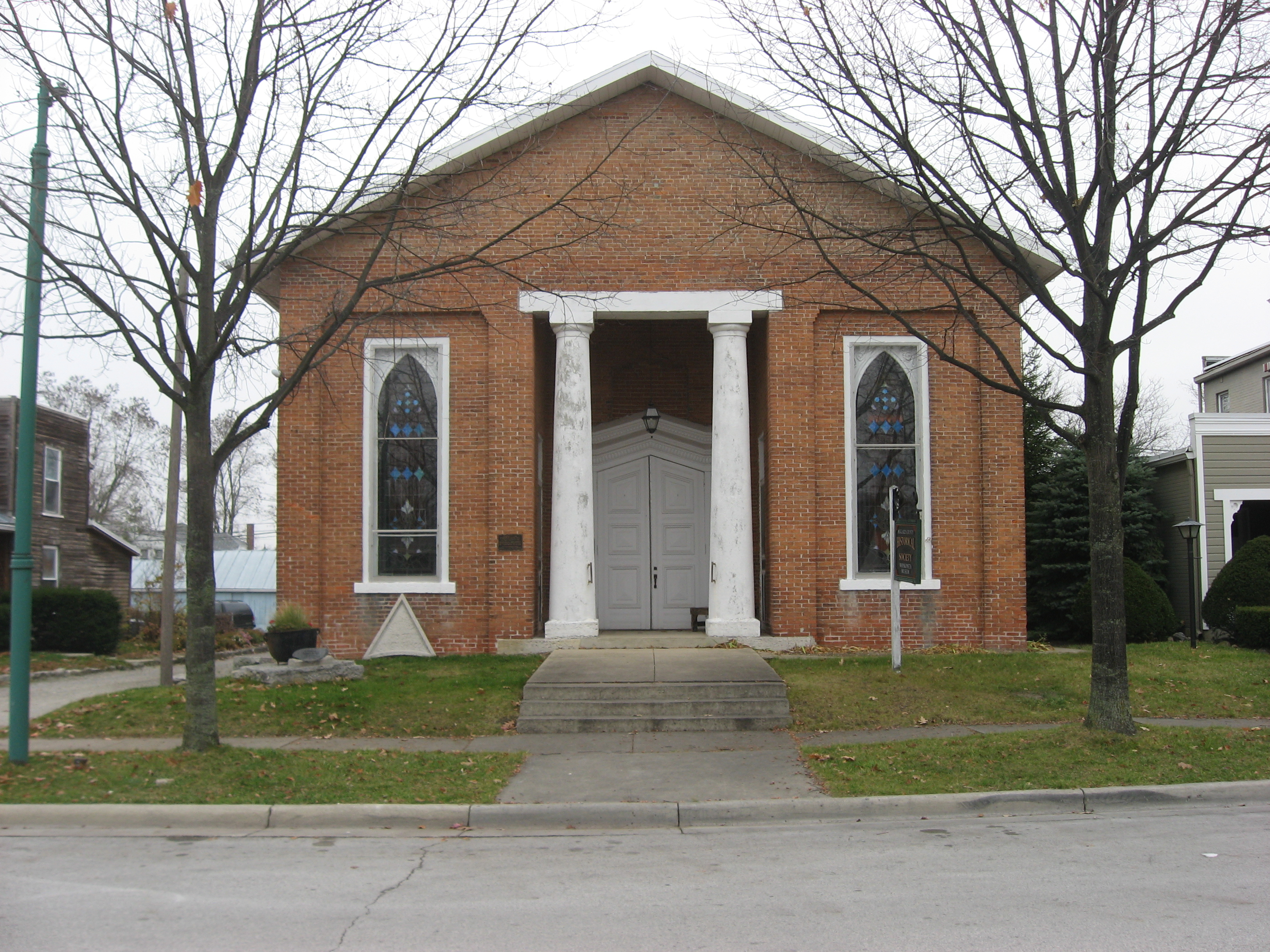
- Front of the church

- Location within Ohio Location within the United States
- Location: 106 W. Main St., Wapakoneta, Ohio
- Coordinates: 40°34′11″N 84°11′48″W
- Area: Less than 1 acre (0.40 ha)
- Built: 1861
- Architect: David Hawkey
- Architectural style: Greek Revival, Distyle in antis mode
- NRHP reference No.: 85001797
- Added to NRHP: August 23, 1985

The First Presbyterian Church of Wapakoneta is a historic former church building in downtown Wapakoneta, Ohio, United States. A small brick building located along Main Street west of the Auglaize County Courthouse, it is the oldest Protestant church building in Auglaize County and the oldest church building of any faith in the city of Wapakoneta. It is historically significant as west-central Ohio's only example of Greek Revival architecture with distyle in antis construction, in which two columns are located in the opening between pilasters.

Organized in 1860, the congregation included many of Auglaize County's leading citizens. Unlike the majority German population of the county, the Presbyterians were primarily immigrants from East Coast states such as Virginia and New York. The congregation was greatly reduced by a financial scandal in the 1920s; reduced to a handful of members, it was disorganized in 1930 and its property sold. After it passed into the possession of the Wapakoneta Women's Club in that year, it served as the clubhouse until 1997, when it was purchased by the Auglaize County Historical Society. Since that time, the church has been converted into the Wapakoneta Museum by the society.

In 1985, the church was listed on the National Register of Historic Places. Key to this honor was its unusual architecture and its connection to the leading members of Auglaize County society during the congregation's heyday.
