= Clay Township, Auglaize County, Ohio =

Township in Ohio, US

- Township
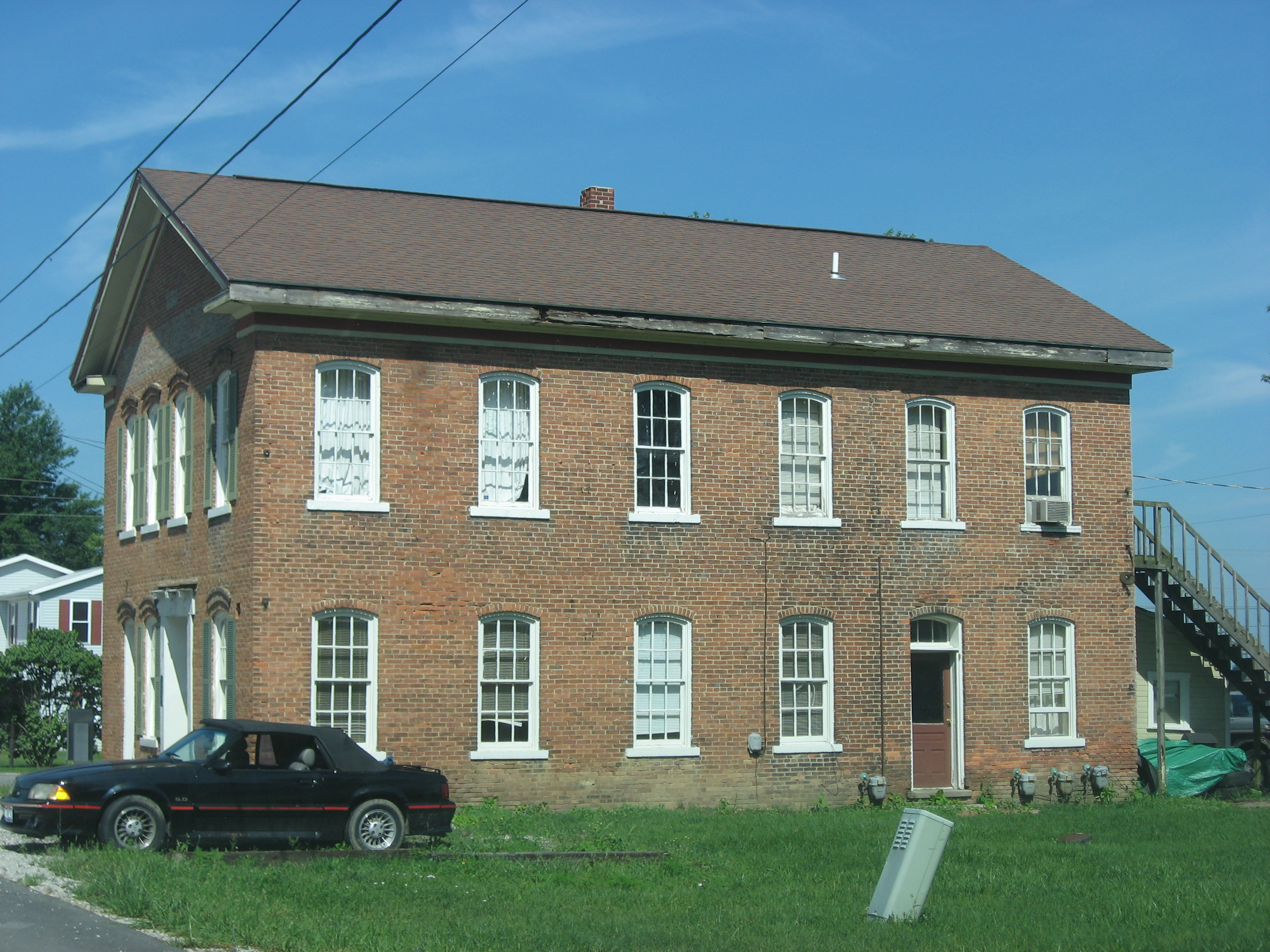
- Old house in Saint Johns

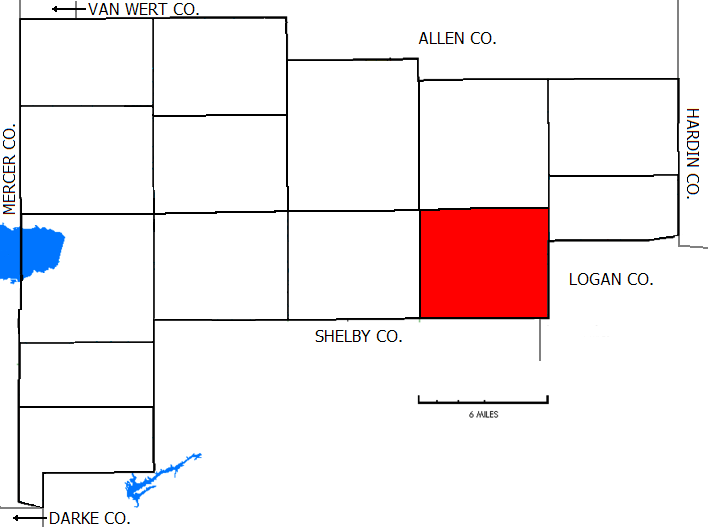
- Location of Clay Township in Auglaize County
- Coordinates: 40°31′45″N 84°3′6″W
- Country: United States
- State: Ohio
- County: Auglaize

Area
  - Total: 30.3 sq mi (78.5 km^{2})
  - Land: 30.3 sq mi (78.5 km^{2})
  - Water: 0 sq mi (0.0 km^{2})
- Elevation: 1,014 ft (309 m)

Population (2020)
  - Total: 790
  - Density: 26/sq mi (10/km^{2})
- Time zone: UTC-5 (Eastern (EST))
  - Summer (DST): UTC-4 (EDT)
- FIPS code: 39-15448
- GNIS feature ID: 1085762

Clay Township is one of the fourteen townships of Auglaize County, Ohio, United States. The 2020 census found 790 people in the township.

== Geography ==
Located in the eastern part of the county, it borders the following townships:

- Union Township - north
- Goshen Township - northeast
- Stokes Township, Logan County - east
- Jackson Township, Shelby County - south
- Dinsmore Township, Shelby County - southwest corner
- Pusheta Township - west
- Duchouquet Township - northwest corner

No municipalities are located in Clay Township, although several unincorporated communities are located in the township:

- Geyer, in the southwest
- Saint Johns, along the northern border with Union Township
- Santa Fe, along the southwestern border with Stokes Township, Logan County

According to the U.S. Census Bureau, Clay Township has an area of 30.3 square miles (78.5 km^{2}).

== Name and history ==
It is one of nine Clay Townships statewide.

The township was formed in 1836, while still a part of Allen County.

The township was also involved in one of the last county border changes in Ohio. This change occurred in 1888 when part of Stokes Township in Logan County was exchanged to Clay Township for part of Goshen Township, Auglaize County, Ohio.

== Government ==
The township is governed by a three-member board of trustees, who are elected in November of odd-numbered years to a four-year term beginning on the following January 1. Two are elected in the year after the presidential election and one is elected in the year before it. There is also an elected township fiscal officer, who serves a four-year term beginning on April 1 of the year after the election, which is held in November of the year before the presidential election. Vacancies in the fiscal officership or on the board of trustees are filled by the remaining trustees.

== Public services ==
The Wapakoneta City School District encompasses a large part of the township, with small portions in the southeast served by the Jackson Center Local School District and the Indian Lake Local School District. The extreme northeastern section of the township is served by the Waynesfield-Goshen Local School District.

Most of the township is served by the Wapakoneta (45895) post office, except for a small section in the south served by the Jackson Center (45334) post office.
