= Moulton, Ohio =

Unincorporated community in Ohio, U.S.

Coordinates: 40°33′22″N 84°17′50″W

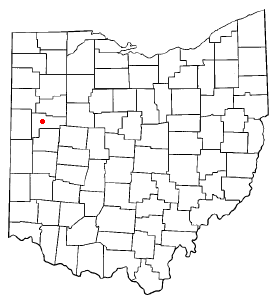
Location of Moulton, Ohio

Moulton is an unincorporated community located in southern Moulton Township, Auglaize County, Ohio, United States.

It is located along U.S. Route 33 between Wapakoneta and Saint Marys. The original two-lane stretch of U.S. Highway 33, now County Road 33-A, runs through the community. Moulton is served by the Saint Marys City School District and the Wapakoneta (45895) post office.

The Toledo and Ohio Central Railway, later merged into the New York Central, operated a line from Columbus, through Russells Point, Gutman, Wapakoneta and to its terminus in Saint Marys, that ran through Moulton, which also served the now defunct Detjen Grain Company. This line was abandoned by New York Central's successor Penn Central and subsequently with the formation of Conrail.

Former FM station WERM, later WAXC, WZOQ and now WFGF (now based in Lima) had its studio located in Moulton in a small A-frame brick house on County Rd. 33-A. Moulton Gas, a local propane business is also based in Moulton.
