= Wapakoneta City School District =

School district in Ohio, United States

Address
- 1102 Gardenia Drive Wapakoneta, Ohio, 45895; United States

District information
- Type: Public
- Grades: PK–12
- Schools: 5
- NCES District ID: 3904498

Students and staff
- Students: 2,786 (2025–2026)
- Teachers: 140.90 (on an FTE basis) (2025–2026)
- Staff: 271.25 (on an FTE basis) (2025–2026)
- Student–teacher ratio: 19.77 (2025–2026)

Other information
- Website: www.wapak.org

The Wapakoneta City School District is a public school district in Auglaize County, Ohio, United States.

The district encompasses the city of Wapakoneta; the villages of Buckland and Cridersville, the unincorporated communities of Fryburg, Saint Johns, and Uniopolis; Duchouquet Township; as well as parts of Clay, Logan, Moulton, Pusheta, Union, and Washington Townships. The district enrolls approximately 3,000 students.

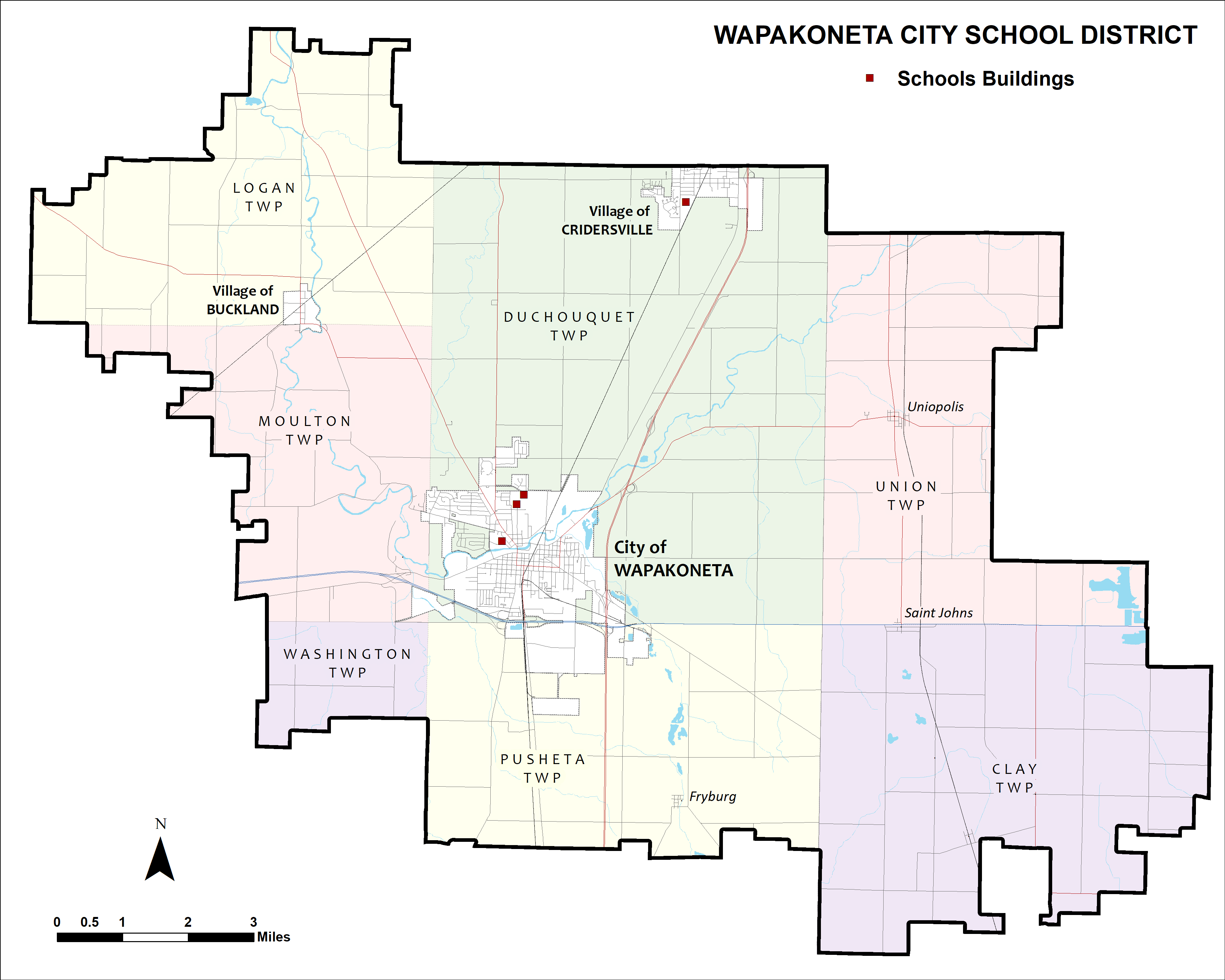

== Schools ==
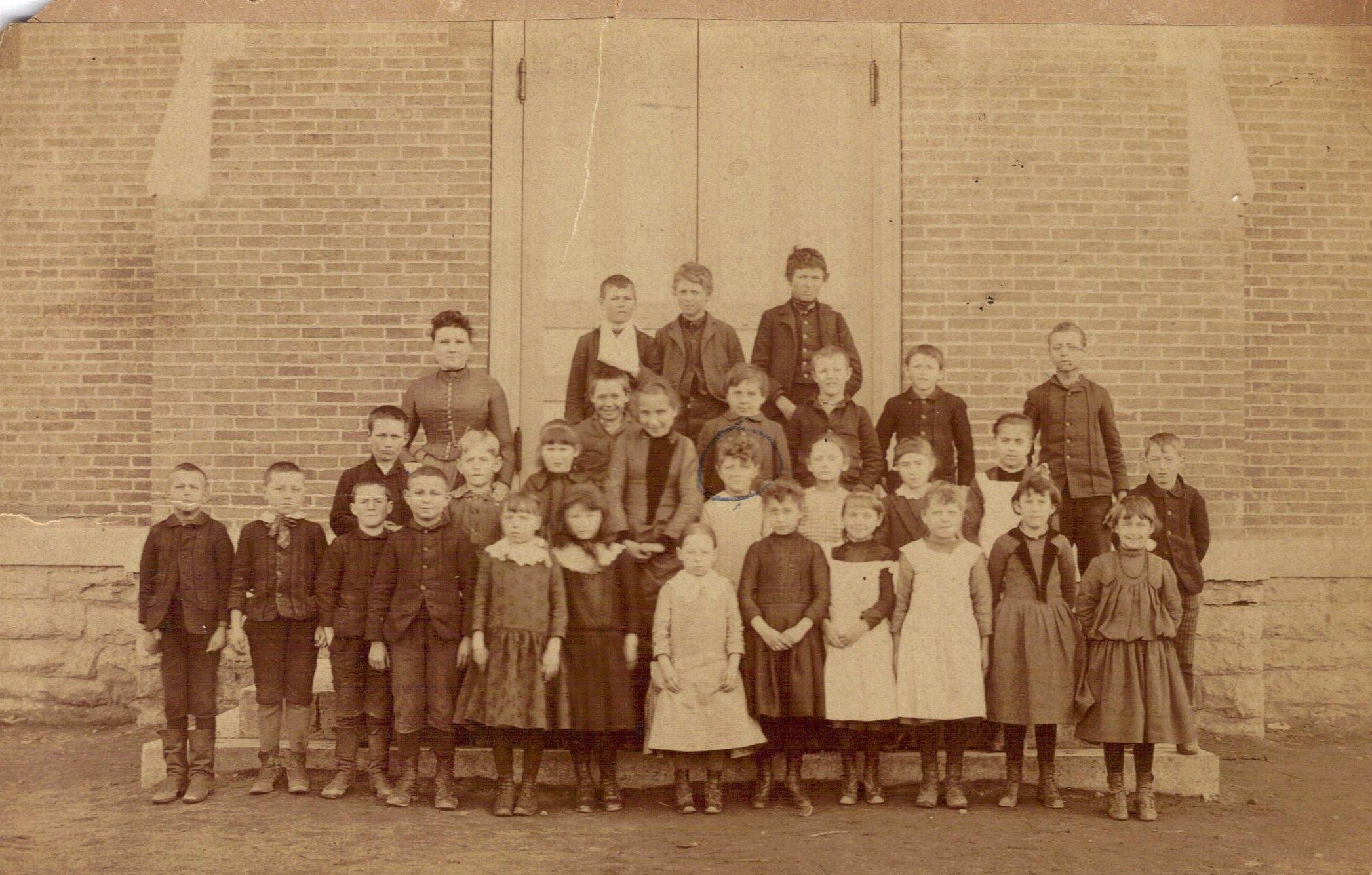
3rd Room Williamson School, Wapakoneta, OH 1888

The district operates the following schools.

- Wapakoneta High School
- Wapakoneta Middle School
- Wapakoneta Elementary School, Wapakoneta
- Cridersville Elementary School, Cridersville

The district previously operated Blume High School in Wapakoneta. After Wapakoneta High School opened in 1959, the Blume building was used as a junior high school until it was closed in 1990.

After qualifying for an OSFC grant, Wapakoneta City Schools constructed two new elementaries. This brought the closing of Northridge Elementary, Centennial Elementary and the original Cridersville school (most recently an elementary). The building project also included the construction of a performing arts center to the existing Wapakoneta High School.
