= Geyer, Ohio =

Unincorporated community in Ohio, U.S.

Coordinates: 40°30′34″N 84°3′50″W

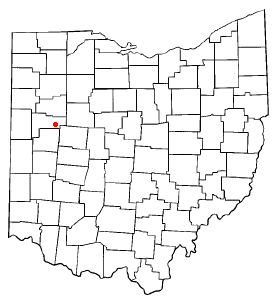
Location of Geyer, Ohio

Geyer is an unincorporated community in southwestern Clay Township, Auglaize County, Ohio, United States.

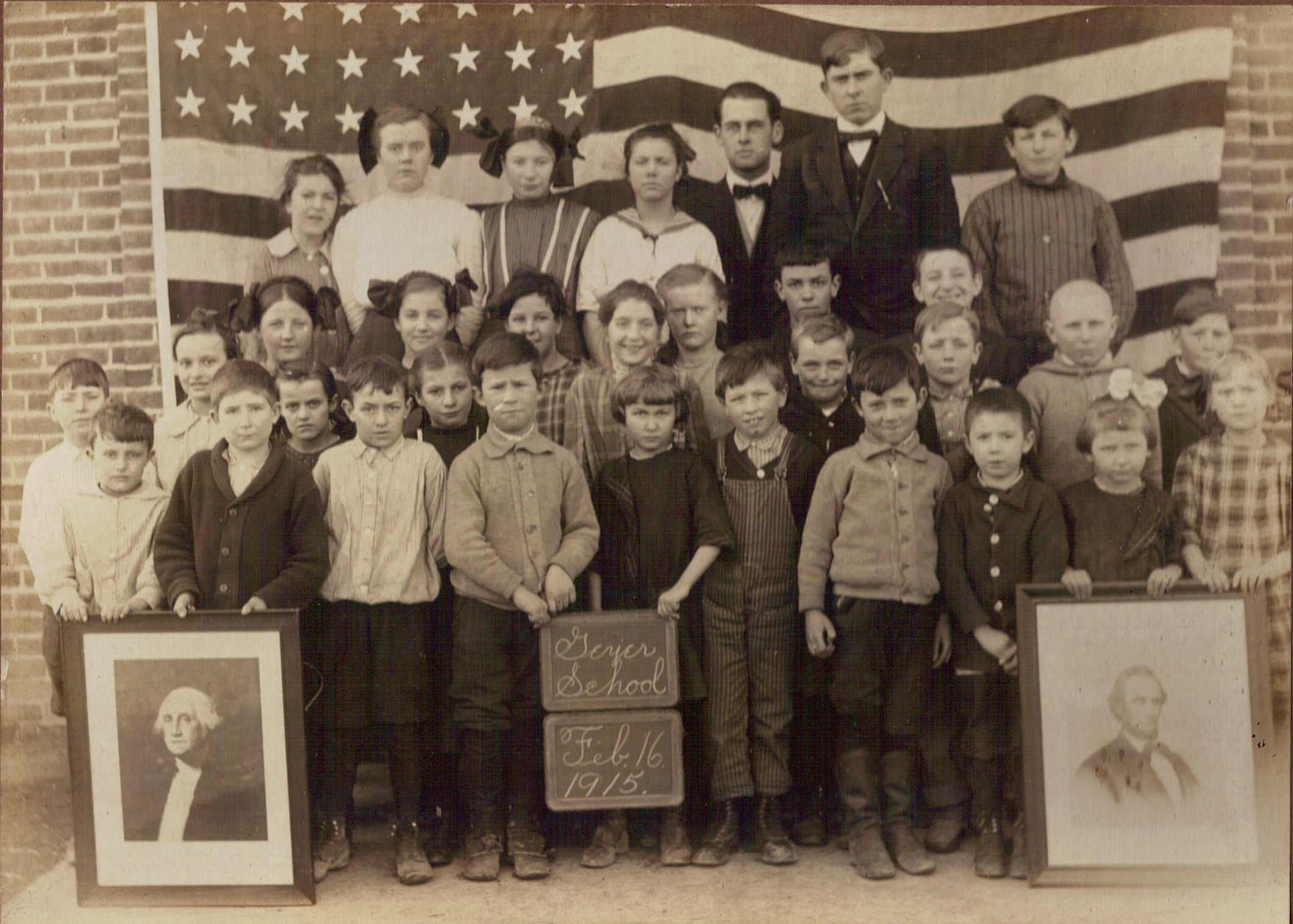
The 1915 class at Geyer School

Geyer is located southeast of Wapakoneta and north of Jackson Center. The community is served by the Wapakoneta City School District and the Wapakoneta (45895) post office.

Geyer was laid out in 1893 by George Geyer, and named for him. The village was incorporated in 1900, but surrendered its incorporated status in 1918.

A post office was established at Geyer in 1894, and remained in operation until 1911.
