= Cridersville, Ohio =

- Village
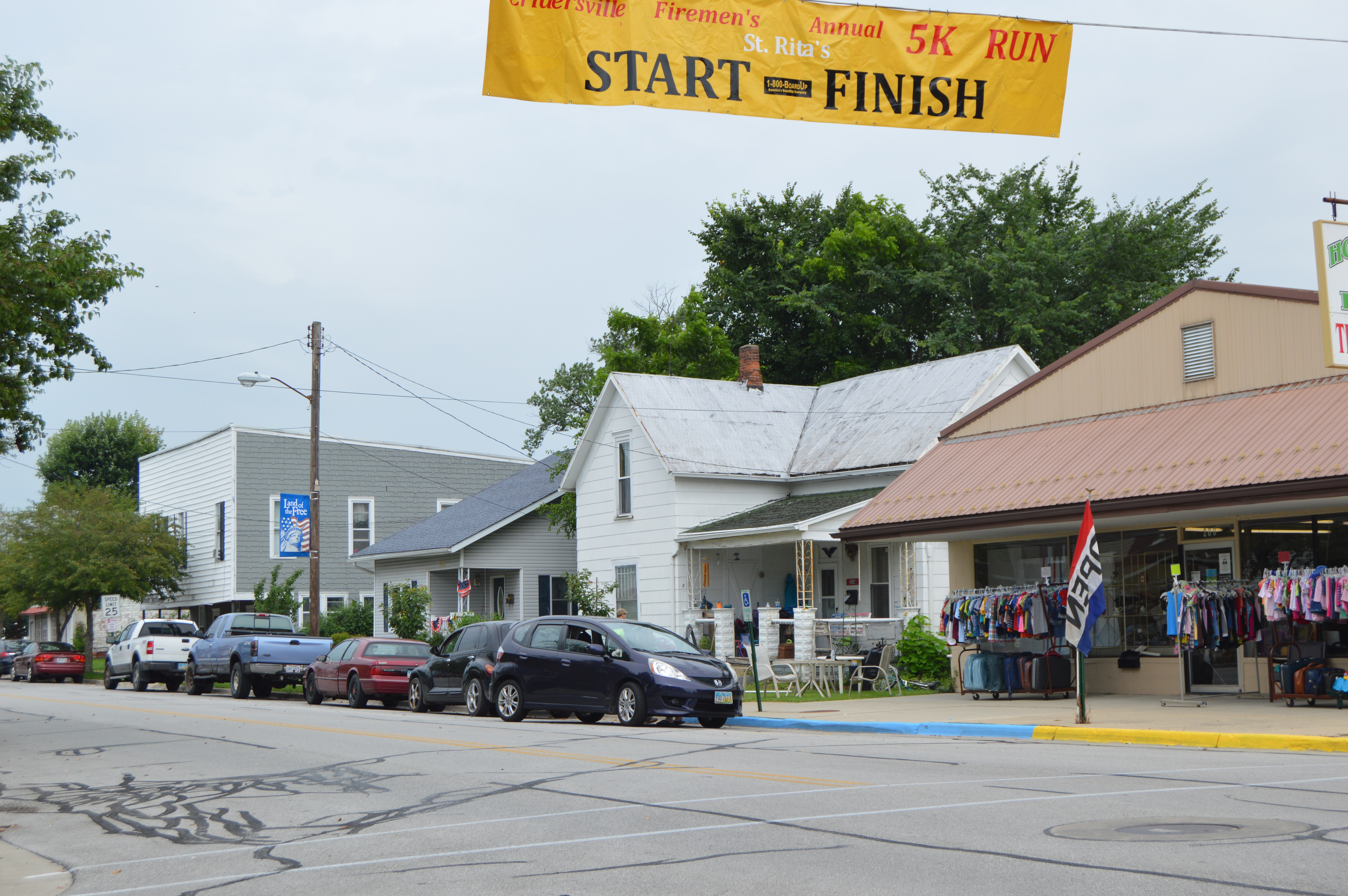
- Main Street

- Seal

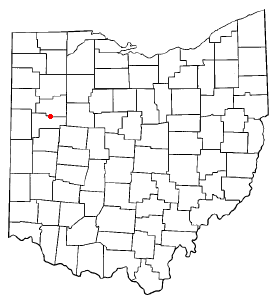
- Location of Cridersville, Ohio

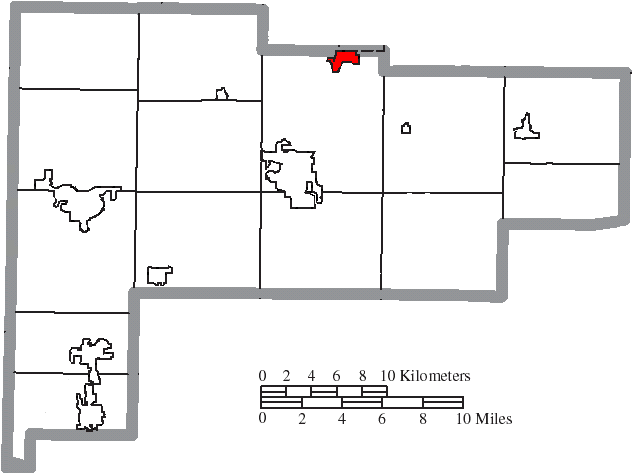
- Location of Cridersville in Auglaize County
- Coordinates: 40°39′53″N 84°07′51″W
- Country: United States
- State: Ohio
- County: Auglaize
- Township: Duchouquet

Area
  - Total: 1.20 sq mi (3.11 km^{2})
  - Land: 1.20 sq mi (3.11 km^{2})
  - Water: 0 sq mi (0.00 km^{2})
- Elevation: 902 ft (275 m)

Population (2020)
  - Total: 1,791
  - Estimate (2023): 1,746
  - Density: 1,492.4/sq mi (576.21/km^{2})
- Time zone: UTC-5 (Eastern (EST))
  - Summer (DST): UTC-4 (EDT)
- ZIP code: 45806
- Area code: 419
- FIPS code: 39-19400
- GNIS feature ID: 2398652
- Website: villageofcridersville.com

Cridersville (/ˈkraɪdərzvɪl/ KRY-dərz-vil) is a village in Auglaize County, Ohio, United States. The population was 1,791 at the 2020 census. It is included in the Wapakoneta, Ohio Micropolitan Statistical Area.

== Geography ==
The village is located about halfway between the cities of Lima and Wapakoneta. It is located in Duchouquet Township and is adjacent to Shawnee Township in Allen County.

According to the United States Census Bureau, the village has a total area of 0.90 square miles (2.33 km^{2}), all land.

== Demographics ==
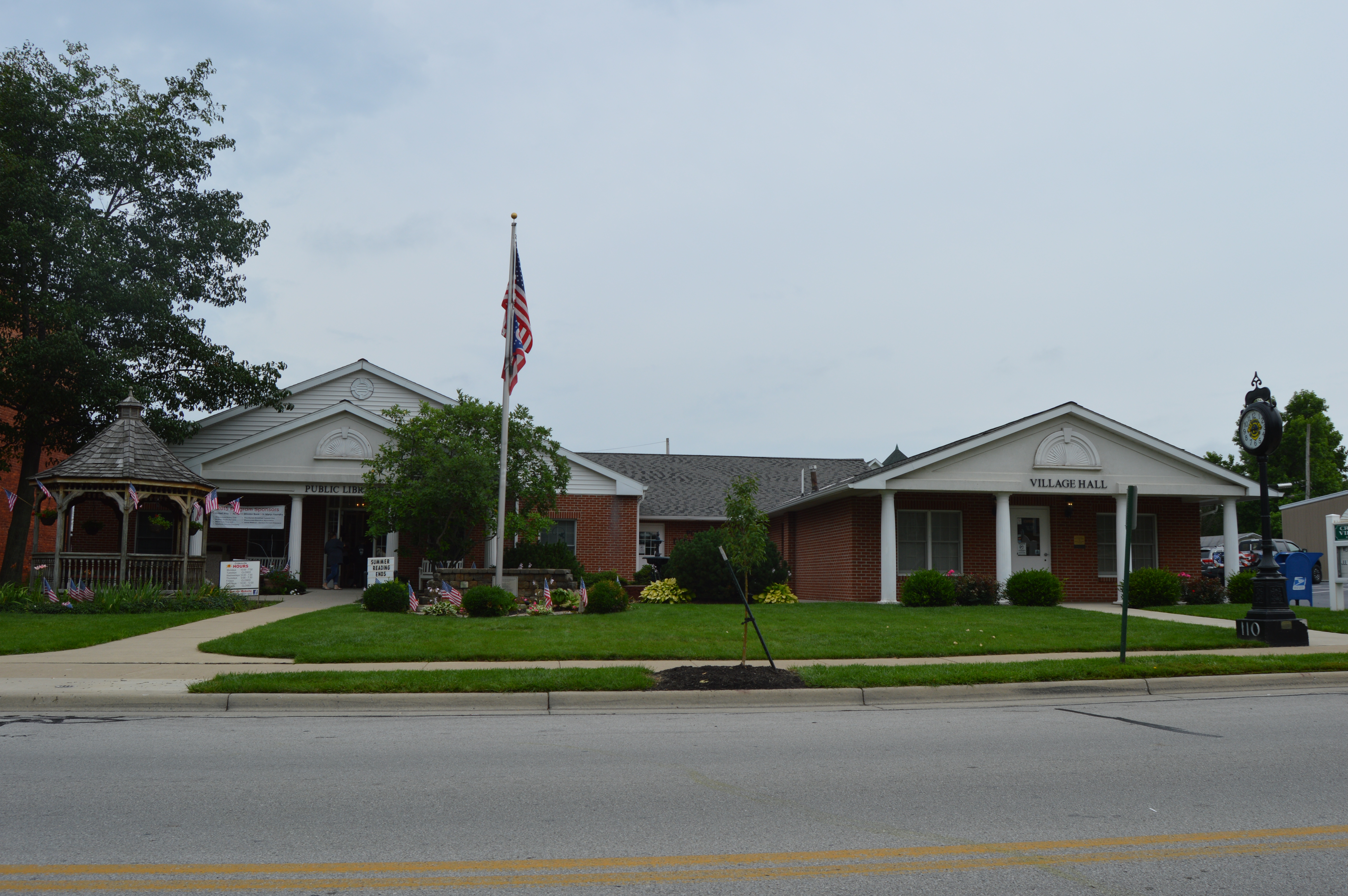
Cridersville library and village hall

Historical population
Census	Pop.	Note	%±
1870	167		—
1880	260		55.7%
1890	465		78.8%
1900	581		24.9%
1910	526		−9.5%
1920	493		−6.3%
1930	559		13.4%
1940	581		3.9%
1950	684		17.7%
1960	1,053		53.9%
1970	1,103		4.7%
1980	1,843		67.1%
1990	1,885		2.3%
2000	1,817		−3.6%
2010	1,852		1.9%
2020	1,791		−3.3%
2023 (est.)	1,746	▼	−2.5%
U.S. Decennial Census

=== 2010 census ===
As of the census of 2010, there were 1,852 people, 766 households, and 482 families living in the village. The population density was 2,057.8 inhabitants per square mile (794.5/km^{2}). There were 807 housing units at an average density of 896.7 per square mile (346.2/km^{2}). The racial makeup of the village was 98.3% White, 0.4% African American, 0.1% Native American, 0.1% from other races, and 1.2% from two or more races. Hispanic or Latino of any race were 1.6% of the population.

There were 766 households, of which 31.5% had children under the age of 18 living with them, 46.2% were married couples living together, 11.7% had a female householder with no husband present, 5.0% had a male householder with no wife present, and 37.1% were non-families. 33.0% of all households were made up of individuals, and 19.4% had someone living alone who was 65 years of age or older. The average household size was 2.32 and the average family size was 2.92.

The median age in the village was 41.8 years. 24.4% of residents were under the age of 18; 8.2% were between the ages of 18 and 24; 22.3% were from 25 to 44; 24.2% were from 45 to 64; and 20.8% were 65 years of age or older. The gender makeup of the village was 46.6% male and 53.4% female.

=== 2000 census ===
As of the census of 2000, there were 1,817 people, 732 households, and 508 families living in the village. The population density was 1,992.8 inhabitants per square mile (769.4/km^{2}). There were 764 housing units at an average density of 837.9 per square mile (323.5/km^{2}). The racial makeup of the village was 96.42% White, 0.50% African American, 0.22% Native American, 0.06% Asian, 0.39% from other races, and 2.42% from two or more races. Hispanic or Latino of any race were 2.37% of the population.

There were 732 households, out of which 32.8% had children under the age of 18 living with them, 53.4% were married couples living together, 12.7% had a female householder with no husband present, and 30.6% were non-families. 27.7% of all households were made up of individuals, and 13.3% had someone living alone who was 65 years of age or older. The average household size was 2.43 and the average family size was 2.94.

In the village, the population was spread out, with 27.1% under the age of 18, 8.0% from 18 to 24, 25.6% from 25 to 44, 21.8% from 45 to 64, and 17.5% who were 65 years of age or older. The median age was 37 years. For every 100 females there were 86.0 males. For every 100 females age 18 and over, there were 78.6 males.

The median income for a household in the village was $32,113, and the median income for a family was $36,653. Males had a median income of $32,337 versus $21,902 for females. The per capita income for the village was $15,768. About 10.5% of families and 12.3% of the population were below the poverty line, including 22.4% of those under age 18 and 2.5% of those age 65 or over.

== Education ==
The village is served by the Wapakoneta City School District. Cridersville has a public library, a branch of the Auglaize County Public Library.
