= Santa Fe, Ohio =

- Unincorporated community
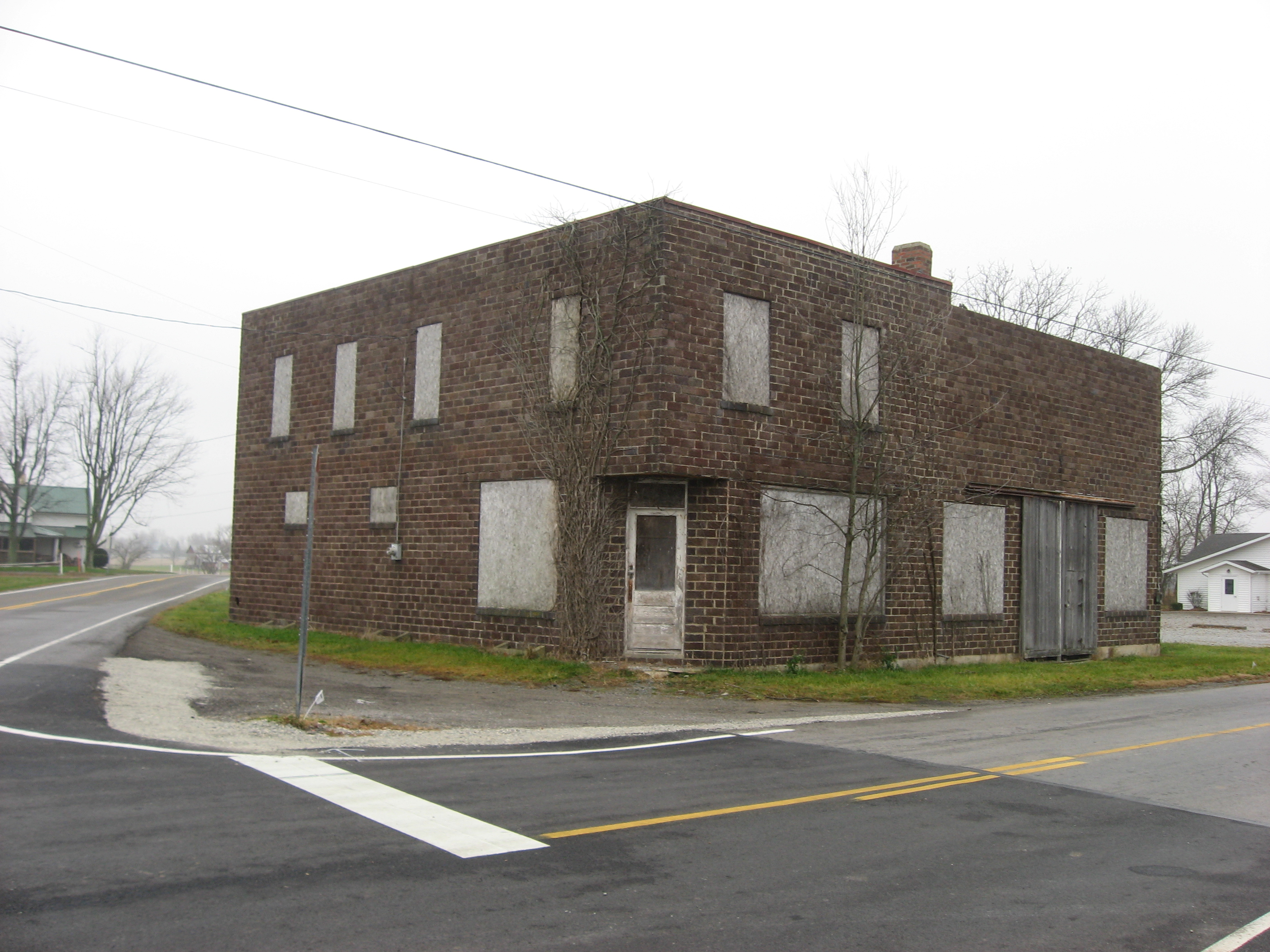
- Abandoned building in central Santa Fe

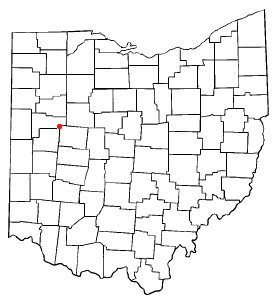
- Location of Santa Fe, Ohio
- Coordinates: 40°29′29″N 83°59′39″W
- Country: United States
- State: Ohio
- Counties: Auglaize, Logan
- Townships: Clay, Stokes
- Elevation: 1,007 ft (307 m)
- Time zone: UTC-5 (Eastern (EST))
  - Summer (DST): UTC-4 (EDT)
- GNIS feature ID: 1065287

Santa Fe is an unincorporated community located on the border of Clay Township in Auglaize County and Stokes Township in Logan County, in the west central part of the U.S. state of Ohio.

The community was named in commemoration of the Capture of Santa Fe in the Mexican–American War.

The community is served by the Indian Lake Local School District, the Wapakoneta (45895) post office in Auglaize County, and the Lakeview (43331) post office in Logan County.
