= Duchouquet Township, Ohio =

Township in Ohio, US

Duchouquet Township, Auglaize County, Ohio
- Township
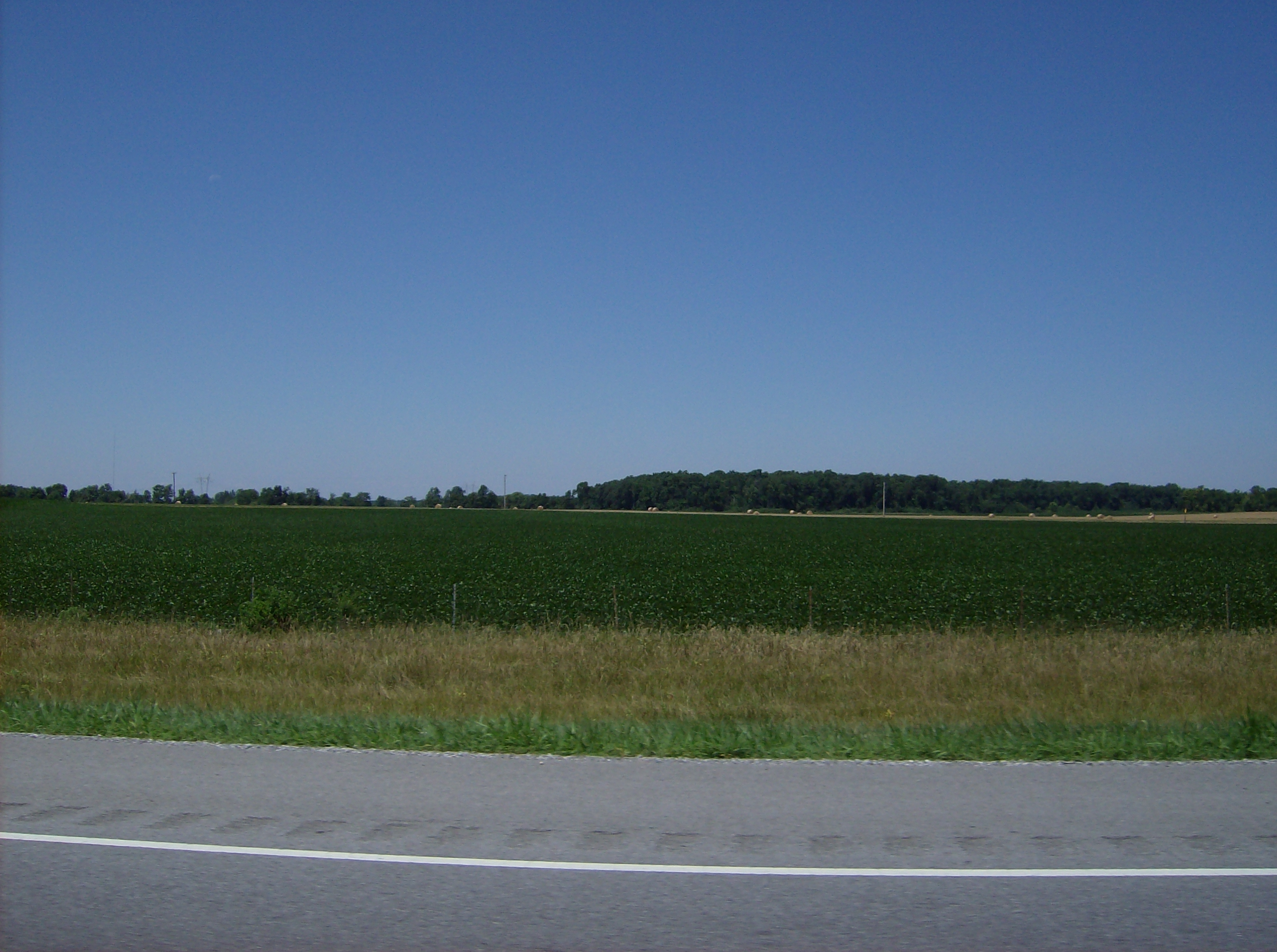
- Farmland along Interstate 75

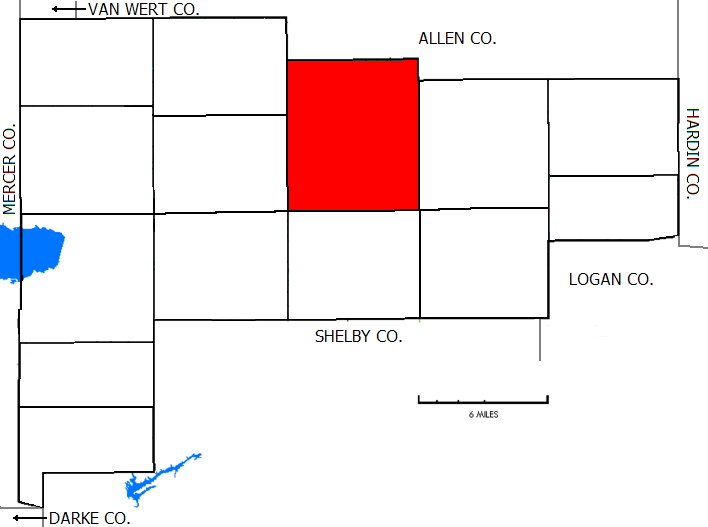
- Location of Duchouquet Township in Auglaize County
- Coordinates: 40°35′26″N 84°10′55″W
- Country: United States
- State: Ohio
- County: Auglaize

Area
  - Total: 42.3 sq mi (109.5 km^{2})
  - Land: 42.2 sq mi (109.2 km^{2})
  - Water: 0.077 sq mi (0.2 km^{2})
- Elevation: 925 ft (282 m)

Population (2020)
  - Total: 14,676
  - Density: 344/sq mi (132.8/km^{2})
- Time zone: UTC-5 (Eastern (EST))
  - Summer (DST): UTC-4 (EDT)
- FIPS code: 39-22722
- GNIS feature ID: 1085763
- Website: www.duchouquettownship.com

Duchouquet Township /duːˈʃɪkwɪt/ is one of the fourteen townships of Auglaize County, Ohio, United States. The 2020 census found 14,676 people in the township.

== Geography ==
Located in the northern part of the county, it borders the following townships:

- Shawnee Township, Allen County – north
- Perry Township, Allen County – northeast
- Union Township – east
- Clay Township – southeast corner
- Pusheta Township – south
- Washington Township – southwest corner
- Moulton Township – west
- Logan Township – northwest corner

Most of Wapakoneta, the largest city and county seat of Auglaize County, is located in southwestern Duchouquet Township, and the village of Cridersville is located in the township's northeast.

Duchouquet Township is the largest township in the county, containing forty-two whole sections, for a total area of 42.3 square miles (109.5 km^{2}). It is the largest township in the county, both in population and in area. The Auglaize River flows through the township.

== Name and history ==
Named for Francis Duchoquet, a French trapper who lived with local Shawnees, it is the only Duchouquet Township statewide.

A significant Council House was built in the area by the Shawnee, who arrived in the area after the Miami were forced out in the 1780s. This structure was a meeting place for the most prominent Native American leaders in the region, such as Blue Jacket, Captain Logan, Little Turtle, and Tecumseh. Meanwhile, the township was also the site of an early Quaker mission.

Duchouquet Township was formed on March 4, 1833, while still part of Allen County. After the creation of Auglaize County in 1848, six square miles that had previously been a part of Shawnee Township in Allen County were attached to northern Duchouquet Township.

== Government ==
The township is governed by a three-member board of trustees, who are elected in November of odd-numbered years to a four-year term beginning on the following January 1. Two are elected in the year after the presidential election and one is elected in the year before it. There is also an elected township fiscal officer, who serves a four-year term beginning on April 1 of the year after the election, which is held in November of the year before the presidential election. Vacancies in the fiscal officership or on the board of trustees are filled by the remaining trustees.

== Public services ==
The entire township is in the Wapakoneta City School District.

The southern sections of Duchouquet Township are served by the Wapakoneta post office (45895), with the northern section being served by the Cridersville branch of the Lima post office (45806).

Major highways include Interstate 75 which crosses the county from north to south, passing through both municipalities, and U.S. Route 33 which sits on the township's southern border and passes through Wapakoneta.
