= Union Township, Auglaize County, Ohio =

Township in Ohio, US

- Township
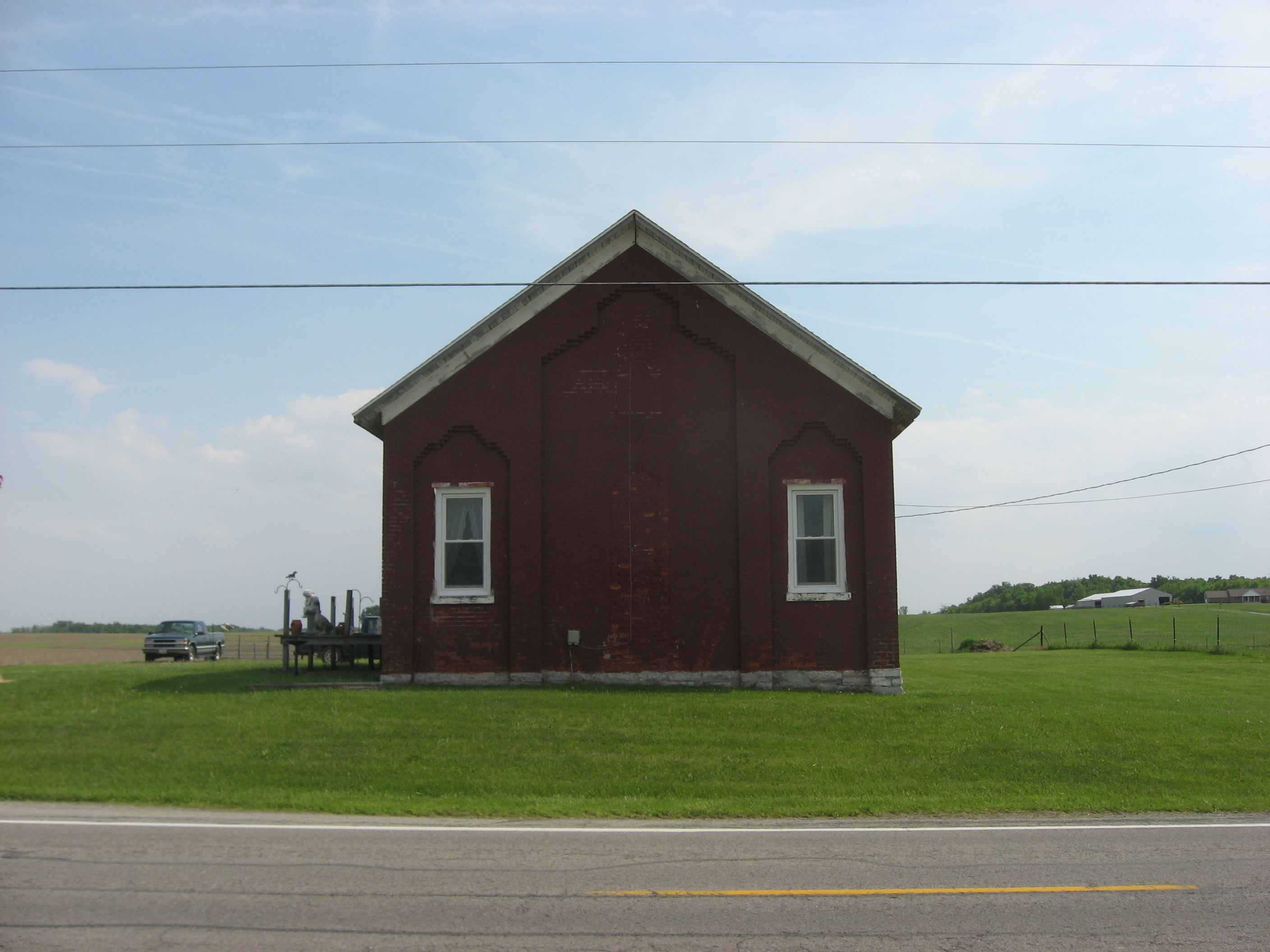
- Former school west of Waynesfield

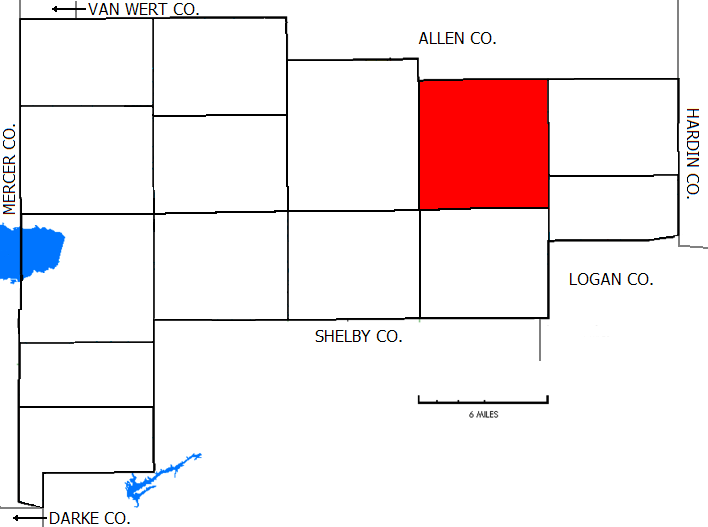
- Location of Union Township in Auglaize County
- Coordinates: 40°36′28″N 84°4′18″W
- Country: United States
- State: Ohio
- County: Auglaize

Area
  - Total: 35.9 sq mi (92.9 km^{2})
  - Land: 35.9 sq mi (92.9 km^{2})
  - Water: 0 sq mi (0.0 km^{2})
- Elevation: 955 ft (291 m)

Population (2020)
  - Total: 1,746
  - Density: 48.7/sq mi (18.8/km^{2})
- Time zone: UTC-5 (Eastern (EST))
  - Summer (DST): UTC-4 (EDT)
- FIPS code: 39-78204
- GNIS feature ID: 1085773

Union Township is one of the fourteen townships of Auglaize County, Ohio, United States. The 2020 census found 1,746 people in the township.

== Geography ==
Located in the northeastern part of the county, it borders the following townships:

- Perry Township, Allen County – north
- Auglaize Township, Allen County – northeast corner
- Wayne Township – east
- Goshen Township – southeast
- Clay Township – south
- Pusheta Township – southwest corner
- Duchouquet Township – west

The unincorporated communities of Saint Johns and Uniopolis lie in the township's west and southwest respectively.

According to the U.S. Census Bureau, the township has an area of 35.9 square miles (92.9 km^{2}).

== Name and history ==
It is one of twenty-seven Union Townships statewide.

The township was formed in 1836, while still part of Allen County. One of its earliest settlers was Hugh T. Rinehart, who immigrated to the township in 1839. His house is still in existence; it has been designated a historic site.

== Government ==
The township is governed by a three-member board of trustees, who are elected in November of odd-numbered years to a four-year term beginning on the following January 1. Two are elected in the year after the presidential election and one is elected in the year before it. There is also an elected township fiscal officer, who serves a four-year term beginning on April 1 of the year after the election, which is held in November of the year before the presidential election. Vacancies in the fiscal officership or on the board of trustees are filled by the remaining trustees.

== Public services ==
The Wapakoneta City School District encompasses a large part of the township, with the eastern third served by the Waynesfield-Goshen Local School District.

Most of the township is served by the Wapakoneta (45895) post office, with the eastern third served by the Waynesfield (45896) post office. Uniopolis (45888) and Saint Johns (45884) maintain post offices.
