= Uniopolis, Ohio =

- Unincorporated community and Census-designated place
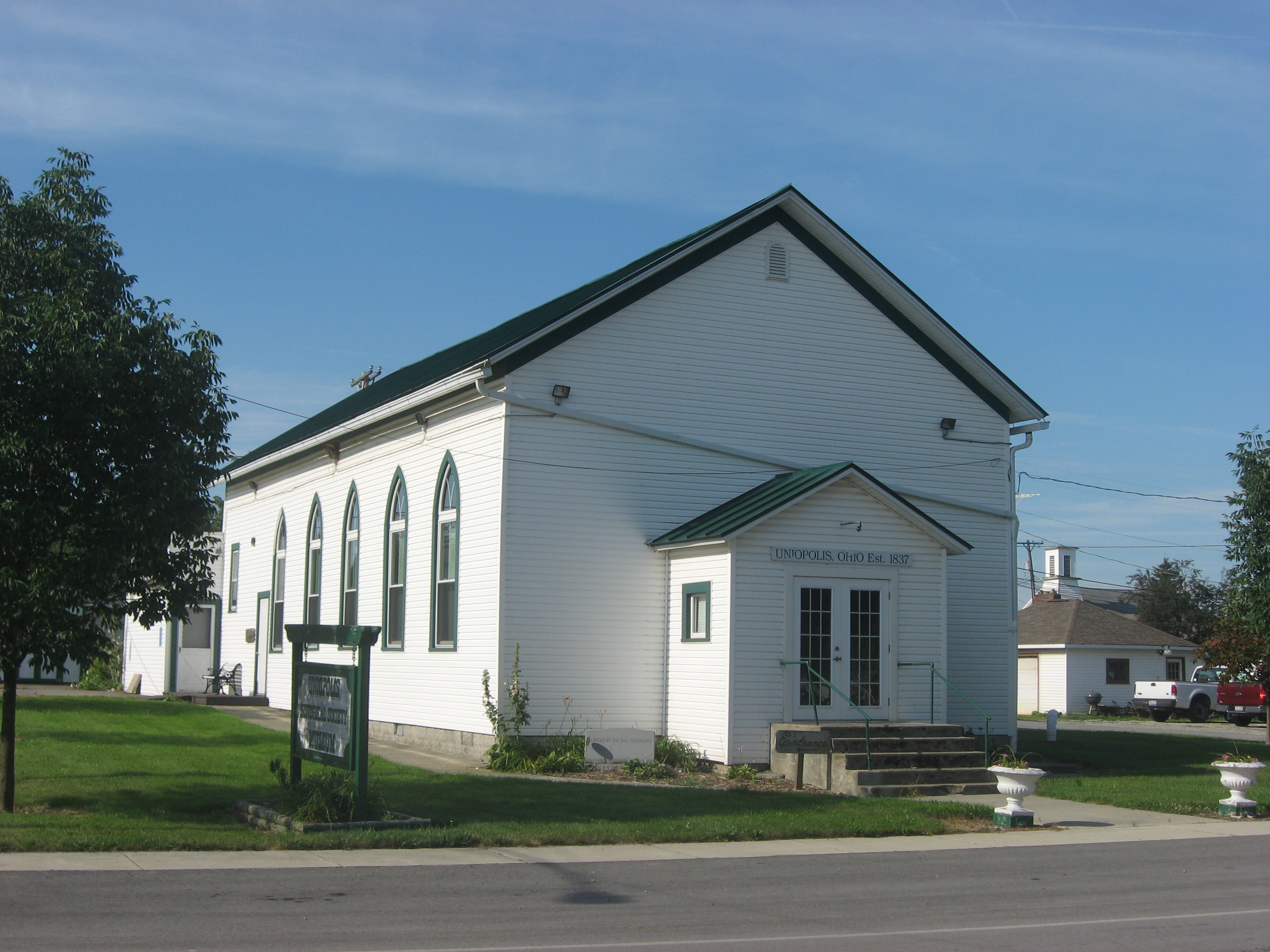
- Former village hall and now a museum

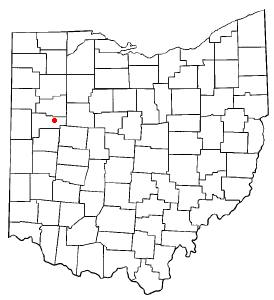
- Location of Uniopolis, Ohio

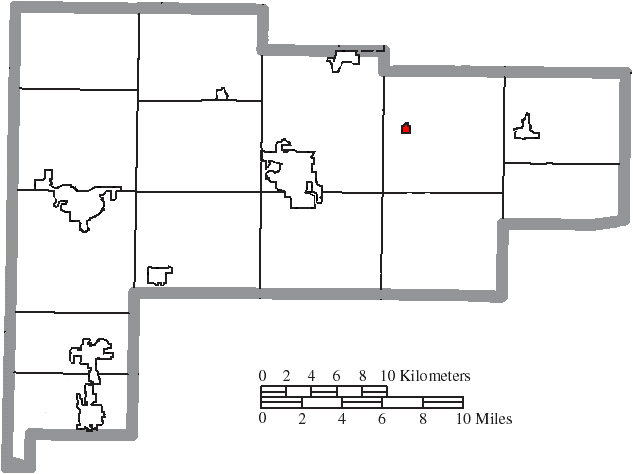
- Location of Uniopolis in Auglaize County
- Coordinates: 40°36′08″N 84°05′08″W
- Country: United States
- State: Ohio
- County: Auglaize
- Township: Union

Area
  - Total: 0.27 sq mi (0.69 km^{2})
  - Land: 0.27 sq mi (0.69 km^{2})
  - Water: 0 sq mi (0.00 km^{2})
- Elevation: 938 ft (286 m)

Population (2020)
  - Total: 188
  - Density: 707.5/sq mi (273.15/km^{2})
- Time zone: UTC-5 (Eastern (EST))
  - Summer (DST): UTC-4 (EDT)
- ZIP code: 45888
- Area code: 419
- FIPS code: 39-78848
- GNIS feature ID: 2785017

Uniopolis is an unincorporated community and former village in Auglaize County, Ohio, United States. The population was 188 at the 2020 census. It is included in the Wapakoneta, Ohio Micropolitan Statistical Area.

The community is served by the Wapakoneta City School District.

== History ==
Uniopolis was founded in 1837 and incorporated in 1900. In 2013, voters chose to disincorporate Uniopolis into Union Township.

Its village hall, now a museum, is listed on the National Register of Historic Places.

== Geography ==
According to the United States Census Bureau, the village had a total area of 0.16 square miles (0.41 km^{2}), all land.

== Demographics ==
Historical population
Census	Pop.	Note	%±
1880	116		—
1910	245		—
1920	193		−21.2%
1930	197		2.1%
1940	220		11.7%
1950	271		23.2%
1960	298		10.0%
1970	291		−2.3%
1980	259		−11.0%
1990	261		0.8%
2000	256		−1.9%
2010	222		−13.3%
2020	188		−15.3%
U.S. Decennial Census

=== 2010 census ===
As of the census of 2010, there were 222 people, 83 households, and 64 families living in the village. The population density was 1,387.5 inhabitants per square mile (535.7/km^{2}). There were 96 housing units at an average density of 600.0 per square mile (231.7/km^{2}). The racial makeup of the village was 100.0% White.

There were 83 households, of which 27.7% had children under the age of 18 living with them, 65.1% were married couples living together, 7.2% had a female householder with no husband present, 4.8% had a male householder with no wife present, and 22.9% were non-families. 16.9% of all households were made up of individuals, and 3.6% had someone living alone who was 65 years of age or older. The average household size was 2.67 and the average family size was 2.97.

The median age in the village was 41.5 years. 18.9% of residents were under the age of 18; 11.4% were between the ages of 18 and 24; 24% were from 25 to 44; 28.5% were from 45 to 64; and 17.6% were 65 years of age or older. The gender makeup of the village was 52.3% male and 47.7% female.

=== 2000 census ===
As of the census of 2000, there were 256 people, 88 households, and 77 families living in the village. The population density was 1,640.3 inhabitants per square mile (633.3/km^{2}). There were 93 housing units at an average density of 595.9 per square mile (230.1/km^{2}). The racial makeup of the village was 98.83% White, 0.39% African American, 0.39% Native American, and 0.39% from two or more races. Hispanic or Latino of any race were 1.17% of the population.

There were 88 households, out of which 44.3% had children under the age of 18 living with them, 71.6% were married couples living together, 10.2% had a female householder with no husband present, and 12.5% were non-families. 10.2% of all households were made up of individuals, and 3.4% had someone living alone who was 65 years of age or older. The average household size was 2.91 and the average family size was 3.08.

In the village the population was spread out, with 30.1% under the age of 18, 8.2% from 18 to 24, 31.6% from 25 to 44, 18.8% from 45 to 64, and 11.3% who were 65 years of age or older. The median age was 33 years. For every 100 females, there were 113.3 males. For every 100 females age 18 and over, there were 113.1 males.

The median income for a household in the village was $37,083, and the median income for a family was $38,750. Males had a median income of $30,909 versus $24,375 for females. The per capita income for the village was $16,099. None of the population or families were below the poverty line.
