= Pusheta Township, Auglaize County, Ohio =

Township in Ohio, US

- Township
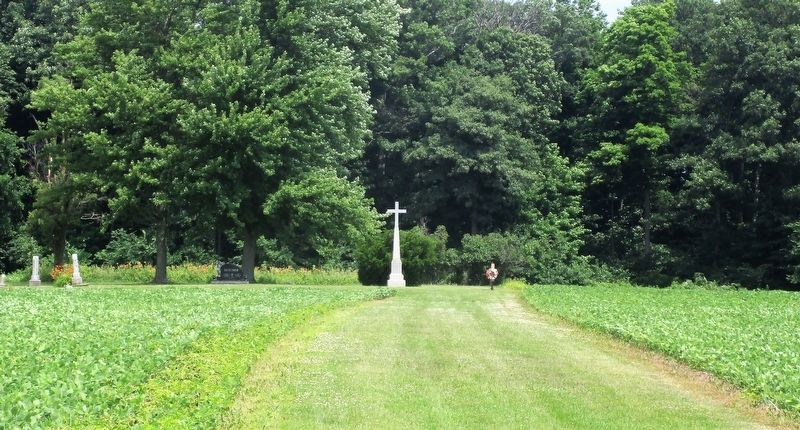
- St. Petersburg Parish 'Mother Church' Monument in Pusheta Township.

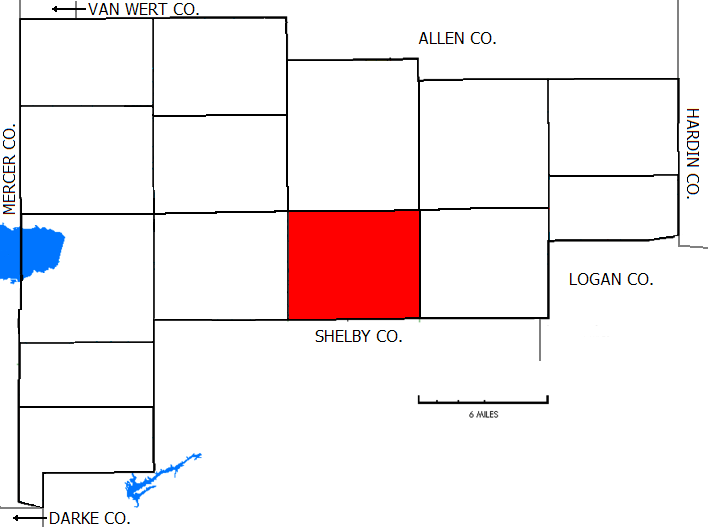
- Location of Pusheta Township in Auglaize County
- Coordinates: 40°31′8″N 84°10′1″W
- Country: United States
- State: Ohio
- County: Auglaize

Area
  - Total: 30.3 sq mi (78.6 km^{2})
  - Land: 30.3 sq mi (78.4 km^{2})
  - Water: 0.077 sq mi (0.2 km^{2})
- Elevation: 955 ft (291 m)

Population (2020)
  - Total: 1,269
  - Density: 41.9/sq mi (16.2/km^{2})
- Time zone: UTC-5 (Eastern (EST))
  - Summer (DST): UTC-4 (EDT)
- FIPS code: 39-65018
- GNIS feature ID: 1085770

Pusheta Township is one of the fourteen townships of Auglaize County, Ohio, United States. The 2020 census found 1,269 people in the township.

== Geography ==
Located in the southern part of the county, it borders the following townships:

- Duchouquet Township - north
- Union Township - northeast corner
- Clay Township - east
- Jackson Township, Shelby County - southeast corner
- Dinsmore Township, Shelby County - south
- Van Buren Township, Shelby County - southwest corner
- Washington Township - west
- Moulton Township - northwest corner

A small portion of Wapakoneta, the largest city and county seat of Auglaize County, is located in northwestern Pusheta Township, and the unincorporated community of Fryburg lies in the township's center.

According to the U.S. Census Bureau, Pusheta Township has a total area of 30.3 square miles (78.6 km^{2}), of which 30.3 square miles (78.4 km^{2}) is land and 0.077 square miles (0.2 km^{2}), or 0.30%, is water.

== Name and history ==
It is the only Pusheta Township statewide.

Formed in 1836, Pusheta Township was originally part of Allen County. The township takes its name from Pusheta Creek.

== Public services ==
The township is split between the Wapakoneta City School District in the north and east, Botkins Local Schools in the south, and New Knoxville Local Schools in the west.

The northern section of the township is served by the Wapakoneta (45895) post office, the western section by the New Knoxville (45871) post office, and the extreme southern section by the Botkins (45306) post office.

Major highways include Interstate 75, which crosses the county from north to south, and U.S. Route 33, which sits on the township's northern border.

== Government ==
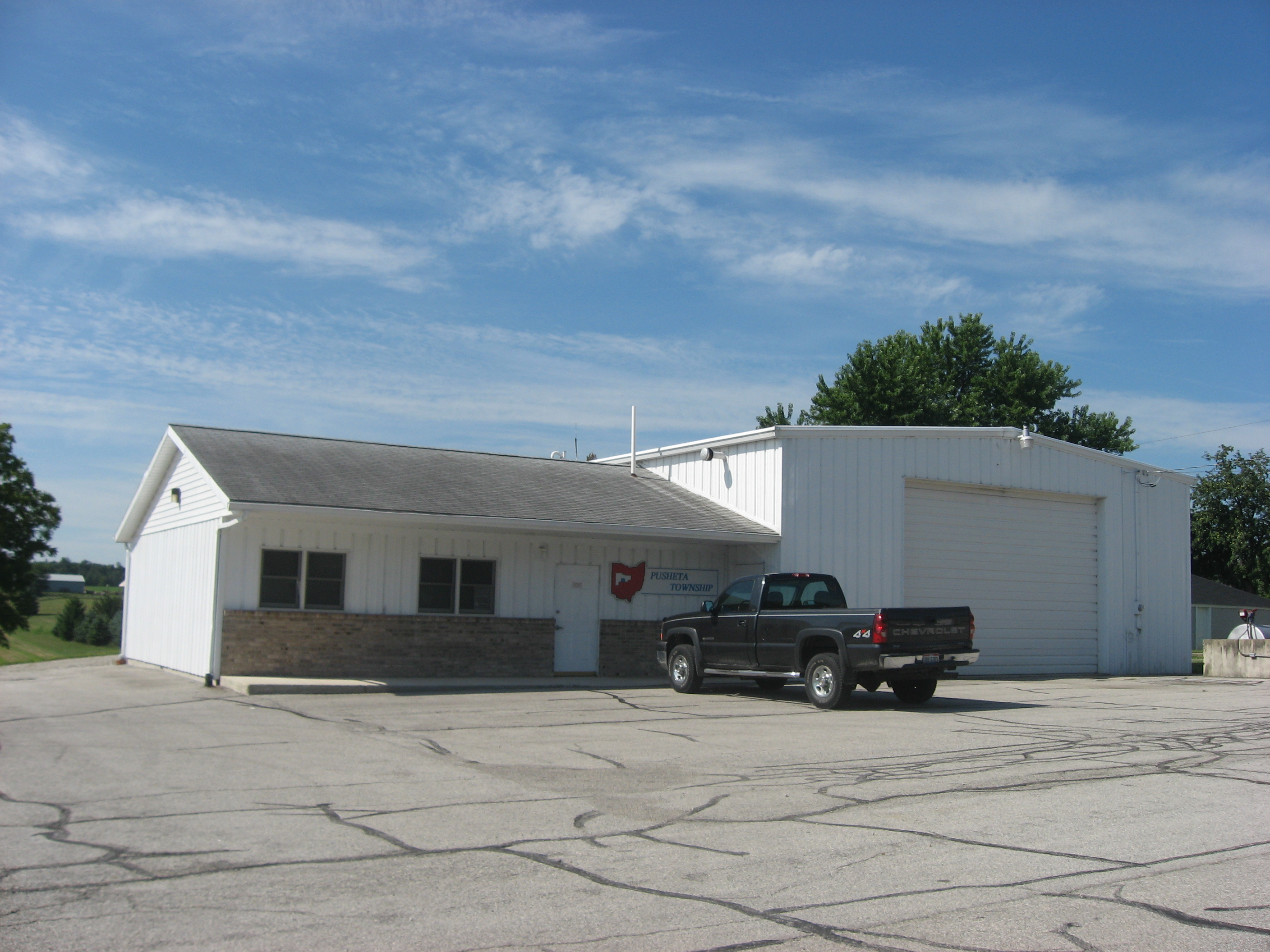
Pusheta Township Hall

The township is governed by a three-member board of trustees, who are elected in November of odd-numbered years to a four-year term beginning on the following January 1. Two are elected in the year after the presidential election and one is elected in the year before it. There is also an elected township fiscal officer, who serves a four-year term beginning on April 1 of the year after the election, which is held in November of the year before the presidential election. Vacancies in the fiscal officership or on the board of trustees are filled by the remaining trustees.
