= Adolph Boesel House =

Historic house in Ohio, United States

- U.S. National Register of Historic Places
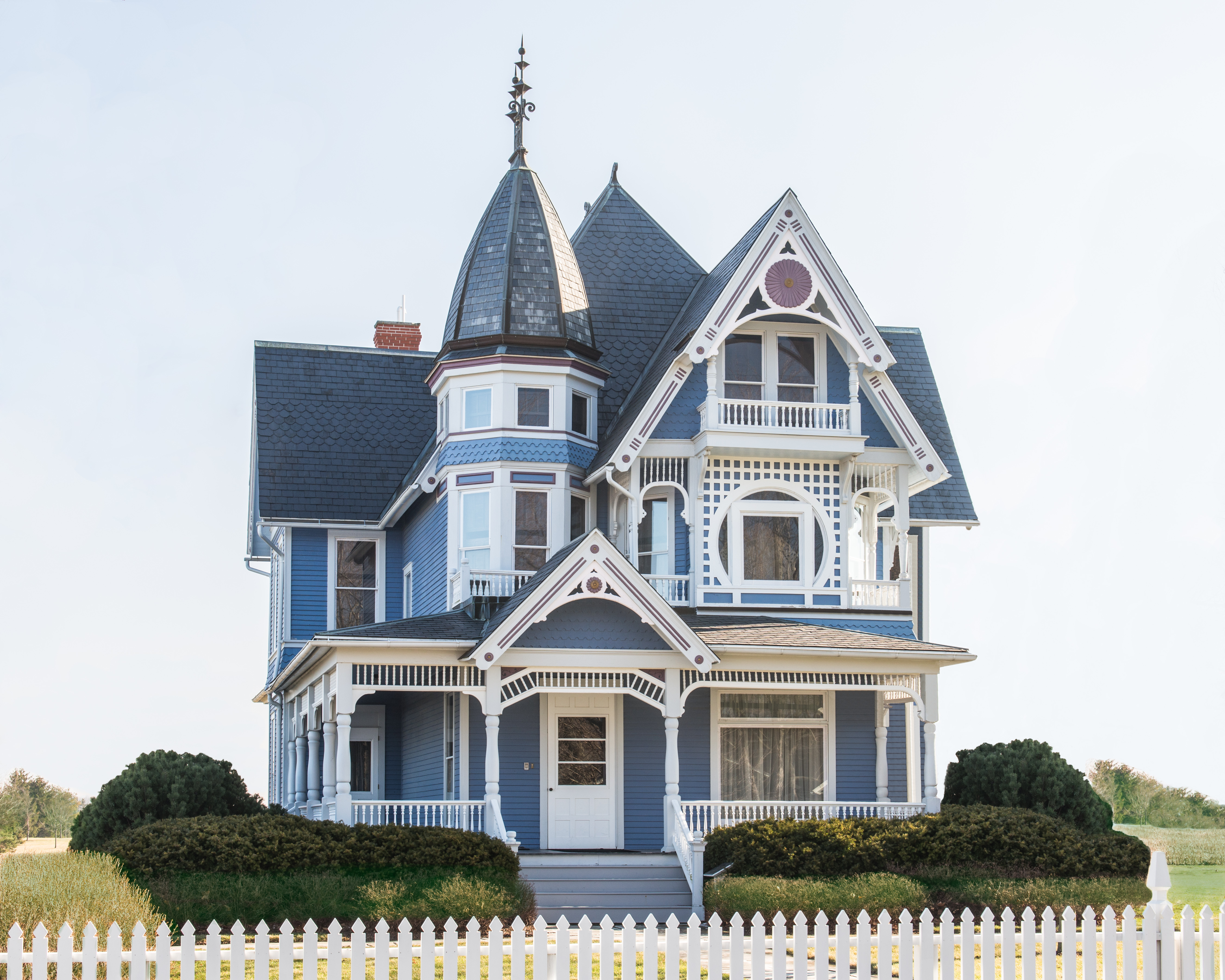
- Current site of the house at 400 Easthaven Dr.

- Location within Ohio Location within the United States
- Location: 110 S. Franklin St., New Bremen, Ohio
- Coordinates: 40°26′4″N 84°23′1″W
- Area: less than one acre
- Built: 1898
- Architectural style: Stick/Eastlake, Queen Anne
- NRHP reference No.: 79001784
- Added to NRHP: November 29, 1979

The Adolph Boesel House is a historic house in New Bremen, Ohio, United States. Built in 1898 in a combination of the Stick-Eastlake and Queen Anne styles of architecture, it was the home of a leading New Bremen citizen.

Beginning in the 1860s, the Boesel name was associated with banking in New Bremen. In 1866, Charles Boesel established a small bank in New Bremen that expanded throughout the nineteenth century. Despite a split in the business in 1905, the Boesels remained in control of the original corporation, which was soon renamed the "First City Bank of New Bremen." Adolph Boesel later became president of this corporation, which in 1923 maintained deposits of nearly $570,000. Adolph was the son of Jacob Boesel, a two-term member of the Ohio House of Representatives, who was Charles' oldest son. Besides serving the community as a banker for more than forty years, Boesel was a member of the local government, acting as the village's treasurer in 1905.

Boesel erected his house along Franklin Street on the village's western side in 1898; after he left the residence, it was the home of Alfred Rabe. A two-story structure with an attic, the house is a distinctive example of local architecture. In recognition of its place in local history, the Adolph Boesel House was listed on the National Register of Historic Places in 1979. Despite this honor, it was later classified as demolished by the Ohio Historical Society because the home was moved from its original location. A new house occupies its original address. The house remains listed on the National Register.
