= Moulton Township, Auglaize County, Ohio =

Township in Ohio, US

- Township
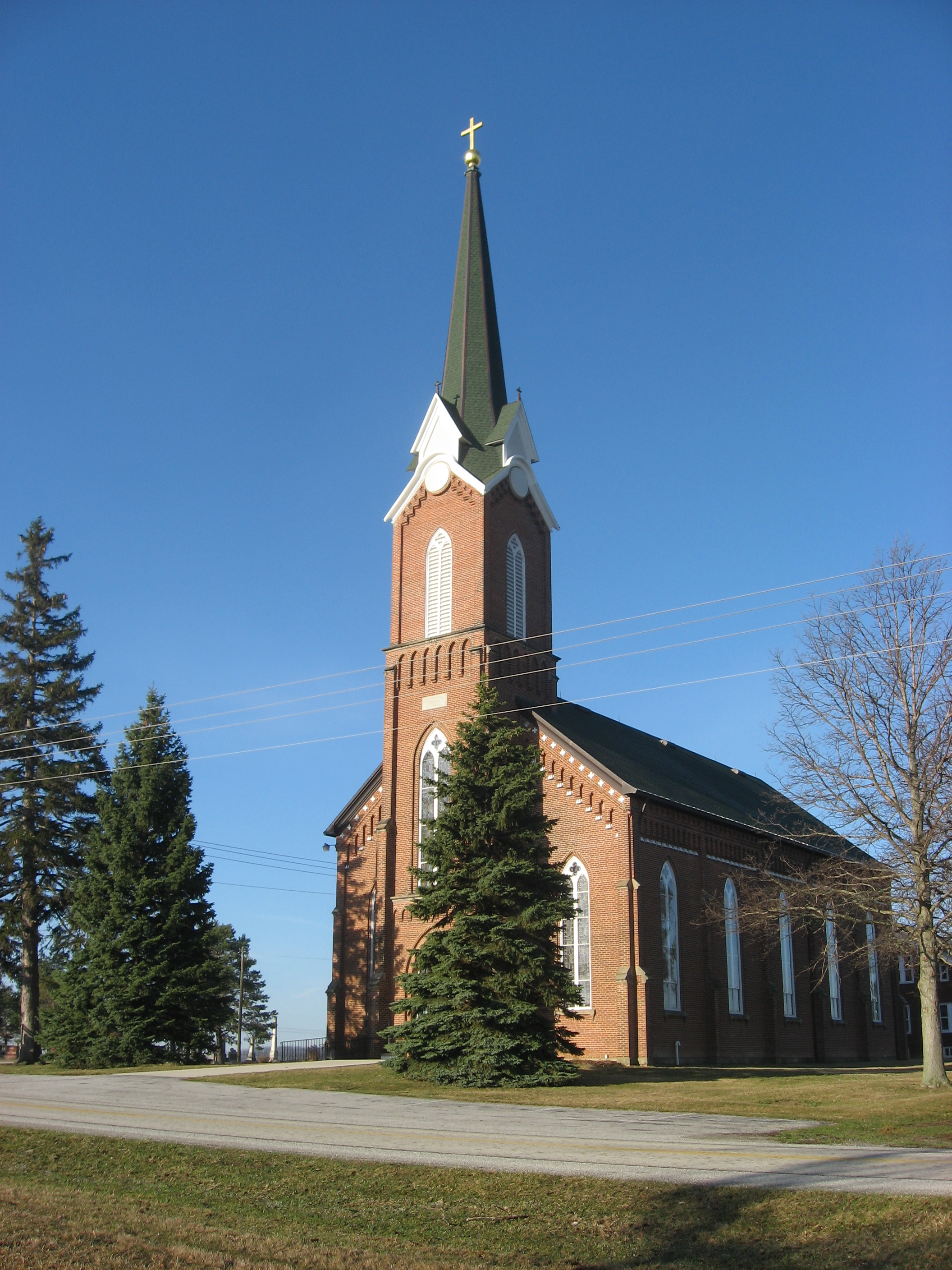
- St. Patrick's Catholic Church, a township landmark

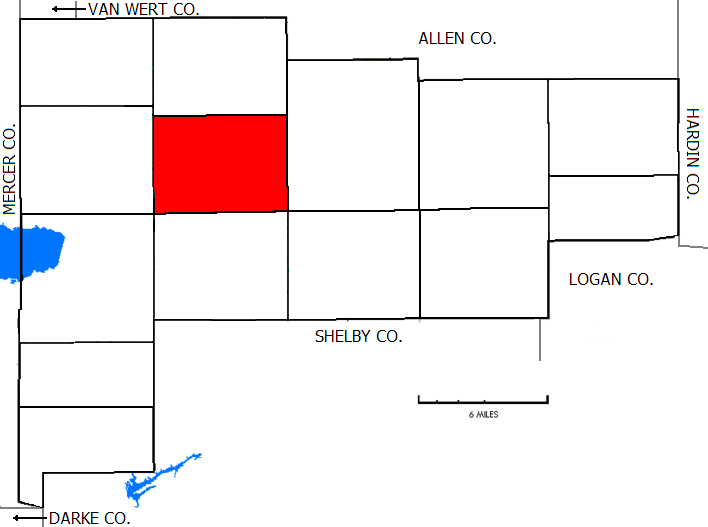
- Location of Moulton Township in Auglaize County
- Coordinates: 40°35′13″N 84°16′29″W
- Country: United States
- State: Ohio
- County: Auglaize

Area
  - Total: 27.9 sq mi (72.3 km^{2})
  - Land: 27.9 sq mi (72.2 km^{2})
  - Water: 0.039 sq mi (0.1 km^{2})
- Elevation: 866 ft (264 m)

Population (2020)
  - Total: 1,634
  - Density: 58.6/sq mi (22.6/km^{2})
- Time zone: UTC-5 (Eastern (EST))
  - Summer (DST): UTC-4 (EDT)
- FIPS code: 39-52472
- GNIS feature ID: 1085768

Moulton Township is one of the fourteen townships of Auglaize County, Ohio, United States. The 2020 census found 1,634 people in the township.

== Geography ==
Located in the west central part of the county, it borders the following townships:

- Logan Township - north
- Duchouquet Township - east
- Pusheta Township - southeast corner
- Washington Township - south
- Saint Marys Township - southwest corner
- Noble Township - west

A small corner of Wapakoneta, the largest city and county seat of Auglaize County, is located in far eastern Moulton Township. As well, the unincorporated communities of Glynwood and Moulton lie in the township's southwest and south respectively.

Moulton Township contains twenty whole sections and six half sections and has a total area of 27.9 square miles (72.3 km^{2}). It is crossed in the northeast corner by the Auglaize River.

== Name and history ==
It is the only Moulton Township statewide.

Organized in 1834, the township was originally a part of Allen County and included the southern part of Logan Township.

== Government ==
The township is governed by a three-member board of trustees, who are elected in November of odd-numbered years to a four-year term beginning on the following January 1. Two are elected in the year after the presidential election and one is elected in the year before it. There is also an elected township fiscal officer, who serves a four-year term beginning on April 1 of the year after the election, which is held in November of the year before the presidential election. Vacancies in the fiscal officership or on the board of trustees are filled by the remaining trustees.

== Public services ==
The township is split between the Wapakoneta City School District and the Saint Marys City School District.

The eastern section of the township is served by the Wapakoneta (45895) post office, the western section by the Saint Marys (45885) post office, and the northern section by the Buckland (45819) post office.

The major highway in Moulton Township is U.S. Route 33, which traverses the southern part of the township.
