= Uniopolis Town Hall =

- U.S. National Register of Historic Places
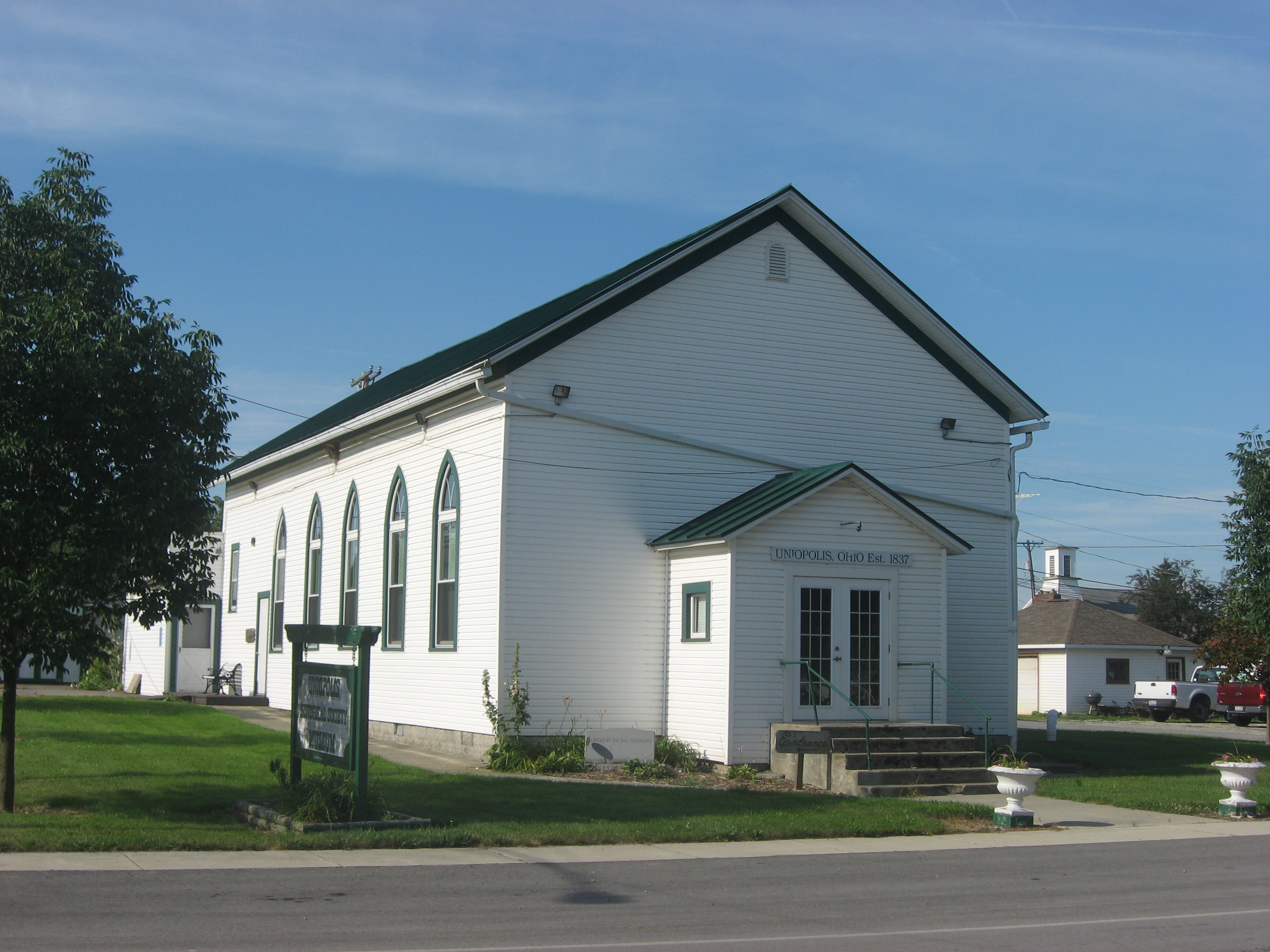
- Front of the town hall

- Location within Ohio Location within the United States
- Location: Ohio St. (State Route 67) east of its junction with Main St., Uniopolis, Ohio
- Coordinates: 40°36′8″N 84°5′15″W
- Area: less than one acre
- Built: 1875
- Architectural style: Gothic Revival
- NRHP reference No.: 94000773
- Added to NRHP: July 22, 1994

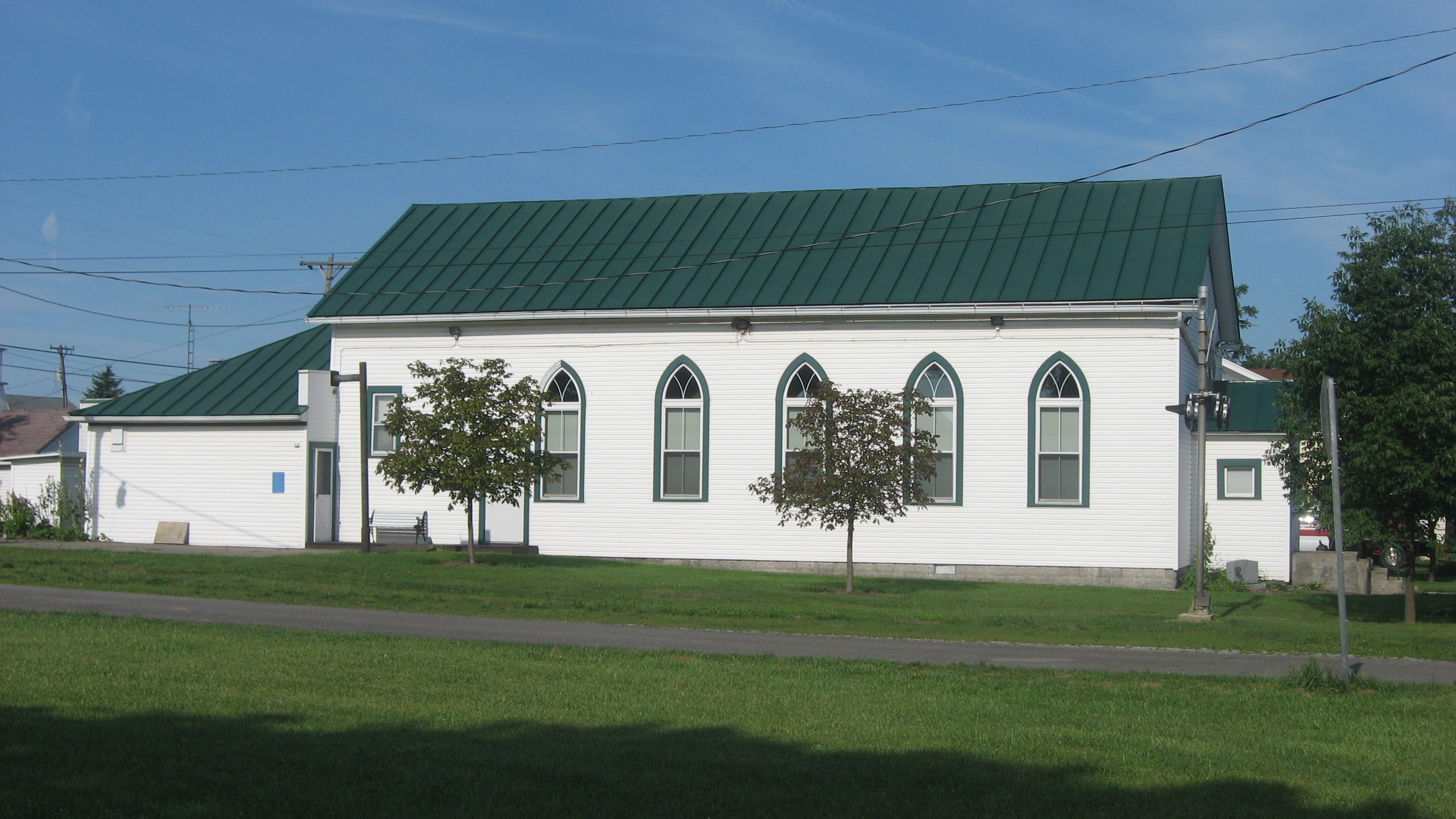
View of eastern side

The Uniopolis Town Hall is a historic village hall and museum in Uniopolis, Ohio, United States. Built in 1875, this Gothic Revival structure was built as a church, the Divinity Church of the United Brethren in Christ. The building ceased to be used for this purpose in 1900, when it was purchased by the village of Uniopolis and converted into a village hall. After more than ninety years of service as a village hall, the building began a process of conversion into the museum of the Uniopolis Historical Society.

The Uniopolis Town Hall is a simple Carpenter Gothic structure with five lancet windows on each side. Its weatherboarded walls rest upon a foundation of concrete and are topped with a roof of asphalt. As the Uniopolis municipal building, it has served a range of non-governmental purposes, including use as a community meeting room and as an auditorium. In recognition of its importance to the community, the village hall was listed on the National Register of Historic Places in 1994. Although it was built in 1875, its primary use as a community building means that its period of historic significance was deemed to have begun in 1900.
