= Auglaize County Courthouse =

Local government building in the United States

- U.S. National Register of Historic Places
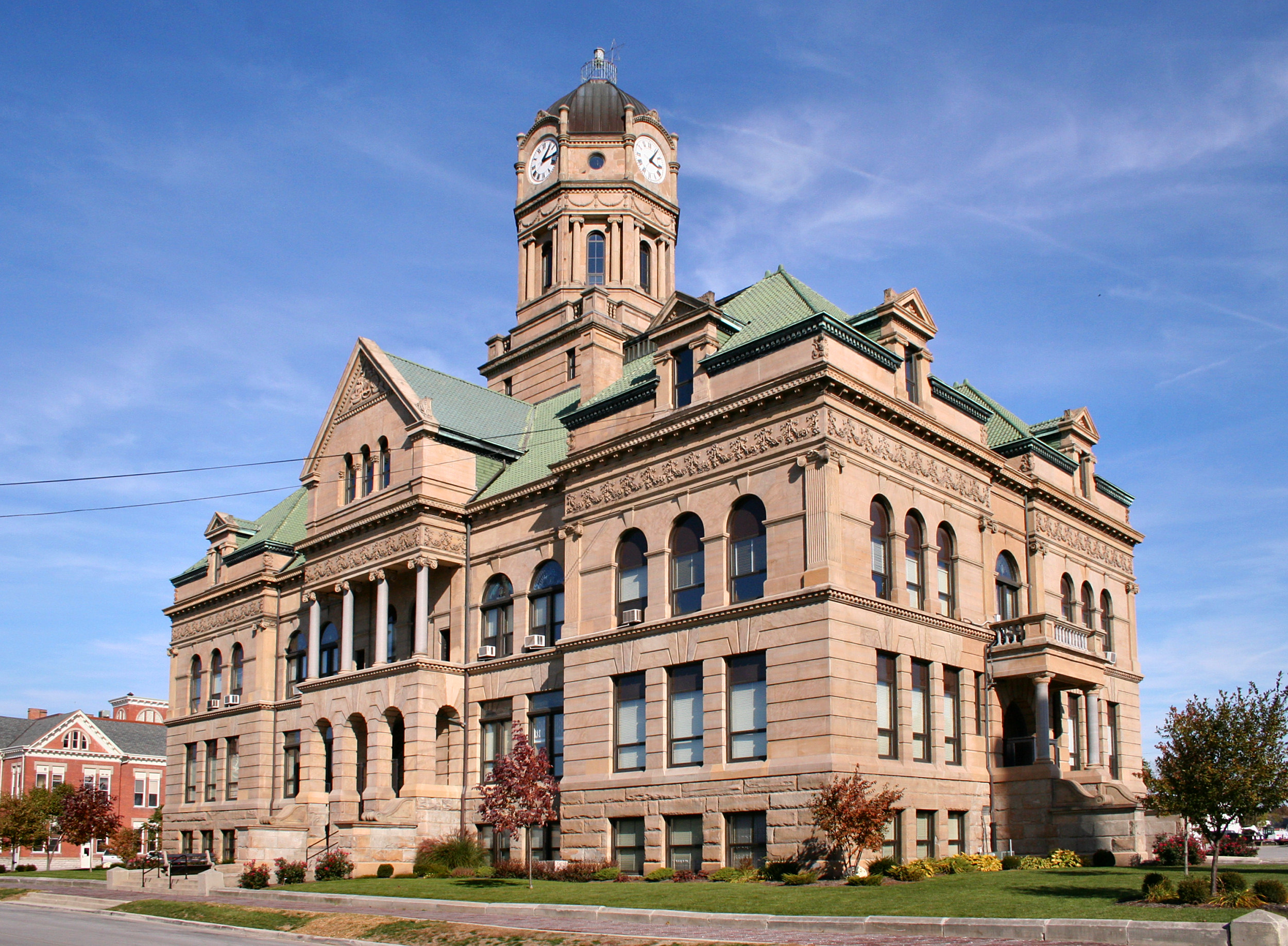
- Front of the courthouse

- Location within Ohio Location within the United States
- Interactive map showing the location of Auglaize County Courthouse
- Location: Courthouse Sq., Wapakoneta, Ohio
- Coordinates: 40°34′6″N 84°11′40″W
- Area: 1.5 acres (0.61 ha)
- Built: 1894
- Architect: Kremer & Hart; E.M. Campfield
- Architectural style: Italianate style
- NRHP reference No.: 73001387
- Added to NRHP: May 7, 1973

The Auglaize County Courthouse is located between West Mechanic, Willipie, West Pearl and Perry Streets in downtown Wapakoneta, Ohio, United States. Completed in 1894, it is listed on the National Register of Historic Places.

== History ==
Auglaize County was formed in 1848 and Wapakoneta was chosen by the voters as the county seat. This caused many bad feelings from St. Marys, the other choice for the county seat, as they had already planned an area for the courthouse along appropriately named Court Street.

The county's first courthouse was the Methodist Episcopal church. A frame building completed in 1834, it was used by the county in exchange for the free provision of a pulpit for the congregation. Until the county's first permanent courthouse was built in 1854, the courts rotated around the city's various churches, and the local government officials used rented rooms in buildings throughout Wapakoneta. The first purpose-built courthouse was a Greek Revival style structure of red brick and white trim window and door frames. Two Corinthian columns framed the entrance and supported a pedimented roof above. A rectangular drum rose above the roof which contained corinthian column supports and was capped with a dome with a spire.

A larger courthouse was needed and the county constructed a new courthouse in 1894. The courthouse was built with bonds authorized by the Ohio General Assembly, but changes to the plans more than doubled the cost. Renovation subtly changed the interior, such as an elevator, but the courthouse remains true to its original plans.

== Exterior ==
The current courthouse was constructed from 1893 to 1894 by the architectural firm Kremer & Hart. The building is built with local stone and has a rusticated base with smooth stone from the second floor up. The first floor has square windows in groups of three and blends into the second floor.

The second floor is the main floor and is illuminated by large rectangular windows. The entrance is a projection on the eastern facade and is reached by a flight of stairs, three large arches support a balcony above. The balcony contains four Corinthian columns supporting the gabled roof above. The other entrances are also reached by a flight of stairs to a covered porch with supportive Corinthian columns and a balcony with a balustrade. A frieze separates the second floor from the third. Large arched windows light the third floor with a decorative frieze beneath the roof.

The roof rises at various points to support a square drum with a central octagonal tower with a balustrade surrounding the base. Large arched windows are surrounded by Corinthian pilasters that support a decorative frieze and a four-face clock facing the cardinal points. The tower is capped by a dome with a central spire.

The tower was once graced with a statue of Justice overlooking the main entrance to the east. The community of St. Marys found this offensive, as they had the back of Justice to them and raised money to have her turned to the north. The statue was slowly deteriorating to a point where it had to be removed due to safety reasons. The only parts salvaged from the original Justice were the head, right hand, and sword.

In 1994, in time for the centennial of the courthouse, the Auglaize County Historical Society raised money to restore the statue through a project called "Copper Pennies for a Copper Lady" which raised over $25,000. The statue now stands in the Great Hall facing north, holding a sword in her right hand and the balances of justice in her left. The base of the pedestal contains a time capsule to be opened in 2094, one item being the names of the donors for the restoration of the statue.

On March 13, 2026 the roof was damaged and partially blown off by strong winds, which forced the Courthouse to be temporarily closed.
