= Wapakoneta, Ohio =

City in Ohio, US

- City
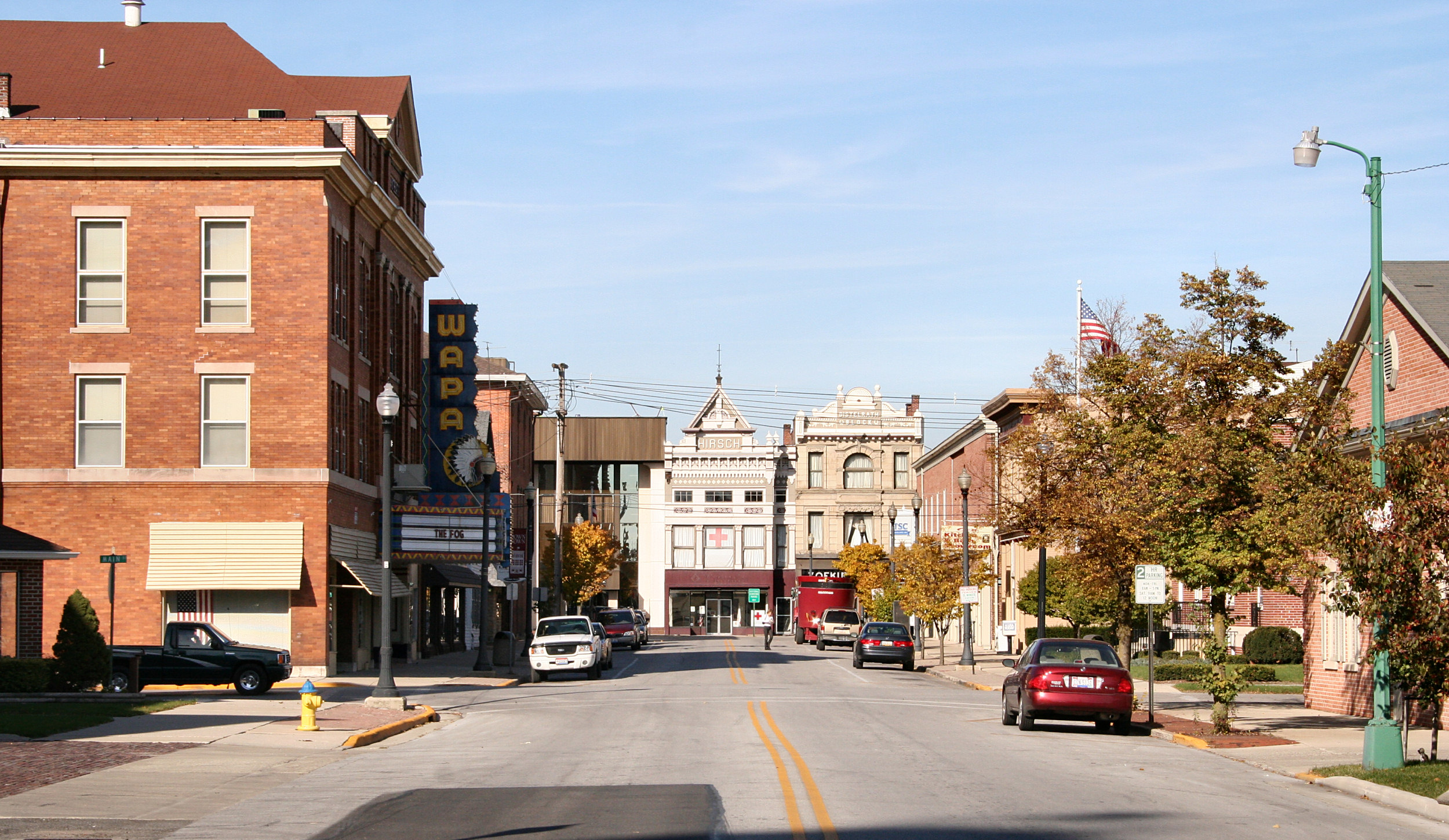
- Downtown Wapakoneta

- Flag Seal
- Nicknames: Home of the First Man on the Moon, Home of Neil Armstrong, Moon City, Wapak
- Interactive map of Wapakoneta, Ohio
- Location within Ohio Location within the United States
- Coordinates: 40°33′56″N 84°11′28″W
- Country: United States
- State: Ohio
- County: Auglaize
- Townships: Duchouquet, Pusheta, Moulton
- Founded: 1782
- Incorporated: March 2, 1849

Government
  - Mayor: Dan E. Lee (R)

Area
  - Total: 6.61 sq mi (17.13 km^{2})
  - Land: 6.56 sq mi (17.00 km^{2})
  - Water: 0.050 sq mi (0.13 km^{2})
- Elevation: 896 ft (273 m)

Population (2020)
  - Total: 9,957
  - Density: 1,517.2/sq mi (585.79/km^{2})
- Time zone: UTC-5 (EST)
  - Summer (DST): UTC-4 (EDT)
- ZIP codes: 45895
- Area codes: 419, 567
- FIPS code: 39-80766
- GNIS feature ID: 2397191
- Website: wapakoneta.net

Wapakoneta (/ˌwɑːpəkəˈnɛtə/ WAH-pə-kə-NET-ə, commonly shortened to “Wapak”) is a city in Auglaize County, Ohio, United States, and its county seat. Located along the Auglaize River, the city is about 56 miles (90 km) north of Dayton and 83 miles (134 km) south of Toledo. The population was 9,957 at the 2020 census. It is the principal city of the Wapakoneta micropolitan area, which is included in the Lima–Van Wert–Celina combined statistical area.

Neil Armstrong, the first man on the Moon, grew up in Wapakoneta, which is now the home of the Armstrong Air & Space Museum.

== History ==
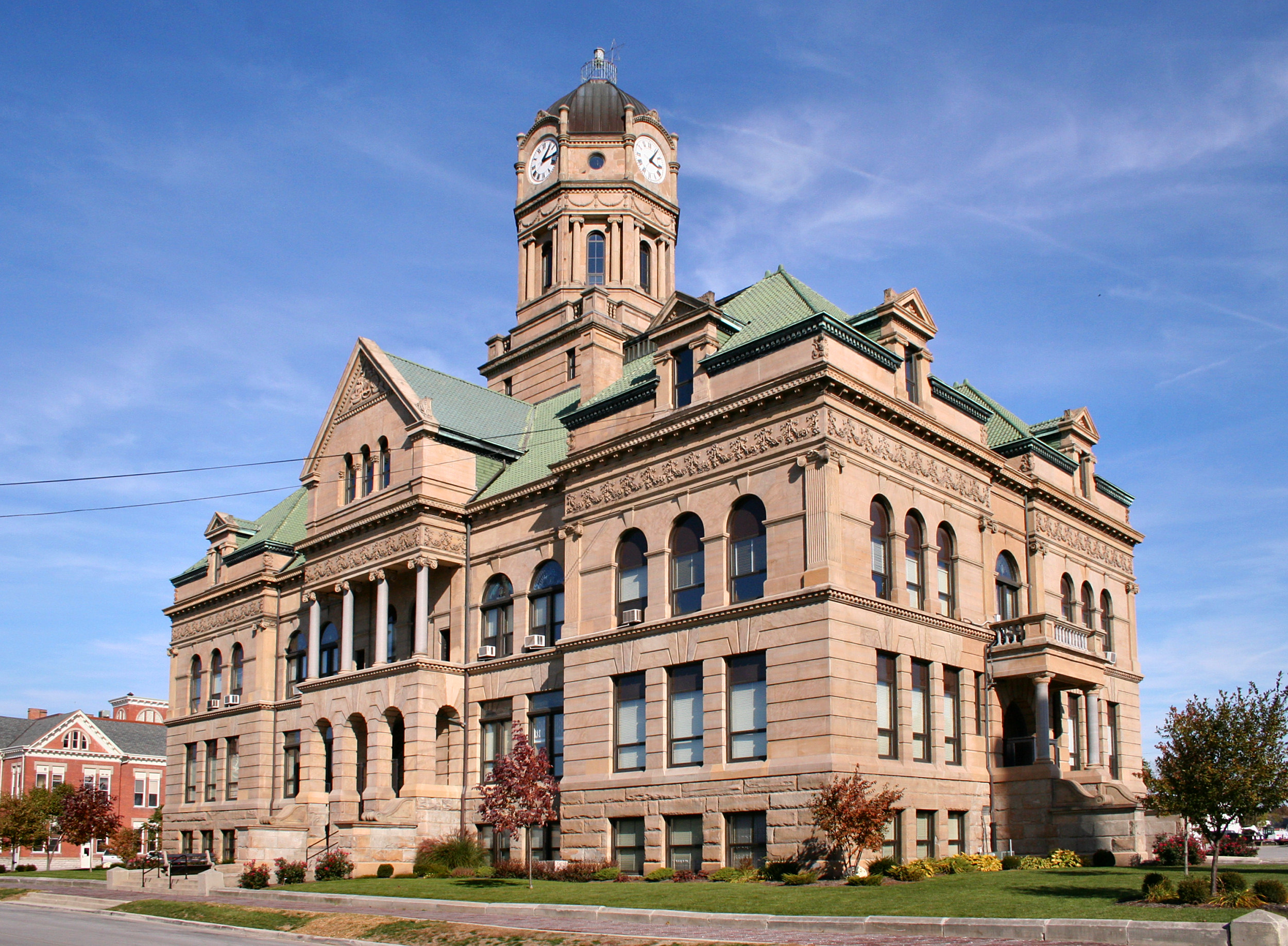
Auglaize County Courthouse

In 1748, the French built a trading post (Fort au Glaize, also known as "Wapakoneta Trading Post" or "AuGlaize Trading Post") about a half-mile northeast of the future site of Wapakoneta. After being re-established in 1760 as "Francis Duchouquet's Trading Post," the British later took over this territory after the French ceded it following defeat in the Seven Years' War. Neither they nor the later Americans (after independence) built a succeeding fort here. French-Canadian traders later reestablished a trading post at the site in 1784, which was abandoned after the Battle of Fallen Timbers in 1794.

The city itself was established in the 1780s as a Shawnee settlement called "Waughpaughkonnetta" (possibly derived from the Shawnee word "Wa-po'kanite," meaning "the place of white bones"). After the Shawnee tribe was removed to Kansas in 1831, Wapakoneta was platted in 1833 and later named as the seat of Auglaize County in 1848.

The Armstrong Air & Space Museum opened in Wapakoneta in 1972.

== Geography ==
According to the United States Census Bureau, the city has an area of 6.26 square miles (16.21 km^{2}), of which 6.21 square miles (16.08 km^{2}) is land and 0.05 square miles (0.13 km^{2}) is water.

Wapakoneta is on the Auglaize River and includes parts of Duchouquet, Pusheta, and Moulton Townships.

== Demographics ==
Historical population
Census	Pop.	Note	%±
1850	504		—
1860	900		78.6%
1870	2,150		138.9%
1880	2,705		25.8%
1890	3,616		33.7%
1900	3,915		8.3%
1910	5,349		36.6%
1920	5,295		−1.0%
1930	5,378		1.6%
1940	5,225		−2.8%
1950	5,797		10.9%
1960	6,756		16.5%
1970	7,324		8.4%
1980	8,402		14.7%
1990	9,214		9.7%
2000	9,474		2.8%
2010	9,867		4.1%
2020	9,957		0.9%
2025 (est.)	9,711		−2.5%

=== 2020 census ===
As of the 2020 census, Wapakoneta had a population of 9,957. The median age was 38.8 years. 24.4% of residents were under the age of 18 and 18.4% of residents were 65 years of age or older. For every 100 females there were 92.8 males, and for every 100 females age 18 and over there were 91.1 males age 18 and over.

There were 4,148 households in Wapakoneta, of which 28.5% had children under the age of 18 living in them. Of all households, 43.9% were married-couple households, 19.0% were households with a male householder and no spouse or partner present, and 29.3% were households with a female householder and no spouse or partner present. About 31.7% of all households were made up of individuals and 14.6% had someone living alone who was 65 years of age or older.

There were 4,404 housing units, of which 5.8% were vacant. The homeowner vacancy rate was 1.1% and the rental vacancy rate was 5.6%.

98.8% of residents lived in urban areas, while 1.2% lived in rural areas.

Racial composition as of the 2020 census
Race	Number	Percent
White	9,269	93.1%
Black or African American	50	0.5%
American Indian and Alaska Native	29	0.3%
Asian	55	0.6%
Native Hawaiian and Other Pacific Islander	4	0.0%
Some other race	86	0.9%
Two or more races	464	4.7%
Hispanic or Latino (of any race)	255	2.6%

=== 2010 census ===
As of the 2010 census, there were 9,867 people, 4,037 households, and 2,614 families residing in the city. The population density was 1,588.9 inhabitants per square mile (613.5/km^{2}). There were 4,332 housing units at an average density of 697.6 per square mile (269.3/km^{2}). The racial makeup of the city was 97.1% White, 0.4% African American, 0.3% Native American, 0.4% Asian, 0.6% from other races, and 1.2% from two or more races. Hispanic or Latino of any race were 1.6% of the population.

There were 4,037 households, of which 32.6% had children under the age of 18 living with them, 46.7% were married couples living together, 12.8% had a female householder with no husband present, 5.3% had a male householder with no wife present, and 35.2% were non-families. 30.5% of all households were made up of individuals, and 13.1% had someone living alone who was 65 years of age or older. The average household size was 2.39 and the average family size was 2.95.

The median age in the city was 37 years. 25.2% of residents were under the age of 18; 8.6% were between the ages of 18 and 24; 26% were from 25 to 44; 24.4% were from 45 to 64; and 15.6% were 65 years of age or older. The gender makeup of the city was 47.8% male and 52.2% female.

== Education ==
Wapakoneta is home to Wapakoneta High School. The city has a public library, the main branch of the Auglaize County Public Library.

== Notable people ==
- Neil Armstrong, NASA Gemini 8/Apollo 11 astronaut, first man to walk on the Moon
- Lloyd Bitzer, rhetorician and professor
- Kent Boyd, dancer, runner-up on So You Think You Can Dance
- Charles Brading, pharmacist and politician
- Jennifer Crusie, romance novel writer
- George Russell Davis, Associate Justice of the Arizona Territorial Supreme Court
- Bob Ewing, Major League Baseball player
- Dan Newland, journalist, translator, and writer
- Dudley Nichols, Oscar-winning screenwriter

== Sister cities ==
Wapakoneta has one sister city, as designated by the Sister Cities International: Lengerich, Nordrhein-Westfalen, Germany.

Lengerich's neighboring municipalities, Ladbergen and Lienen, are sister cities with Wapakoneta's neighbors New Knoxville and Saint Marys, respectively.

== See also ==
- United Remnant Band of the Shawnee Nation
