= Channel 15 low-power TV stations in the United States =

The following low-power television stations broadcast on digital or analog channel 15 in the United States:

- K15AA-D in Hugo, Oklahoma
- K15AF-D in Petersburg, Alaska
- K15AL-D in Winnemucca, Nevada
- K15AP-D in Moose Pass, Alaska
- K15AS-D in Saco, Montana
- K15AT-D in Kodiak, Alaska
- K15AU-D in Pilot Station, Alaska
- K15BP-D in Grants Pass, Oregon
- K15BZ in Daggett, California
- K15CD-D in Mayfield, Utah
- K15CR-D in Lake Havasu City, Arizona
- K15CU-D in Salinas, California
- K15CX-D in Oroville, California
- K15DS-D in Newport, etc., Oregon
- K15ED-D in Waunita Hot Springs, Colorado
- K15EE-D in Elko, Nevada
- K15FC-D in Twentynine Palms, California
- K15FD-D in Holyoke, Colorado
- K15FJ-D in Lakeport, California
- K15FL-D in Park City, Utah
- K15FQ-D in Milford, etc., Utah
- K15FT-D in Roswell, New Mexico
- K15FV-D in Red River, New Mexico
- K15GL-D in Trinidad/Valdez, etc., Colorado
- K15GO-D in Georgetown, Idaho
- K15GT-D in Hibbing, Minnesota
- K15GU-D in Dove Creek, etc., Colorado
- K15GZ-D in Wendover, Utah
- K15HC-D in Quemado/Pie Town, New Mexico
- K15HD-D in Taos, New Mexico
- K15HE-D in Hatch, Utah
- K15HG-D in Mount Pleasant, Utah
- K15HH-D in Green River, Utah
- K15HJ-D in Ridgecrest, etc., California
- K15HK-D in Sheridan, Wyoming
- K15HL-D in Cherokee & Alva, Oklahoma
- K15HM-D in Montezuma Creek/Aneth, Utah
- K15HN-D in Bluff & area, Utah
- K15HQ-D in Sayre, Oklahoma
- K15HR-D in Mackay, Idaho
- K15HU-D in Lakeview, Oregon
- K15HV-D in Chico, California
- K15HY-D in Williams-Ashfork, Arizona
- K15IA-D in Orderville, Utah
- K15IB-D in Malad, Idaho
- K15IF-D in Basalt, Colorado
- K15IG-D in Deming, New Mexico
- K15II-D in Newcastle, Wyoming
- K15IM-D in Brookings, etc., Oregon
- K15IO-D in McCall & New Meadows, Idaho
- K15IQ-D in Astoria, Oregon
- K15IS-D in Willmar, Minnesota
- K15IX-D in Rainier, Oregon
- K15IY-D in Heron, Montana
- K15IZ-D in Edgemont, South Dakota
- K15JA-D in Harlowton, etc., Montana
- K15JG-D in Scottsburg, Oregon
- K15JO-D in Chama, New Mexico
- K15JV-D in Mexican Hat, Utah
- K15JZ-D in Applegate Valley, Oregon
- K15KB-D in Squaw Valley, Oregon
- K15KC-D in Yakima, Washington
- K15KE-D in Klamath Falls, etc., Oregon
- K15KF-D in Coos Bay, Oregon
- K15KG-D in Eads, etc., Colorado
- K15KJ-D in Gold Hill, Oregon
- K15KK-D in Mt. Powell, New Mexico
- K15KL-D in Jacksonville, Oregon
- K15KM-D in Sundance, Wyoming
- K15KN-D in Roseburg, Oregon
- K15KO-D in Redding, California
- K15KP-D in St. Louis, Missouri
- K15KQ-D in Coalville, Utah
- K15KR-D in Poplar, Montana
- K15KS-D in Garfield, etc., Utah
- K15KT-D in Rural Sevier County, Utah
- K15KU-D in Teasdale/Torrey, Utah
- K15KV-D in Rockaway Beach, Oregon
- K15KW-D in Philipsburg, Montana
- K15KX-D in Circleville, Utah
- K15KY-D in Richfield, etc., Utah
- K15KZ-D in Koosharem, Utah
- K15LA-D in Panguitch, Utah
- K15LB-D in Red Lodge, Montana
- K15LC-D in Henrieville, Utah
- K15LD-D in Lewistown, Montana
- K15LE-D in Heber City, Utah
- K15LG-D in Hawthorne, Nevada
- K15LI-D in Sterling, Colorado
- K15LJ-D in Enterprise, etc., Utah
- K15LK-D in Scipio, Utah
- K15LL-D in Leamington, Utah
- K15LM-D in McAlester, Oklahoma
- K15LO-D in Fruitland, Utah
- K15LP-D in Rural Carbon County, Utah
- K15LQ-D in Orangeville, Utah
- K15LR-D in Meadview, Arizona
- K15LS-D in Redwood Falls, Minnesota
- K15LU-D in Eureka, Nevada
- K15LW-D in Utahn, Utah
- K15LY-D in Ruth, Nevada
- K15LZ-D in Tucumcari, New Mexico
- K15MB-D in Kansas City, Missouri
- K15MD-D in Wray, Colorado
- K15ME-D in Salmon, Idaho
- K15MF-D in Raton, etc., New Mexico
- K15MH-D in Anton, Colorado
- K15MI-D in Centralia/Chehalis, Washington
- K15MJ-D in Cortez, etc., Colorado
- K15MP-D in Rawlins, Wyoming
- K15MR-D in Fargo, North Dakota
- K15MW-D in Bellingham, Washington
- K15MY-D in Caputa, South Dakota
- KBTU-LD in Salt Lake City, Utah, on virtual channel 23
- KELV-LD in Las Vegas, Nevada
- KFVD-LD in Porterville, California
- KFXO-CD in Bend, Oregon
- KHPL-CD in La Grange, Texas
- KIUA-LD in Lincoln, Nebraska
- KLMV-LD in Laredo, Texas
- KMSQ-LD in Mesquite, Nevada
- KNPB in Truckee/Lake Tahoe, Nevada
- KNPN-LD in Saint Joseph, Missouri
- KOOG-LD in Bozeman, Montana
- KORY-CD in Eugene, Oregon
- KOXO-CD in Portland, Oregon, an ATSC 3.0 station
- KRHD-CD in Bryan, Texas
- KTEL-CD in Albuquerque, New Mexico
- KTLD-CD in Bakersfield, California
- KUNA-LD in Indio, California
- KUTO-LD in Logan, Utah
- KVCW (DRT) in Pahrump, Nevada, an ATSC 3.0 station
- KVTX-LD in Victoria, Texas
- KVVK-CD in Kennewick, etc., Washington
- KVVV-LD in Houston, Texas
- KWJM-LD in Minneapolis, Minnesota
- KXAP-LD in Tulsa, Oklahoma
- KXBK-LD in Bismarck, North Dakota
- KYUB-LD in Yuba City, California
- KYUK-LD in Bethel, Alaska
- KYUM-LD in Yuma, Arizona
- KZAU-LD in Killeen, Texas
- W15BU-D in Johnson City, Illinois
- W15CO-D in Towanda, Pennsylvania
- W15CW-D in Franklin, North Carolina
- W15DC-D in Florence, South Carolina
- W15DF-D in Houghton Lake, Michigan
- W15DO-D in Norfolk, Virginia
- W15DS-D in Bangor, Maine
- W15DY-D in Marion, etc., North Carolina
- W15EA-D in Memphis, Tennessee
- W15EB-D in Charlotte, North Carolina
- W15EE-D in Ashland, Wisconsin
- W15EF-D in Sparta, North Carolina
- W15EG-D in Corning, New York
- W15EL-D in Mars Hill, North Carolina
- W15EO-D in Sebastian, Florida
- W15ES-D in Myrtle Beach, South Carolina
- WBNF-CD in Buffalo, New York
- WBXM-CD in Montgomery, Alabama
- WDDY-LD in Jackson, Tennessee
- WDKT-LD in Hendersonville, North Carolina
- WDYL-LD in Louisville, Kentucky
- WGGD-LD in Gainesville, Georgia
- WHPS-CD in Detroit, Michigan
- WHWD-LD in Winston-Salem, North Carolina
- WILM-LD in Wilmington, North Carolina
- WKHD-LD in Mayaguez, Puerto Rico
- WLCU-CD in Campbellsville, Kentucky
- WMWD-LD in Madison, Wisconsin
- WNFT-LD in Gainesville, Florida
- WOHL-CD in Lima, Ohio
- WOOK-LD in Meridian, Mississippi
- WPBM-CD in Scottsville, Kentucky
- WPHJ-LD in Baxley, Georgia
- WQMC-LD in Columbus, Ohio
- WREP-LD in Martinsville, Indiana
- WRTD-CD in Raleigh, North Carolina, uses WRAZ's full-power spectrum
- WSSF-LD in Fayette, Alabama
- WTFL-LD in Tallahassee, Florida
- WTNX-LD in Nashville, Tennessee
- WUDW-LD in Richmond, Virginia
- WUJX-LD in Jacksonville, Florida
- WUSP-LD in Ponce, Puerto Rico
- WXSP-CD in Grand Rapids, Michigan, an ATSC 3.0 station
- WYBM-LD in Westmoreland, New Hampshire
- WYYW-CD in Evansville, Indiana
- WZRA-CD in Oldsmar, Florida

The following low-power stations, which are no longer licensed, formerly broadcast on analog or digital channel 15:

- K15AG-D in Ninilchik, Alaska
- K15AI in Valdez, Alaska
- K15AJ in Wrangell, Alaska
- K15AK in Cordova, Alaska
- K15DA in Tulsa, Oklahoma
- K15DP in Crowley Lake-Long Va, California
- K15FP in Peoa/Oakley, Utah
- K15FR in Evanston, etc., Wyoming
- K15FW in Batesville, Arkansas
- K15GQ in Orangeville, Utah
- K15GS in Duckwater, etc., Nevada
- K15IC-D in Weed, California
- K15IL-D in John Day, Oregon
- K15JL-D in Billings, Montana
- K15MA-D in Cottonwood, etc., Idaho
- KABH-LP in Bend, Oregon
- KCBJ-LP in Juneau, Alaska
- KEID-LD in Lufkin, Texas
- KMJT-LP in Ogden, Kansas
- KMXU-LP in San Antonio, Texas
- KZOL-LP in Safford, Arizona
- W15AZ in Alabaster, Alabama
- W15BP in Pinconning, Michigan
- W15CG in Pontotoc, Mississippi
- WCUL-LP in Oneida, New York
- WCYD-LD in Myrtle Beach, South Carolina
- WCZA-LD in Marion, Indiana
- WDDZ-LD in Augusta, Georgia
- WFDE-LD in Champaign, Illinois
- WISF-LP in Oneonta, New York
- WLLB-LD in Portland, Maine
- WSFD-LD in Perry, Florida
- WWJS-CD in Clarksville, Indiana
- WWWN-LP in Memphis, Tennessee
