= WLJM =

WLJM may refer to:

- WLJM-LP, a low-power radio station (95.3 FM) licensed to serve Miami Beach, Florida, United States
- WCIT (AM), a radio station (940 AM) licensed to serve Lima, Ohio, United States, which held the call sign WLJM from 1997 to 2007
- WEGE, a radio station (104.9 FM) licensed to serve Lima, Ohio, which held the call sign WLJM from 1996 to 1997
- WQEN, a radio station (103.7 FM) licensed to serve Trussville, Alabama, which held the call sign WLJM-FM from 1966 to 1975
