= Channel 35 virtual TV stations in the United States =

The following television stations operate on virtual channel 35 in the United States:

- K20JL-D in Ellensburg, etc., Washington
- K25JO-D in Altus, Oklahoma
- K34NB-D in Lubbock, Texas
- K35JN-D in Duluth, Minnesota
- K35KC-D in Great Falls, Montana
- K35KH-D in Walker, Minnesota
- K35KX-D in Topeka, Kansas
- K35LA-D in Palm Springs, California
- K35MF-D in Big Spring, Texas
- K35NR-D in Willmar, Minnesota
- K35OY-D in Columbia, Missouri
- K35PJ-D in Santa Barbara, California
- K35PO-D in Bismarck, North Dakota
- KAPP in Yakima, Washington
- KAXW-LD in Mullin, Texas
- KCBA in Salinas, California
- KCFT-CD in Anchorage, Alaska
- KESE-LD in Yuma, Arizona
- KEUV-LD in Eureka, California
- KFGX-LD in Fargo, North Dakota
- KFKZ-LD in Cedar Falls, Iowa
- KFPH-CD in Phoenix, Arizona
- KGLR-LD in Sparks, Nevada
- KHBA-LD in Spokane, Washington
- KHFW-LD in Dallas, Texas
- KJBO-LD in Wichita Falls, Texas
- KJBW-LD in Paragould, Arkansas
- KJNM-LD in Fayetteville, Arkansas
- KMYS in Kerrville, Texas
- KORK-CD in Portland, Oregon
- KRAH-CD in Paris, Arkansas
- KRSU-TV in Claremore, Oklahoma
- KRZG-CD in McAllen, Texas
- KTAV-LD in Los Angeles, California
- KTSB-CD in Santa Maria, California
- KTXC-LD in Amarillo, Texas
- KVTE-LD in Las Vegas, Nevada
- KXSH-LD in Rochester, Minnesota
- KXTF in Twin Falls, Idaho
- KYUU-LD in Boise, Idaho
- W35BB-D in Dublin, Georgia
- W35CS-D in Ocean City, Maryland
- W35DH-D in Greenville, Florida
- W35DI-D in Roanoke, West Virginia
- W35DZ-D in Algood, Tennessee
- W35EC-D in Lake City, Florida
- W35EE-D in Demopolis, Alabama
- WAMS-LD in Minster-New Bremen, Ohio
- WCTZ-LD in Bowling Green, Kentucky
- WCZS-LD in Chambersburg, Pennsylvania
- WFBN-LD in Rockford, Illinois
- WFCU-LD in Augusta, Georgia
- WFGX in Fort Walton Beach, Florida
- WGCB-LD in Hinesville-Richmond, Georgia
- WGVU-TV in Grand Rapids, Michigan
- WHCT-LD in Hartford, New Haven, Connecticut
- WIPL in Lewiston, Maine
- WJDW-LD in Tazewell, Virginia
- WKHA in Hazard, Kentucky
- WKMA-TV in Madisonville, Kentucky
- WLOO in Vicksburg, Mississippi
- WNKY-LD in Bowling Green, Kentucky
- WOCV-CD in Cleveland, Ohio
- WOFL in Orlando, Florida
- WOHL-CD in Lima, Ohio
- WPBY-LD in Lafayette, Indiana
- WPNM-LD in Liepsic, Ohio
- WPPT in Philadelphia, Pennsylvania
- WPXM-TV in Miami, Florida
- WPXU-TV in Jacksonville, North Carolina
- WRCZ-LD in Ocala, Florida
- WRLH-TV in Richmond, Virginia
- WRLK-TV in Columbia, South Carolina
- WSEE-TV in Erie, Pennsylvania
- WSLF-LD in Port St. Lucie, Florida
- WSPF-CD in St. Petersburg, Florida
- WWKH-CD in Uniontown, Pennsylvania
- WWLF-LD in Syracuse, New York
- WWTO-TV in La Salle, Illinois
- WYLN-LP in Hazleton, Pennsylvania
- WZCH-LD in Myrtle Beach, South Carolina

The following stations formerly operated on virtual channel 35, but are no longer licensed:

- K35DG-D in La Jolla, California
- K41JF-D in Hagerman, Idaho
- KIDB-LD in Sweetwater, Texas
- KZMB-LD in Enid, Oklahoma
- WCTX-CD in Virginia Beach, Virginia
- WSWH-LD in Decatur, Alabama
- WUCV-LD in Florence, South Carolina
