= WLCU =

WLCU may refer to:

- WLCU (FM), a radio station (88.7 FM) licensed to Campbellsville, Kentucky, United States
- WLCU-CD, a television station (channel 15, virtual 4) licensed to Campbellsville, Kentucky, United States
- World Lebanese Cultural Union, also known by its acronym WLCU
