= WMLX =

Radio station in St. Marys–Lima, Ohio

Coordinates: 40.634°N 84.208°W

- St. Marys, Ohio; United States
- Broadcast area: Lima, Ohio
- Frequency: 103.3 MHz
- Branding: Mix 103.3

Programming
- Format: Adult contemporary

Ownership
- Owner: iHeartMedia, Inc.; (iHM Licenses, LLC)
- Sister stations: WBKS, WIMA, WIMT, WZRX-FM

History
- First air date: 1998; 28 years ago
- Former call signs: WLVZ (1996–1997); WCKY (1997)

Technical information
- Licensing authority: FCC
- Facility ID: 37499
- Class: A
- ERP: 1,950 watts
- HAAT: 170 meters (560 ft)

Links
- Public license information: Public file; LMS
- Webcast: Listen Live
- Website: mix1033.iheart.com

WMLX (103.3 FM "Mix 103.3") is a commercial radio station licensed to St. Marys, Ohio. It airs an adult contemporary format. Its studios and offices are located on West Market Street in Lima, Ohio, and its transmitter is located just outside Buckland, Ohio.

The station began broadcasting in December 1997 with 10,000 songs in a row. The station garnered top ratings, becoming number one by the spring of 1999, in the adult 25-54 demographic.

== See also ==
- Mix FM (disambiguation)
- List of radio stations in Ohio
