= WCIT (AM) =

- Lima, Ohio; United States
- Frequency: 940 kHz
- Branding: 98.5 FM, 940 AM The Legend

Programming
- Format: Classic country
- Affiliations: Compass Media Networks; United Stations Radio Networks; Westwood One

Ownership
- Owner: Woof Boom Radio; (Woof Boom Radio of Lima, LLC)
- Sister stations: WDOH, WEGE, WFGF, WWSR

History
- First air date: 1959
- Former call signs: WCIT (1959–1998); WLJM (1998–2007); WZOQ (2007–2009)
- Call sign meaning: The Lima Citizen (original owner)

Technical information
- Licensing authority: FCC
- Facility ID: 1062
- Class: D
- Power: 250 watts day; 6 watts night
- Transmitter coordinates: 40°43′21.00″N 84°5′4.00″W
- Translator: 98.5 W253CM (Lima)

Links
- Public license information: Public file; LMS
- Webcast: Listen Live
- Website: 940wcit.com

WCIT (940 kHz), is also 98.5 FM and is a commercial broadcast radio station in Lima, Ohio. The station, along with FM sister stations WEGE, WWSR and WFGF, share studio facilities on Town Square Rd. in Lima. WCIT must operate with reduced power after local sunset to avoid interference with CFNV in Montreal, a Canadian clear channel signal reserved by international treaty.

== History ==
Originally broadcasting only during the daytime hours, WCIT was founded in 1959 by the owners of The Lima Citizen. The Citizen folded in 1964, shortly thereafter, WCIT was sold off by the now-former newspaper's owners to Riggs Broadcasting, who also owned a combination AM/FM combination in Lansing, Michigan. Riggs Broadcasting owners were Richard Riggs, his wife Norma Riggs, Sales Manager Bob Rice and Chief Engineer Ray Allen.

WCIT would find a new studio home February 15, 1968, in downtown Lima. The studios were located on the 9th floor, suite 940 of Cook Tower, which was Lima's tallest building at the time. The move to a new studio location occurred in 1971 with FM sister WLSR. It would be known as the "Lima Broadcast House" at 1301 Cable Road. Much of its programming consisted of an hourly local newscast and a Top Forty format using the branding "Great 94". WCIT became the market leader within a few years being the most recognized name in the market for news and music. Jim Baldridge, a Lima native had his start at WCIT in the late 1960s before moving on to WIZE in Springfield and later at WHIO-TV in Dayton.

In 1972, the station entered an era of the small town top 40 radio station with a big city sound. Jim Wood (Robert Marquitz), Tommy Judge (Carl David Hamilton), Johnny Williams, Skip Essex, Rick Lane, Chuck Martin (L Harrison), Dave Shannon, Bill Apple, Rob Bromley, Don Sherwood and Steve R. Nelson. Gordy Price (later of WIMT) spent part of his career beginnings at WCIT in 1974 as afternoon personality before automating in 1975 as "Rock 94." Price also worked at WMVR, WING and the former WTOO (now WPKO) before his move to WIMT in 1987.

In 1986 Riggs Broadcasting sold WCIT and WLSR to Allen Broadcasting. Upon taking over the radio station they flipped WCIT to oldies. In 1991, WCIT switched to all news and talk, featuring a three-hour morning news block with local anchors Bill Holden and Anne Nashif and national news from CBS at the top of each hour and NBC Radio News at the bottom of the hour. Regional news, weather and sports were provided by the Ohio News Network. WCIT also added Rush Limbaugh to its lineup, boosting the station's listenership and ratings.

In 1996, Allen Broadcasting switched the format of sister station WLSR from adult contemporary to urban using the calls WLJM. Then in 1997, WCIT and WLJM were sold to Forever Broadcasting of Pennsylvania who owned WZOQ and WYRX. Forever Broadcasting moved the urban format to the AM side and turned WLJM-FM into a soft adult contemporary again.

WLJM's call letters originally referred to its former nickname "Lima's 940 JAMZ" for its urban contemporary and R&B format. 940 JAMZ was the local affiliate of ABC Radio's "Hits and Oldies" satellite R&B format (also known as "The Touch") as well as the Tom Joyner Morning Show which were both discontinued after the station was sold by Forever Broadcasting to Maverick Media in 2005. Beforehand, 940 JAMZ was locally originating with personalities. It then changed format to "Lima's ESPN 940", carrying the programming of the national sports network ESPN Radio, in a move that created a large outcry among the African-American community in Lima as WLJM was Lima's only radio station specifically targeting Black listeners. Some local sports programming included "Sports Talk With Koza" hosted by former WLIO-TV sports director Vince Koza, "Sportsrap with Matt and Matt" and TALK with Ron Williams.

In 2007, the WLJM call letters were replaced with WZOQ, calls that were previously used at 92.1 FM, which became WWSR and is now WFGF. On June 1, 2009, the sports/talk format was moved to the FM dial on the 93.1 FM facility and taking the WWSR calls. The country format and WFGF calls were then relocated to the 92.1 FM facility, and the 940 facility reverted to their original WCIT calls and assumed an oldies format.

On January 10, 2011, WCIT changed their format from oldies to news/talk.

In July 2013, Childers Media Group purchased WCIT and its Lima clustermates from Maverick Media for $2.1 million. Childers Media Group was in turn acquired by Wolf Boom Radio in 2017.

On January 6, 2014, WCIT re-launched as Sports Talk 940.

On July 1, 2019, WCIT dropped the sports format and began stunting with Christmas music with the sign-on of FM translator W253CM 98.5; on July 4, 2019, it launched a classic country format, branded as 98.5 The Legend.
