= WBKS =

- Columbus Grove, Ohio; United States
- Broadcast area: Lima, Ohio
- Frequency: 93.9 MHz
- Branding: 93.9 Kiss FM

Programming
- Format: Contemporary hit radio
- Affiliations: Premiere Networks

Ownership
- Owner: iHeartMedia, Inc.; (iHM Licenses, LLC)
- Sister stations: WIMA, WIMT, WMLX, WZRX-FM

History
- First air date: April 1, 2003

Technical information
- Licensing authority: FCC
- Facility ID: 40714
- Class: B1
- ERP: 14,000 watts
- HAAT: 133 meters (436 ft)
- Transmitter coordinates: 40°57′24″N 84°07′56″W

Links
- Public license information: Public file; LMS
- Webcast: Listen live (via iHeartRadio)
- Website: kisslima.iheart.com

WBKS (93.9 FM, "93.9 Kiss FM"), owned by iHeartMedia, Inc., is a radio station serving Lima, Ohio with a contemporary hit radio format. Its studios are located with WIMA, WIMT-FM, WZRX-FM, and WMLX-FM on West Market Street in Lima. Its transmitter is located between Kalida and Columbus Grove, its city of license, in southern Putnam County.

== History ==
The station was formerly known as WLWD, "Wild 93-9," until April 1, 2010. WLWD was originally a Rhythmic Contemporary station but had begun adding more mainstream pop and rock hits to its rotation in June 2009. With the change to 93-9 Kiss FM, the station has now fully transitioned to Mainstream Top 40/CHR, and now has the hit-music format to itself in Lima with former competitor station WZOQ/WWSR's change to a sports format and move from its original 92.1 frequency (now WFGF) to 93.1.

== Programming ==
Mornings are syndicated with Elvis Duran and the Morning Show. WBKS promotes and is known for commercial free hours. Nationally syndicated Ryan Seacrest airs during the midday. DJ Old Skool holds down afternoons w/ the 5:00 Rewind, on-air from 2-6p. From 6-11p it's Kennedy at night. Although the jocks and imaging are local, most of the music is programmed by Clear Channel's Premium Choice CHR format with little local changes. They run CLUB 9-3-9 on Friday & Saturday Nights. CLUB 9-3-9 kicks off early on Friday evenings at 5pm. And the studio keys are given to Matt on the weekends. He is on the air on Saturday and Sundays from 10a-3p.
