= Fox 25 =

Fox 25 can refer to one of the following television stations in the United States that broadcast on channel 25 and carry the Fox affiliation:

== Current ==
- KOKH-TV in Oklahoma City, Oklahoma
- WFXT in Boston, Massachusetts
- WLAX in La Crosse, Wisconsin
- WXXV-TV in Gulfport, Mississippi

== Former ==
- WOHL-CD in Lima, Ohio (1995–2009)
