= WLOK (Ohio) =

Radio station in Lima, Ohio (1936–1954)

WLOK and WLOK-FM
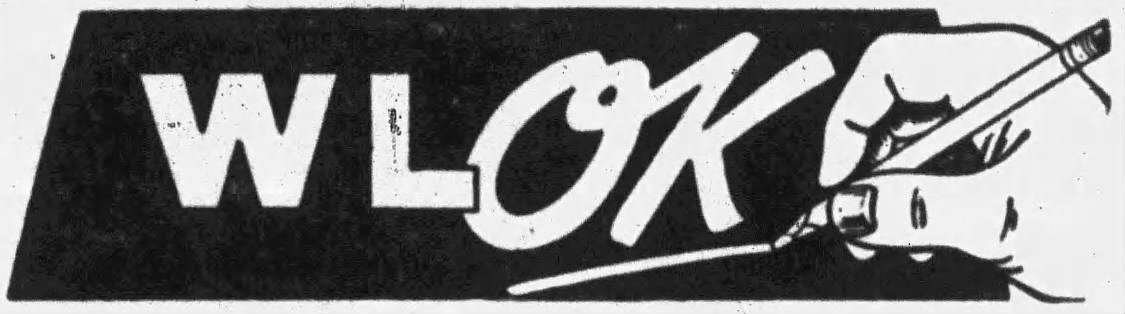
- Logo for WLOK, c. 1951.

Lima, Ohio; United States
- Frequencies: WLOK: 1240 kHz; WLOK-FM: 103.3 MHz

Ownership
- Owner: Herbert Bly (1936–1938); Fort Industry Company (1938–1951); Lloyd Pixley (1951–1954)

History
- First air date: WLOK: December 10, 1936; WLOK-FM: September 1948
- Last air date: WLOK: December 8, 1954; WLOK-FM: February 25, 1953
- Former call signs: WLOK: WBLY (1936–1939)
- Former frequencies: WLOK: 1210 kHz (1936–1941)
- Call sign meaning: Derived from CKOK, original call sign for CKLW in Windsor, Ontario

Technical information
- Class: WLOK: IV (Local); WLOK-FM: B
- Power: WLOK: 250 watts (unlimited)
- ERP: WLOK-FM: 340 watts
- HAAT: WLOK-FM: 175 feet (53 m)
- Transmitter coordinates: WLOK: 40°44′51.2″N 84°7′54.3″W

WLOK and WLOK-FM were a pair of radio stations licensed to Lima, Ohio, United States, and broadcast at 1240 AM and 103.3 FM. The AM station signed on in 1936, while the FM was launched in 1948. Both stations transmitted from facilities on Rice Avenue, northwest of downtown Lima.

For most of its history, WLOK was owned by the Fort Industry Company, predecessor to Storer Broadcasting, and later majority-owned by famed Ohio State Buckeyes football player Lloyd Pixley. Under Pixley ownership, WLOK-TV signed on at channel 73 as an early UHF station. After Pixley's death in 1954, WLOK radio and television were sold to the owners of WIMA radio, which held a permit for channel 35; it surrendered the licenses for WLOK radio outright on December 8, 1954, and transferred WLOK-TV to the lower dial position in April 1955, renaming it WIMA-TV. Now WLIO, the television station continues to operate from the same Rice Avenue facility.

== History ==
Herbert Lee Bly, who helped build and sign on WTBO in Cumberland, Maryland, sold his interests in both it and WRBX in Bluefield, West Virginia, in 1935, and moved to Lima, Ohio. Prior to moving, Bly filed applications with the Federal Communications Commission (FCC) to construct stations in Uniontown, Pennsylvania, and Lebanon, Pennsylvania, but asked to withdraw these applications in favor of a station for Lima, operating at 1210 kHz with 100 watts during daytime hours. The station signed on as WBLY on December 10, 1936, two weeks ahead of schedule, with the transmitter located at the intersection of Rice and Woodlawn Avenues. Bly personally sought the call sign; in doing so, WBLY became the first licensed radio station in the United States to be named after its owner. A formal opening took place at the Lima Club building in the city's downtown as 1937 began. Local news coverage on WBLY was supplemented by a partnership with The Lima News.

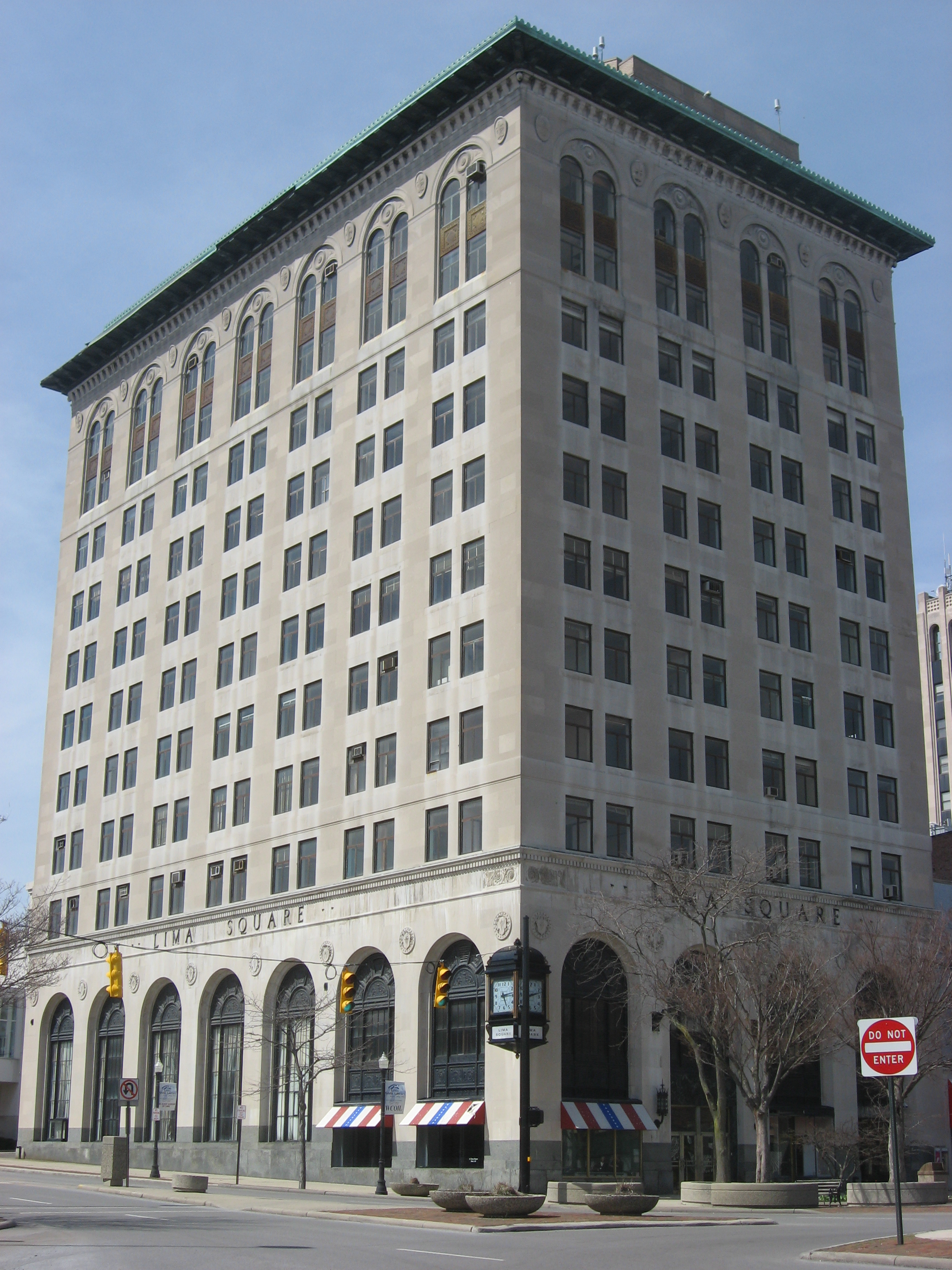
WLOK's studios were located in the First National Bank and Trust Building in Lima from 1939 until 1952.

Less than nine months after taking to the air, Bly sold WBLY to the Fort Industry Company, based in Toledo and the owner of WSPD, for an undisclosed amount. Bly decided to sell the station in order to pursue a career in engineering. The call sign changed to WLOK on February 19, 1939. Fort Industry principles George B. Storer and J. Harold Ryan chose the new calls to mimic CKOK, a radio station in Windsor, Ontario, that Fort Industry operated when it launched in 1931 but was taken over by Canadian interests in 1932 and renamed CKLW. The new WLOK name came with the inauguration of new studios in the First National Bank and Trust Building in downtown Lima. On January 28, 1940, WLOK signed up as an NBC Red Network supplemental affiliate.

Hugh Downs joined WLOK in 1939 as an announcer while still a student at Bluffton College; he was hired after walking past the station where a man on the street interview was being conducted. Holding a quart of milk in his hand, Downs entered the station lobby and asked the receptionist, "how do you become a radio announcer?" Downs was paid $12.50 a week and later recalled the excitement of talking into the microphone for the first time and getting reception reports from listeners throughout Allen County. Downs became WLOK's chief announcer and program director after four months when the existing program director was transferred to WAGA in Atlanta—which Fort Industry acquired—and was hired by WWJ in Detroit in the following year.

Fort Industry also purchased WALR in Zanesville, Ohio, in 1939 and renamed it WHIZ; like WLOK, it also broadcast at 1210 kHz. Facility and power upgrades—investments typical among the growing broadcast chain—were initiated for both WLOK and WHIZ, with both stations going full-time at 250 watts. As a result of NARBA, WLOK relocated to 1240 kHz on March 29, 1941, as did WHIZ. An FM adjunct, WLOK-FM, signed on in September 1948, duplicating the AM's programming outright. It was eventually licensed to operate at 340 watts with an antenna height of 175 feet (53 m). Competition soon arrived in the market, as WIMA-FM (102.1) signed on in June 1948, with WIMA following suit on December 5.

Fort Industry sold WLOK-AM-FM to a group headed by Lloyd Pixley for $137,500, in order to purchase WSAI and WSAI-FM in Cincinnati; both deals were approved on March 31, 1951. The sale was one of several Fort Industry (renamed Storer Broadcasting in 1952) was required to do in the coming years as it was already at the FCC-imposed regulatory limit of seven AM stations, eventually giving the company a reputation of constantly selling stations in smaller markets in order to buy stations in larger markets. J. Robert Kerns, who managed WHIZ before Fort Industry sold it (in order to buy WJBK in Detroit) became manager of WLOK, only to be transferred again to the company's WMMN in Fairmont, West Virginia, after the sale to Pixley. Pixley, a famed football player for the Ohio State Buckeyes in the early 1920s, owned WCOL in Columbus, Ohio, with his mother and wife from 1944 until selling it in 1951 to Air Trails, headed by Charles W. Sawyer, then the U.S. Secretary of Commerce. Robert O. Runnerstrom, who managed WCOL under Pixley, was transferred to WLOK as Kerns' replacement. Later in 1951, Pixley sold 49 percent of WLOK to other Columbus interests but retained 51 percent majority control.

WLOK applied for a new television channel on the UHF band on June 25, 1952, as one of 95 applicants following the FCC's lifting of their "freeze of 1948". The station also proposed to build a new television facility on the radio stations' Rice Avenue transmitter site. The upgrades required rezoning of the land from residential to commercial. Several residents objected to the request under concerns other businesses could attempt the same, while one attorney claimed WLOK-FM's transmissions impaired his television reception. Lima city council approved the zoning request and the construction permits. A new 300-foot (91 m) tower for WLOK was also erected, replacing the original 175-foot (53 m) mast. The FCC granted a permit for WLOK-TV on channel 73 on November 20, 1952; by then, WLOK was in the process of moving out from the First National Bank Building to the Rice Avenue site; by February 25, 1953, WLOK-FM's license was voluntarily cancelled. WIMA also received a permit to operate on channel 35 but WLOK-TV aired its debut program on April 18, 1953, as one of the first UHF stations in the United States.

WLOK staffers were notified on July 30, 1954, that the stations were in the process of being sold, which was confirmed to The Lima News, but the buyer's name was not disclosed. The same day, Lloyd Pixley died at the age of 54; he had suffered a heart attack while attending the 1953 Ohio State-Michigan game and had been in hospital care on and off ever since. Prior to the heart attack, Pixley issued additional stock in what was termed "a financial realignment" and "of no general importance" but his ownership stake was reduced to 34 percent. The buyer was revealed on October 30 to be the Northwestern Ohio Broadcasting Corp., owner of WIMA, who intended to move WLOK-TV onto channel 35 by using their existing permit. Due to the FCC's ban on duopolies, WLOK radio was slated to be silenced and its license surrendered. The total price was $750, met by purchasing all 750 shares of stock in WLOK, Inc. for $1 each, and Northwestern assuming $188,691 in obligations.

The FCC approved the deal on December 1, 1954; WLOK left the air at 11:05 p.m. on December 8, leaving the city without an NBC radio affiliate and with one radio station and one television station. Northwestern promised to maintain both WIMA's downtown studios and WLOK-TV's studios, and there was no loss of personnel. WLOK-TV moved to channel 35 on April 24, 1955, concurrent with a rename to WIMA-TV. The television station continues to broadcast from the Rice Avenue facilities under the current WLIO call sign.

The WLOK calls were subsequently reused at a radio station in Memphis, Tennessee.
