= WLWD =

WLWD may refer to:

- WLWD-LD (channel 24, virtual 20), a low-power television station licensed to serve Dayton, Ohio, United States, which serves as a repeater of the Daystar network
- WDTN (channel 2), a television station licensed to serve Dayton, Ohio, United States which formerly held the WLWD callsign
- WBKS (93.9 FM), a radio station licensed to serve Columbus Grove, Ohio, United States which formerly held the WLWD callsign
