= WDOH =

Coordinates: 40.832°N 84.353°W

- Delphos, Ohio; United States
- Broadcast area: Lima metropolitan area
- Frequency: 107.1 MHz
- Branding: Fun 107.1

Programming
- Language: English
- Format: Classic hits
- Affiliations: United Stations Radio Networks; WestStar TalkRadio Network; Westwood One

Ownership
- Owner: Woof Boom Radio; (Woof Boom Radio of Lima LLC)
- Sister stations: WCIT; WEGE; WFGF; WWSR

History
- First air date: December 1972
- Call sign meaning: Delphos Ohio

Technical information
- Licensing authority: FCC
- Facility ID: 70436
- Class: A
- ERP: 3,300 watts
- HAAT: 91 meters (299 ft)

Links
- Public license information: Public file; LMS
- Webcast: Listen Live
- Website: fun1071fm.com

WDOH ("Fun 107.1") is a commercial FM radio station licensed to Delphos operating at 107.1 MHz with a classic hits format. Its studios are located in Delphos and offices are located in Lima, Ohio with transmitter located in Delphos between Van Wert and Lima.

== History ==
WDOH was signed on in December 1972, by Tri-County Broadcasting. Originally with an automated music package entitled "Hitparade" produced by Drake-Chenault Enterprises. In 1980, the adult contemporary format switched to locally produced automation tapes prior to its switch in 1989, to a country music format. At the time of its founding, the station served the greater Delphos, Fort Jennings and Middle Point area with local news and sporting events. Its original studios and offices were located inside the original Commercial Bank building in downtown Delphos.

In the mid-'70s, Tri-County Broadcasting sold the FM outlet to Vogel Roach, Incorporated, who in the late 1980s, tweaked the format to resemble more of a classic country format, competing against Jacor's owned and operated WIMT in Lima. In 2001, Vogel Roach purchased the station's first automation system replacing the original reel to reel system (nicknamed "The Demon") home built by original engineer and co-founder Ray Tanner. WDOH had been one of the last operations in the United States to operate on a reel to reel format.

In 2005, Maverick Media of Lima, who earlier that year had purchased country WFGF, Top 40 WZOQ, classic hits WUZZ and urban WLJM, purchased the country outlet and flipped it to an all-Christmas music station, making it the area's first all-Christmas station On December 26, a new format was unveiled as the station took on a soft adult contemporary format to protect new sister-owned country WFGF.

On April 1, 2014, WDOH changed their format from soft AC to classic hits, branded as "Fun 107.1".

== Programming ==
WDOH is programmed by Phil Austin who was previously Director of Operations for Clear Channel in Lima over WIMT, WLWD, WMLX, WBUK, WZRX and WIMA as well as the ABN network.

WDOH recently transitioned to an entertainment based AC with the anchor morning show Bob and Sheri, who were on sister station WZOQ for nearly 10 years. The show gained the top-rated position in the market and stayed there for nearly five consecutive years. Former morning host Bob Ulm remains in the seat as News Director for all five stations in the cluster joining Sports Director Rick Burgei.

WDOH moved morning show co-host Jeff Wittler into the mid-day position where he runs his "Stress Free Workday" with insightful tips for living healthier, working better and being happier.

WDOH maintains the services of Lima radio veteran Jim Edwards (also known as Diesel) as part-time and fill ins. Jim currently anchors weekend duty at WDOH and other Maverick Media properties including 92.1 The Frog, 93.1 The Fan, 104.9 The Eagle, and 940 WCIT. Jim's long list of call letters in addition to his current stations include WLSR, WBUK, WIMA, WIMT, WMLX, WYRX, WZRX, WIMT, WUZZ, WLJM, and various others.

WDOH recently hired Sandy Bennett to serve as fill in and part-time staff. Sandy has been on the air in Columbus at AC powerhouse WSNY along with nights in Cleveland at WMJI and co-host mornings at KODA Houston for nearly 10 years.

WDOH also added John Tesh for afternoon drive and Delilah weeknights from 7 p.m.-midnight. The station also airs Your Weekend with Jim Brickman. Brickman works for WDOK in Cleveland and other various AC stations throughout the country. The show airs on Saturdays following John Tesh.

WDOH is the sports broadcast arm for Delphos Jefferson and Delphos Saint Johns sports. The station airs Scott Shannon on Sundays from 12-4 p.m.

Effective July 1, 2013, Childers Media Group LLC purchased WDOH with the Lima cluster of Maverick Media LLC at a price of $2.1 million. They moved its offices and studios from its Cable Rd. location to 57 Town Square in downtown Lima on September 18, 2013.

Effective February 15, 2018, Childers Media sold WDOH and four sister stations to Woof Boom Radio for $2.425 million.

== Previous logo ==
(WDOH's logo under previous soft AC format)
