= K10OI =

Marina, California; United States
- Channels: Analog: 5 (VHF)

Programming
- Affiliations: Tele Vida Abundante (?-present)

Ownership
- Owner: J B Broadcasting

History
- Founded: April 5, 1996
- Former call signs: K05KS (temporary channel 5 call signs)
- Former affiliations: HSN

Technical information
- Facility ID: 68665
- ERP: 0.75 kW

K10OI was a low-power television station in Marina, California, broadcasting locally on channel 5 as an affiliate of Tele Vida Abundante. Founded April 5, 1996, the station was owned by J B Broadcasting.

The station originally broadcast on channel 10 until August 14, 2001, when it was forced to cease operations to accommodate for KSBW's digital channel. It has since broadcast on channel 5 via special temporary authority by the FCC.
