= WIMA (AM) =

- Lima, Ohio; United States
- Frequency: 1150 kHz
- Branding: NewsRadio 1150 WIMA

Programming
- Format: News/talk
- Affiliations: ABC News Radio; Fox News Radio; Compass Media Networks; Premiere Networks; Cincinnati Bengals Radio Network; Ohio State Sports Network; Indianapolis Motor Speedway Radio Network

Ownership
- Owner: iHeartMedia, Inc.; (iHM Licenses, LLC)
- Sister stations: WBKS; WIMT; WMLX; WZRX-FM

History
- First air date: December 5, 1948
- Call sign meaning: Lima

Technical information
- Licensing authority: FCC
- Facility ID: 37498
- Class: B
- Power: 1,000 watts
- Transmitter coordinates: 40°40′47.2″N 84°6′33.8″W

Links
- Public license information: Public file; LMS
- Webcast: Listen live (via iHeartRadio)
- Website: 1150wima.iheart.com

WIMA (1150 kHz) is a commercial AM radio station in Lima, Ohio, owned and operated by iHeartMedia, Inc. Its studio's and office are located on West Market Street, and its transmitter is located on McClain Road in Fort Shawnee. It is Lima's first and oldest commercial radio station. The call sign, when spoken like a word rhymes with the city of Lima, which is pronounced with a long "i" sound, unlike the capital city of Peru.

== History ==
WIMA took to the air on December 5, 1948, as Lima's outlet for the Mutual Broadcasting System. The AM station debuted six months after the FM adjunct, WIMA-FM (102.1), signed on.

Starting in radio under the leadership of the Hoosier Schoolmaster of the Air, Dr. Clarence M. Morgan, long time Lima broadcast legend Easter Straker was program director for many years in addition to hosting "Easter's Parade" a live mid-day program on WIMA and on Channel 35.'"Easter's Parade" was a midday show similar to the popular Ruth Lyons show out of Cincinnati. Talk and topics were aimed at the women, mothers and children that were the early watchers of the 1950s. Straker would discuss national, state and local issues with the Lima woman in mind. She instituted the "Teddy Bear Fund" with the local hospitals. This was to provide funds for Teddy Bears to every child admitted to Lima hospitals. One way to raise funds was to invite children to come down to the studio to be interviewed by Easter while sitting in her "birthday chair." While they were being questioned she would ask if they brought any tax stamps for the Teddy Bear. The tax stamps were then used to buy Teddy bears for sick children. In return children were offered the chance to help themselves to pennies in a giant glass jar. The handful of pennies to a young person was a thrill. The TV show continued until 1984, and the radio show until 1991, ending a few months before Straker's death in April 1992 from colon cancer at age 73.

WIMA, along with WLOK (1240 AM), held construction permits for UHF stations; WIMA for channel 35 and WLOK for channel 73. After the death of WLOK's majority owner Lloyd Pixley, WIMA parent company Northwestern Ohio Broadcasting bought WLOK radio and television, taking WLOK's programming and airstaff and moving it to the channel 35 permit. WLOK radio signed off permanently and the license was surrendered, due to then-existing FCC regulations prohibiting duopolies on the AM band in the same market. WLOK-TV was relaunched as WIMA-TV (channel 35) on April 24, 1955.

WIMA was granted a 24-hour license in 1970. WIMA-FM switched to a pre-recorded country music format in 1974, while WIMA continued its "middle-of-the-road" format, with disc jockeys Alan DeBoer "Ace Alan", Tom Francis, Joe Jansen "J.J.", G. Arthur Versnick "Versnick on the Radio", and Andy Wetherall, under program director and deejay Jack Stower "J.S.", and station manager Les Rau. Around that time WIMA's MOR format evolved from traditional "old-line" MOR to a more contemporary flavor, the forerunner of today's adult contemporary music format.

In April 1974, Jack Stower moved from WIMA to WIMA-FM (Country Lovin'), to become that station's first manager. Mr. Stower was succeeded by Joe Jansen as WIMA program director. WIMA-FM is now known as WIMT "T-102". The former WIMA-TV (now WLIO) was sold off in 1972 to Lima Communications Corporation, a division of Toledo-based Block Communications, owners of the Toledo Blade newspaper.

The WBLY call sign later moved to an AM station in Springfield, Ohio, where it resided from 1954 to 2002 which is now WULM.

WIMA along with four other Clear Channel Lima radio stations were initially sold to Florida-based GoodRadio.TV LLC in May 2007, but the deal soon collapsed prior to FCC approval. The most recent proposed deal was to banker American Securities under the new name Frequency Licensing Partners LLC, but it has yet to be completed or approved. As of 2009, these stations (except WBUK) remain in Clear Channel's hands.

== WIMA today ==
former logo

WIMA, outside of a local morning show, airs a lineup of syndicated programs (mostly from Premiere Networks) similar to many other iHeart talk stations, including shows hosted by Glenn Beck, Clay Travis and Buck Sexton, Sean Hannity, Jesse Kelly, and Coast to Coast AM with George Noory.

== See also ==
- List of radio stations in Ohio
