= Jim Baldridge =

American journalist

Jim Baldridge is an American former newscaster and co-anchor for WHIO-TV's Newscenter 7 in Dayton, Ohio.

== Biography ==
Baldridge was raised in Lima, Ohio. He attended Shawnee High School, and is a graduate of Wright State University and Sinclair Community College.

Baldridge began covering news at WCIT radio in Lima, Ohio, in 1964 as a senior in high school. He worked for several stations in the Dayton-Springfield area (including WIZE under the pseudonym "Gregg Baldwin") and served in the Army with the United States Armed Forces Radio and Television Service in the Pacific.

Baldridge joined WHIO-TV in 1972 as a general assignment reporter. In 1977 Baldridge began anchoring with Dayton broadcast legend Don Wayne, whom he had grown up watching. He later worked alongside Cheryl McHenry and Letitia Perry. During his years at WHIO Jim Baldridge traveled the world to cover stories important to the Dayton area. Special assignments took him to China, Vietnam, Nicaragua, El Salvador, Japan, Colombia, and throughout Europe, including covering the Fall of the Berlin Wall. He also covered major stories in the US, such as the 1989 San Francisco earthquake and the Oklahoma City bombing, as well as many political events.

Baldridge retired in the fall of 2009 after a career as one of the most durable local news anchors on any station in the United States.

== Dayton Air Show affiliation ==
Jim Baldridge has a strong interest in aviation. He anchored Dayton Air Show broadcasts for 26 years from 1975. In the 1980s and 1990's, WHIO-TV's coverage of the air show was broadcast by hundreds of stations nationwide and in several foreign countries.

== Awards ==
Baldridge has received many awards for his work in broadcast journalism. He has been honored by the Society of Professional Journalists, the National Academy of Television Arts and Sciences (the "Emmy" Awards), The Aviation and Space Writers Association, the National Association of Television Program Executives, and many local organizations. Sinclair Community College presented him with its Alumni Association Service Award, and Shawnee High School presented him with its Distinguished Alumni Award in 1989.

== Personal life ==
Baldridge and his wife Sue now live in Florida. They have two grown children and four grandchildren.
