= WZRX-FM =

- Fort Shawnee, Ohio; United States
- Broadcast area: Lima, Ohio
- Frequency: 107.5 MHz
- Branding: 107.5 The Big Buck

Programming
- Format: Oldies
- Affiliations: Premiere Networks

Ownership
- Owner: iHeartMedia, Inc.; (iHM Licenses, LLC)
- Sister stations: WIMA, WIMT, WMLX, WBKS

History
- First air date: 1991
- Former call signs: WFSO (1988–1991, CP); WBUK (1991–2002)

Technical information
- Licensing authority: FCC
- Facility ID: 8061
- Class: A
- ERP: 1,350 watts
- HAAT: 151 meters (495 ft)

Links
- Public license information: Public file; LMS
- Webcast: Listen live (via iHeartRadio)
- Website: 1075thebigbuck.iheart.com

WZRX-FM (107.5 FM) is a commercial radio station broadcasting an oldies format. Licensed to Fort Shawnee, Ohio, United States, the station serves the Lima area. The station is currently owned by iHeartMedia, Inc. Its studios and offices are located on West Market Street in Lima, Ohio, with its transmitter located in Fort Shawnee.

== History ==
The frequency originally was WBUK "Oldies 107.5 The Big Buck", signing on in 1991. The oldies format moved to 106.3 in Ottawa, Ohio in August 2002 (originally WPNM) with the new active rock format and the WZRX calls in place also since 2002. Phil Austin was the first program director of "The X", which was launched to serve the large active rock audience in Lima.

In the fall of 2002, WZRX debuted with Bob and Tom in the Morning, Mike Edwards in Midday, Dave Crosser in afternoons, Eric Michaels at night and Jim O'Reilly (Now Jimmy The Governor) overnights. The station overtook Fort Wayne-based WBYR in Lima in just one ratings period.

Since then, iHeartMedia, Inc. has reformatted the station several times. Currently the station airs a 1990s-leaning classic rock format with Rover's Morning Glory in morning drive, Theresa Rockface mid-days, Jimmy The Governor afternoons and Nikki Sixx evenings.

On December 13, 2021, at 5:55 AM, after playing "In the End" by Linkin Park and "Closing Time" by Semisonic, WZRX-FM abruptly dropped their longtime rock format and flipped to a '60s and '70s-heavy oldies format, branded as "107.5 The Big Buck", calling back to the format the station launched with in 1991. The first song on The Big Buck was "I'm a Believer" by The Monkees.

The call letters WZRX are shared with an AM station at 1590 kHz in Jackson, Mississippi.

== See also ==
- List of radio stations in Ohio
