= WLIO =

Television station in Lima, Ohio

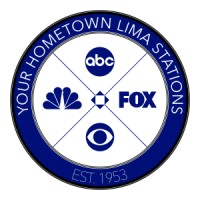
- Lima, Ohio; United States
- Channels: Digital: 8 (VHF); Virtual: 8
- Branding: NBC Lima; Your News Now; Fox Lima (8.2)

Programming
- Affiliations: 8.1: NBC; 8.2: Fox/MyNetworkTV

Ownership
- Owner: Gray Media; (Gray Television Licensee, LLC)
- Sister stations: WOHL-CD, WAMS-LD, WPNM-LD

History
- First air date: April 18, 1953
- Former call signs: WLOK-TV (1953–1955); WIMA-TV (1955–1971)
- Former channel numbers: Analog: 73 (UHF, 1953–1955), 35 (UHF, 1955–2009); Digital: 20 (UHF, 2000–2001); Virtual: 35 (2000–2009)
- Former affiliations: DuMont (secondary, 1953–1955); CBS (secondary, 1953–1972); ABC (secondary, 1954–1982); The CW (35.2, via The CW Plus, 2006–2008)
- Call sign meaning: Lima, Ohio

Technical information
- Licensing authority: FCC
- Facility ID: 37503
- ERP: 40 kW
- HAAT: 170 m (558 ft)
- Transmitter coordinates: 40°46′31.6″N 84°7′14.2″W

Links
- Public license information: Public file; LMS
- Website: hometownstations.com

WLIO (channel 8) is a television station in Lima, Ohio, United States, affiliated with NBC and Fox. It is owned by Gray Media alongside WOHL-CD (channel 35), which broadcasts ABC and CBS. The two stations (and two repeaters)—which all operate under the collective banner of "Your Hometown Stations"—share studios on Rice Avenue northwest of downtown; WLIO's transmitter is located on Saint Clair Avenue north of downtown.

WLIO began broadcasting as WLOK-TV on ultra high frequency (UHF) channel 73 in 1953. It was co-owned with WLOK radio. In 1954, the WLOK stations were bought by the WIMA stations, with WLOK radio being shut down; the following year, WLOK-TV became WIMA-TV and moved to channel 35, for which WIMA had previously filed. In 1971, the radio and television stations were split, with channel 35 changing its call sign to WLIO before being sold to Block Communications. The station was Lima's only major network affiliate into the 1990s and its primary source of local news and television advertising. In 2009, Block acquired WOHL and the Fox, ABC, and CBS affiliations in the market; WLIO changed major channel numbers to 8 and began broadcasting NBC and Fox, while WOHL became the ABC and CBS affiliate. The news department produces local newscasts which are aired on all four subchannels. Gray Media purchased Block's television stations in 2026.

== History ==
=== Early years ===
After the Federal Communications Commission (FCC) lifted its "freeze of 1948" for any additional television stations, WLOK, Inc., owner of WLOK (1240 AM) and WLOK-FM (103.3), filed an application on June 25, 1952, to broadcast on the ultra high frequency (UHF) band; WLOK was one of 95 such filings across the country. As part of the application, WLOK proposed expanding the transmitter site of the radio stations—in use since their December 1936 launch—to house both television and radio production. WLOK's transmitter was located on a parcel of land at the intersection of Rice and Woodlawn Avenues, which necessitated a rezoning from residential to commercial. The FCC granted a permit for WLOK on November 20, 1952, to operate on channel 73; competing stations WIMA/WIMA-FM also applied for a permit and received one several weeks later on channel 35, initially planning to house WIMA-TV at the Cook Tower in Lima's downtown. WLOK-TV took to the air on April 18, 1953, becoming one of the first UHF stations to operate in the United States. George E. Condon, television critic for The Plain Dealer in Cleveland, witnessed WLOK-TV's debut and praised the station for persevering through construction despite a factory strike preventing the station from getting all the necessary transmitter equipment in time.

In addition to live local shows, WLOK-TV carried programming from NBC, CBS and DuMont, all initially via kinescope and film. NBC filed a request to connect the station into the Bell System coaxial cable network, and by September 1953, WLOK was carrying network programs live via microwave relay, signing on every day at noon.

WLOK radio and television was majority-owned by Lloyd Pixley, a famed Ohio State football player who purchased the radio stations from Fort Industry Broadcasting in 1951. In early November 1953, Pixley issued additional stock in WLOK, Inc., to Columbus-based interests that already held a stake in the stations, reducing his share to 34 percent. Several days later, Pixley suffered a heart attack while watching the 1953 Ohio State–Michigan game and was hospitalized ever since; Pixley died on July 30, 1954, at the age of 54. The same day, WLOK personnel were notified that the stations were in the process of being sold, but the buyer's name was not revealed. The buyer was named on October 30 as the Northwestern Ohio Broadcasting Company, parent of WIMA-AM-FM, acquiring WLOK for $750 in stock and $188,691 in assumed obligations.

As part of the deal, WLOK's license was to be shut down and the license surrendered due to FCC regulations banning one company from owning more than one AM station in a market. The FCC approved the deal on December 1, 1954, and WLOK ceased broadcasting seven days later. No loss in personnel took place, and Northwestern kept both WIMA and WLOK-TV operating at their existing studios. Northwestern applied to "move" WLOK-TV to channel 35 on December 7, 1954; the move took place on April 24, 1955, and the station was renamed WIMA-TV. A move to channel 14 was also considered, but Northwestern opted to expedite the process by utilizing their existing channel 35 permit. Owing to WIMA's existing affiliation with ABC Radio, the station contracted to carry select ABC shows in late 1954, which it informally had been doing since earlier in the year. DuMont ceased its existence as a network in 1955.

In its early years, the station had a range of local programs, including a local franchise of Romper Room, two other children's programs, and Little League Baseball broadcast from a ballfield at the studio site which was known as "Telecast Field", as well as the long-running Easter's Parade and Blue Flame Theater. By 1962, it was no longer a CBS affiliate.

One of the longest-running local programs originating from the WIMA-TV era was The Ric Bratton Show, a talk show that debuted in 1969; Bratton, who had joined the station in 1967 and also served as a telethon host, news anchor, and announcer, was fired in 2002 amid a felony theft trial.

=== Split from radio ===
In 1971, the owners of the WIMA stations opted to sell, splitting the radio and television operations. In June 1971, the locally owned Lima Broadcasting Corporation acquired WIMA-AM-FM. As a result, the news staffs for radio and television were split. Channel 35 could no longer use the WIMA-TV call sign and changed to WLIO-TV on September 1. WLIO was sold to the Lima Communications Corporation, headed by three businessmen from Toledo, two associated with the Toledo Blade newspaper and the third with Midwestern Broadcasting, owners of Toledo radio station WOHO. After receiving FCC approval for the $1.5 million purchase, the new owners assumed control on February 1, 1972. Midwestern Broadcasting sold its stake in the station to Blade Communications (also known as Block Communications) in 1982.

Under Lima Communications, the station was stable in upper management. Jim Dages served as general manager from 1976 until he died of a heart attack in 1995; George Dunster served as news director from 1973 to 1999. As Lima's only major network affiliate, it enjoyed high ratings; in November 2000, its 6 and 11 p.m. newscasts had the highest share of household viewing in any market in the U.S. Because Lima was a trading center for an area larger than its television market, the station benefitted from Lima's outsized retail sales per capita. WLIO's digital signal on VHF channel 8 signed on in 2002.

=== From one network to four ===
Over the course of the 2000s, WLIO gained a new competitor. In 1994, W67CA, previously a low-power independent station based in Van Wert, relaunched as Fox affiliate WOHL-LP. Under Metro Video Productions, WOHL began producing news in 2001 and added other major networks on additional low-power stations: CBS on WLMO-LP in 2004 and ABC on WLQP-LP in 2006. In 2007, WOHL overtook WLIO in prime time, a historic first.

However, financial issues at WOHL and a desire for carriage on a full-power station with a larger coverage area led Fox to consider moving its affiliation to WLIO as early as late 2007. On June 30, 2008, Metro Video Productions sued Block Communications, alleging that Block was interfering with WOHL's relationship with Fox by lobbying the network to change affiliates. Greg Phipps, owner of Metro, alleged that WOHL's three-year affiliation renewal was nearing completion when Block began talking to the network; the contract had special provisions allowing Fox to move to a full-power station such as WLIO on 60 days' notice. A judge imposed a temporary injunction preventing Block and Fox from reaching an agreement.

Metro Video sold WLMO, WLQP and WOHL, as well as WFND-LP in Findlay, on November 29, 2008, to West Central Ohio Broadcasting, a Block subsidiary. The deal placed all Big Four television networks affiliations under the same owner, permissible as all three stations were low-power. The $2.4 million sale agreement also ended the pending litigation between the parties; it was initially stated that Block would not close the Metro Video Productions facilities on South Central Avenue and consolidate them with WLIO, but after the sale was completed in February 2009, operations of all stations were consolidated at WLIO's studios on Rice Avenue in several phases.

The acquisition of the Metro Video stations and the concurrent conversion to digital television brought major changes to Block's local offerings. In June 2009, WLIO changed to major channel 8, broadcasting NBC on 8.1 and Fox on 8.2, and the analog signal on channel 35 was shut down on June 12. WOHL-CD, using major channel 35, began broadcasting ABC and CBS in digital format by August.

=== Sale to Gray Media ===
On August 1, 2025, Gray Media announced it would acquire all of Block's broadcast television stations, including WLIO and its low-power siblings, WOHL-CD, WAMS-LD and WPNM-LD, for $80 million. The sale was approved by the FCC on May 6, 2026, and completed the same day.

== News operation ==
The total news output of the Hometown Stations group is 22 hours a week, with hour-long weekday newscasts at 6 a.m. and noon and half-hour newscasts at 5, 6, 10, and 11 p.m., plus 6 and 11 p.m. newscasts on weekends. The morning newscast is aired on NBC and ABC, the noon news on NBC, the 5 and 10 p.m. news on Fox, and the 6 and 11 p.m. news on ABC, CBS, and NBC. The weekend newscasts air only on the NBC channel.

=== Past on-air staff ===
- Adrian Cronauer
- Michael Reghi

== Subchannels ==
WLIO's transmitter is north of Lima along St. Clair Avenue. The station's signal is multiplexed:

Subchannels of WLIO
Subchannel	Res.	Short name	Programming
8.1	720p	WLIONBC	NBC
8.2	720p	WLIOFOX	Fox (primary); MyNetworkTV (secondary)

== See also ==
- Channel 8 digital TV stations in the United States
- Channel 8 virtual TV stations in the United States
