= WOHL-CD =

Television station in Lima, Ohio

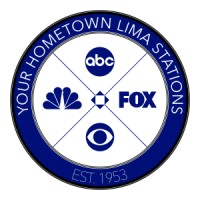
- Lima, Ohio; United States
- Channels: Digital: 15 (UHF); Virtual: 35
- Branding: ABC Lima (35.1); CBS Lima (35.2); Your News Now

Programming
- Affiliations: 35.1: ABC; 35.2: CBS

Ownership
- Owner: Gray Media; (Gray Television Licensee, LLC)
- Sister stations: WLIO

History
- Founded: January 26, 1989
- Former call signs: W67CA (1989–1995); WOHL-LP (1995–2002); WOHL-CA (2002–2009)
- Former channel numbers: Analog: 67 (UHF, 1989–1999), 25 (UHF, 1999–2009); Digital: 35 (UHF, 2009–2019)
- Former affiliations: Independent (January–October 1989); Fox (October 1989–2009); MyNetworkTV (secondary, 2006–2009)
- Call sign meaning: "Ohio Lima"

Technical information
- Licensing authority: FCC
- Facility ID: 68549
- Class: CD
- ERP: 11.5 kW
- HAAT: 178.6 m (586 ft)
- Transmitter coordinates: 40°46′31.6″N 84°7′14.2″W
- Translator(s): WPNM-LD 27 Leipsic; WAMS-LD 29 Minster–New Bremen

Links
- Public license information: Public file; LMS
- Website: www.hometownstations.com

WOHL-CD (channel 35) is a low-power, Class A television station in Lima, Ohio, United States, affiliated with ABC and CBS. Owned by Gray Media, it is sister to full-power dual NBC/Fox affiliate WLIO (channel 8). The two stations (and two repeaters)—which all operate under the collective banner of "Your Hometown Stations"—share studios on Rice Avenue northwest of downtown; WOHL-CD's transmitter is located on Saint Clair Avenue north of downtown.

== History ==
The station signed on January 26, 1989, with the calls W67CA. It aired an analog signal on UHF channel 67 from a transmitter west of Cridersville in Auglaize County. The low-power outlet was initially an independent but joined Fox on October 9. In 1995, the station changed frequencies to UHF channel 25 while adopting the call sign WOHL-LP.

W18BP launched on May 28, 1996, as a full-time repeater of this station. This was followed by another translator, W65DP, on September 22, 1998. W18BP broke off from the simulcast in 1999 and became low-power UPN affiliate WLQP-LP (that station eventually joined ABC when UPN closed in 2006). W65DP would follow suit in 2002, becoming CBS affiliate WLMO-LP. Also that year, channel 25 upgraded to Class A status with the call sign WOHL-CA. All three stations maintained facilities on South Central Avenue in Downtown Lima.

On September 5, 2006, WOHL added MyNetworkTV as a secondary affiliate. It aired programming from the network Monday through Saturday nights from 11 p.m. to 1 a.m. Eventually, Saturday shows were dropped.

Despite being a low-power station, WOHL would, by 2007, outrate long-dominant WLIO in the prime time ratings. This did not stop Fox from, later that year, entering into talks to move the network's programming to a WLIO subchannel, as despite WOHL's high ratings the network sought the increased reach of being on a full-power station. The talks led to WOHL suing in 2008 to block the talks; in a court testimony, WOHL owner Greg Phipps stated that "We won't be able to survive" if the station were stripped of its affiliation. The dispute was settled on November 29, when Phipps' company, Metro Video Productions, announced it would sell its stations (WOHL, WLQP, and WLMO) to West Central Ohio Broadcasting, a subsidiary of WLIO's then owner Block Communications. While Block assumed operational control of all three after the sale's completion, it was initially stated there would be no consolidation of newscasts or facilities with WLIO. It was then stated some consolidation would take place with WOHL, WLQP, and WLMO being integrated into WLIO's studios on Rice Avenue.

On June 12, 2009, a construction permit allowed WOHL to perform a "flash-cut" to digital and adopt the current calls WOHL-CD. It first operated its high definition digital signal on UHF channel 25, but due to possible interference with WRTV in Indianapolis, the station moved to channel 35 for its digital operations. The allotment previously served as WLIO's analog signal and virtual channel display.

Soon after on September 28, WLQP-LP (now WPNM-LD) and WLMO-LP (now WAMS-LD) terminated analog operations. Programming was shifted to WOHL with CBS on a new second digital subchannel and began to be offered in high definition for the first time. Block Communications then turned WPNM and WAMS into repeaters for WOHL (with all stations under the "ABC Lima" banner on 35.1 and the "CBS Lima" banner on 35.2) expanding its reach across the West Ohio TV market. Programming from Fox and MyNetworkTV had moved that July to WLIO 8.2.

On August 1, 2025, Gray Media announced it would acquire all of Block's broadcast television stations, including WOHL-CD, WAMS-LD, WPNM-LD and WLIO, for $80 million. The sale was approved by the FCC on May 6, 2026, and completed the same day.

== Newscasts ==
WLIO's one-hour weekday morning show at 6 a.m. is simulcast on 35.1, while WLIO's 6 and 11 p.m. weeknight newscasts are simulcast on both 35.1 and 35.2—all under the Your News Now banner. WOHL does not carry any weekend newscasts (on either 35.1 or 35.2) outside of network national news.

== Subchannels ==
The station's signal is multiplexed:

Subchannels of WOHL-CD, WPNM-LD, and WAMS-LD
Channel	Res.	Short name	Programming
35.1	720p	WOHLABC	ABC
35.2	720p	WOHLCBS	CBS

== See also ==
- Channel 15 digital TV stations in the United States
- Channel 15 low-power TV stations in the United States
- Channel 35 virtual TV stations in the United States
