= WFGF =

- Wapakoneta, Ohio; United States
- Broadcast area: Lima, Ohio
- Frequency: 92.1 MHz
- Branding: New Country 92.1 The Frog

Programming
- Format: Country
- Affiliations: Compass Media Networks; Westwood One

Ownership
- Owner: Woof Boom Radio; (Woof Boom Radio of Lima LLC)
- Sister stations: WCIT, WDOH, WEGE, WWSR

History
- First air date: July 1, 1964 (as WERM)
- Former call signs: WERM (1964–1978); WAXC (1978–1985); WZOQ (1985–2008); WWSR (2008–2009)
- Call sign meaning: FroGgy FM (former nickname)

Technical information
- Licensing authority: FCC
- Facility ID: 74293
- Class: A
- ERP: 3,000 watts
- HAAT: 100 meters
- Transmitter coordinates: 40°39′20.00″N 84°06′54.00″W

Links
- Public license information: Public file; LMS
- Webcast: Listen Live
- Website: 921thefrog.com

WFGF (92.1 FM, "92.1 The Frog") is a commercial radio station based in Wapakoneta, Ohio, broadcasting a country music format. Its studios are located in Lima, Ohio, with their transmitter located in Cridersville, Ohio, between Wapakoneta and Lima.

== History ==
Originally called WERM (for its main air personality Ernestine R. Miller, wife of the station's founder, Harry B. Miller, who was later with WHJM before she died in 2013) when it first began .broadcasting in 1964, under the licensee name West Central Ohio Broadcasters Inc.. WERM was a family owned and operated station located west of Wapakoneta on County Road 33-A (old U.S. Route 33) in Moulton which aired local news and sports. Its format was a mix of traditional middle of the road and beautiful music. In the mid-1970s the gradual shift towards contemporary pop began with the evening shift "6 to 10 Club" and occasional rock music. It also operated an in-house training school for local aspiring broadcasters along with jazz-formatted Xenia sister stations WELX (now southern gospel WGNZ in Fairborn) and WHBM-FM (now active rock WZDA in Beavercreek.)

In 1978 WERM was purchased by John A. Bulmer (dba:Bulmer Communications Inc.)who previously managed the former WPNM in Ottawa (now WBUK) with the call letters switched to WAXC (previously used at an AM station in Rochester, New York now WHIC) as "Waxcee 92 FM...Your Radio Station" putting greater emphasis on the Wapakoneta/St. Marys community while gradually moving closer to the Lima market when its transmitter was moved from its studios in Moulton to Cridersville in the early 1980s. The station's new owner went as far as installing newer audio equipment and airing major market-styled jingles produced by PAMS and JAM Creative Productions along with high energy production values giving it a more professional sound and image over the former WERM with a soft adult contemporary-day/Hot AC-evening format.

In 1981, WAXC's transmitter was moved to a new tower site located on east National Rd. in Cridersville to better cover Lima. When WAXC became WZOQ, the main studio was moved to Lima....hence the original WERM tower at Moulton was dismantled while the original 1960s "A-Frame" brick house studio building still stands next door to the former Swonger's Furniture City (now J & S Electronics) and is currently unoccupied.

After a short-lived format switch to an adult standards/pop oldies mix, WAXC was sold in 1986 to Arrow Communications who (under Bulmer's direction as General manager before his departure to WRQC Cleveland) changed the station's call sign to WZOQ "92 ZOO" which became Lima's outlet for Top 40 Hits. In 1991 the station was sold to Pennsylvania-based Keymarket and then to Forever Broadcasting in 1993 slowly moving the operation from the small 1960s-styled brick house in Moulton to a former KFC restaurant on Cable Road in Lima. It also added sister station WYRX later in 1993 both of whom eventually moved up the street to the former WCIT/WLSR-FM studios(now WCIT/WEGE respectively) when Forever purchased both stations and added country newcomer WFGF (formerly WYRX) to the new cluster operation which is where it is located today. Conor Goodson, an area teenager at the time (and now a successful renewable energy executive), was briefly employed as the station's mascot during the mid 90's, donning the purple parrot costume and waving at passers-by at the Cable Road location in Lima.

== Programming history ==
In 2003, WZOQ along with other Forever-owned Lima stations were sold to Connecticut-based Maverick Media and a year later purchased classic country WDOH in Delphos switching to a soft adult contemporary format. At midnight on April 2, 2007, the station was rebranded as "Star 92.1". A week later on April 9, 2007, its callsign was changed from WZOQ to WWSR. The WZOQ callsign was moved to its sister station at 940 AM, the former WLJM, before reverting to its original WCIT call sign in 2009.

On June 1, 2009, the sports/talk format on sister station WZOQ was moved over to the 93.1 FM facility, while the country music format and WFGF calls were moved to the 92.1 FM facility, replacing the soft AC "Star" format. WFGF since adjusted their on-air nickname, and are now referred to as "New Country 92.1 The Frog."

Effective July 1, 2013, WWSR and the rest of the Lima cluster of Maverick Media LLC was purchased by a local company, Childers Media Group LLC, at a price of $2.1 million; studios and offices were moved to 57 Town Square in downtown Lima.

Effective February 15, 2018, Childers Media Group sold WFGF and four sister stations to Woof Boom Radio of Lima LLC for $2.425 million.

== Station ownership ==
- 1965-1978 WEST CENTRAL OHIO BROADCASTERS INC. (as WERM)

also owned WELX/WHBM-FM Xenia

- 1978-1986 BULMER COMMUNICATIONS INC.(as WAXC)
- 1986-1991 ARROW COMMUNICATIONS (as WZOQ)

also owned WZNY Augusta, WTNN-A/WFFX-F Tuscaloosa, WFRG A/F Utica, KLIO Quad Cities, KZBB Ft. Smith, KHUM Topeka, WENI-A/WZKZ-F Corning

- 1991-1993 KEYMARKET COMMUNICATIONS

also owned stations in Pittsburgh, Wheeling and Riverside Calif.

- 1993-2003 FOREVER BROADCASTING LLC

also owned stations in Altoona, Johnstown, State College and Meadville

- 2003-2013 MAVERICK MEDIA LLC (as WWSR)

also owns stations in Santa Rosa Calif, Eau Claire WI and Rockford Ill.

- 2013–2017 CHILDERS MEDIA GROUP LLC

with offices and studios moved to 57 Town Square in downtown Lima.

- 2017–present WOOF BOOM RADIO

== See also ==
- Froggy (brand)
