= WWSR =

- Lima, Ohio; United States
- Broadcast area: Lima, Ohio
- Frequency: 93.1 MHz
- Branding: 93.1 The Fan

Programming
- Format: Sports
- Affiliations: ESPN Radio

Ownership
- Owner: Woof Boom Radio; (Woof Boom Radio of Lima LLC)
- Sister stations: WCIT, WDOH, WEGE, WFGF

History
- First air date: 1993 (as WYRX)
- Former call signs: WYRX (1993–1998); WFRY (1998); WFGF (1998–2009)
- Call sign meaning: WW Sports Radio

Technical information
- Licensing authority: FCC
- Facility ID: 74294
- Class: A
- ERP: 3,000 watts
- HAAT: 97 meters
- Transmitter coordinates: 40°45′47.1″N 84°10′58.8″W

Links
- Public license information: Public file; LMS
- Webcast: Listen Live
- Website: 931TheFan.com

WWSR (93.1 FM, "93.1 The Fan") is a commercial radio station in Lima, Ohio, broadcasting a sports format.

== History ==
WWSR (previously WFGF) was founded in August 1985 as WYRX "93 Rocks"(later 93-X and briefly as WFRY) which would become a sister station to WZOQ at first with an album-oriented rock format and transmits with 3,000 watts E.R.P. Its studios were shared with WZOQ in a building which previously housed a KFC restaurant on Cable Road in Lima. Its transmitter is located on Baty Rd. When Forever Broadcasting purchased the former WCIT-AM and WLSR-FM, the studios were moved up the street into the location of the AM/FM combo now known respectively as the resurrected WCIT (AM) with an oldies format and classic rock WEGE-FM. The call letter and format switch to WFGF "Froggy 93" took place in March 1998. Although, Froggy did make a brief country format appearance in 1993 and changed back to the rock format, 93-X. Froggy 93 continued its local country music following in Lima.

The WFGF callsign and country format was moved to 92.1 in May 2009 as the new branding "92.1 The Frog."

== Station ownership ==
- 1993 - 2003 FOREVER BROADCASTING LLC - also owned stations in Altoona, Johnstown, State College and Meadville
- 2003 - 2013 MAVERICK MEDIA LLC - also owns stations in Santa Rosa Calif, Eau Claire WI and Rockford Ill.
- 2013 - 2017 CHILDERS MEDIA GROUP LLC - a Lima-based company
- 2017–present WOOF BOOM RADIO

== Change to sports radio ==
On June 1, 2009, the sports/talk format on sister station WZOQ was moved over to the 93.1 FM facility, while the country music format and WFGF calls were moved to the 92.1 FM facility, replacing the soft AC "Star" format. The 940 AM facility assumed an oldies format and reverted to its original WCIT callsign. "93.1 The Fan" carries the programming of the national sports network ESPN Radio. Some local sports programming included "SportsTalk With Koza" hosted by former WLIO-TV sports director Vince Koza, and "Sportsrap with Matt and Matt."

Effective July 1, 2013, WWSR and its sister stations were sold by Maverick Media LLC to a local company, Childers Media Group LLC, at a price of $2.1 million; its studios and offices were moved to new facilities located at 57 Town Square in downtown Lima. In 2017, Childers Media was purchased by former Maverick Media LLC General Manager J. Chapman and Woof Boom Radio which is based in Muncie Indiana with clusters in Muncie, Anderson and Lafayette.
