= WREP-LD =

Television station in Martinsville, Indiana

- Martinsville, Indiana; United States
- Channels: Digital: 15 (UHF); Virtual: 15

Programming
- Affiliations: 15.1: YTA TV; 15.2: Sports; 15.3: Weather info

Ownership
- Owner: Metropolitan School District of Martinsville

History
- First air date: August 1, 1990
- Former call signs: W15AY (1990–1995); WREP-LP (1995–2009)
- Former affiliations: America One (until 2015)
- Call sign meaning: Was owned by The Daily Reporter newspaper

Technical information
- Licensing authority: FCC
- Facility ID: 55759
- Class: LD
- ERP: 0.2 kW
- HAAT: 78.9 m (259 ft)
- Transmitter coordinates: 39°26′43.1″N 86°25′5.9″W

Links
- Public license information: LMS

WREP-LD (channel 15) is a low-power television station in Martinsville, Indiana, United States, affiliated with YTA TV. The station is owned by the Metropolitan School District of Martinsville and managed by students at Martinsville High School.

The station went on the air in 1990 as W15AY, affiliated with FamilyNet and similar services. It produced local programming for the Martinsville area. The next year, Reporter-Times Inc., publisher of The Daily Reporter newspaper in Martinsville, acquired the station. It continued the local programming until 1992, dropping it due to low viewership and lack of access to the city's cable system. Once the cable system added the station, local programming resumed. The newspaper was acquired in 1998, and in lieu of closing WREP-LP, new owner Schurz Communications donated it to Martinsville High School. The station airs student-produced programming, including local sports.

== History ==
Randy Manley built the station as W15AY and put it on the air on August 1, 1990. It was programmed with a family-friendly lineup, using the FamilyNet and Keystone Inspirational networks as well as The Learning Channel, as well as several locally produced shows. It was sold effective February 1, 1991, to The Reporter-Times Inc., publisher of newspapers in Martinsville; Manley remained with the station after the sale.

The station struggled in its early years to obtain a channel on Martinsville's cable system. The city of Martinsville requested that TCI add the channel in 1991, but it never did. As a result, Reporter-Times discontinued local programming in 1992. The next year, it filed a federal antitrust lawsuit against TCI. In December 1994, the city voted to join the lawsuit against TCI. TCI settled the lawsuit in 1995 and agreed to place channel 15 on its lineup.

With cable access, Reporter-Times Inc. moved to resume producing local programming on channel 15. The station became WREP-LP and affiliated with America One.

Reporter-Times Inc. was purchased by Schurz Communications, publisher of the Bloomington Herald-Times, in March 1998. Schurz opted to focus on the newspapers and considered closing WREP-LP. Instead, it offered the station to the school system of Martinsville. The transfer took place in February 1999; TV newscasts produced by the newspaper were discontinued, while Martinsville High School planned to produce athletic events and other school-related programming. Some shows were produced by high school students, including sports events, as well as other material not telecast on the station but used by units in the high school.

In July 2009, WREP-LP converted to digital broadcasting, only slightly later than full-service stations, and began adding material from America One to fill several digital subchannels.

== Subchannels ==
The station's signal is multiplexed:

Subchannels of WREP-LD
Channel	Res.	Short name	Programming
15.1	480i	WREP 1	YTA TV (4:3)
15.2	480i	WREP 2	Sports (4:3)
15.3	480i	WREP 3	Weather info (4:3)
