= Reporter-Times =

Newspaper based in Indiana, US

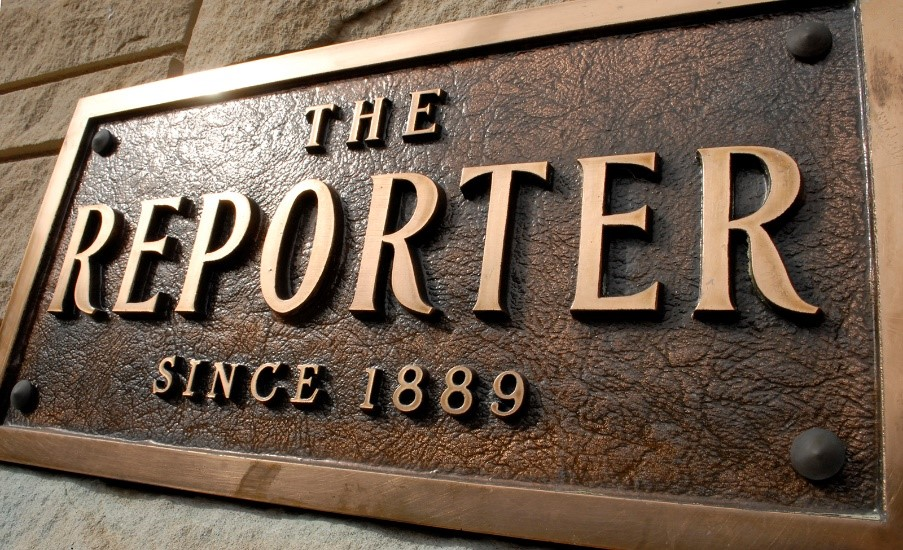
- Plaque outside of the Reporter-Times
- Type: Daily newspaper
- Format: Broadsheet
- Owner: USA Today Co.
- Founder: James G. Bain
- Founded: August 1889
- Headquarters: Martinsville, Indiana
- Circulation: 2,500
- Website: www.reporter-times.com

The Reporter-Times is a newspaper based in Morgan County, Indiana, United States. It is headquartered in Martinsville.

== History ==
The Reporter-Times was founded as The Daily Reporter, in August 1889 by James G. Bain. James G Bain was the editor of the Morgan County Republican newspaper in 1870. The Morgan County Republican was founded by a group of local Republican Party leaders, which was initiated as a reaction to the Gazette's switch from the ranks of the Republican Party to that of the Democratic Party. In December 1870, Bain and Henry Smock bought the paper, and Bain retained control of the journal after Smock departed in September 1874. On November 19, 1874, the paper title was shortened to the Republican. In March 1889 the Republican publication frequency was changed to twice-weekly. In August 1889 Bain acquired the Daily Reporter and transformed it to a daily edition of the Republican. The Republican was then changed back to a weekly publication. Bain had become the publisher for both journals: the Daily Reporter and the Republican. In July 1892, Bain sold both publications to Francis T. Singleton. Harry J. Martin purchased the journals in May 1912, and sold them to the Reporter Publishing Company in 1946. The company was led by Wilber L. Kendall and his associates, who decided to discontinue the Republican but continue to publish the Daily Reporter. The Daily Reporter newspaper went through a series of name changes. Its first official name was the Daily Reporter. It was later changed to the Martinsville Daily Reporter from 1946 to 1974. The paper then was changed to the Reporter from 1974 to 1999. In 1999 it changed its name to The Reporter-Times as it is known today. The Reporter-Times printed a letter from the assistant police chief which showed the racial insensitivity of the town but never printed their opinion on the letter.
