= WLCU (FM) =

Radio station at Campbellsville University in Campbellsville, Kentucky

- Campbellsville, Kentucky; United States
- Frequency: 88.7 MHz
- Branding: 88.7 The Tiger

Programming
- Format: College radio; Christian radio

Ownership
- Owner: Campbellsville University
- Sister stations: WLCU-CD

History
- First air date: 2011

Technical information
- Licensing authority: FCC
- Facility ID: 176645
- Class: A
- ERP: 800 watts
- HAAT: 63 meters (207 ft)
- Transmitter coordinates: 37°20′39″N 85°21′34″W

Links
- Public license information: Public file; LMS
- Webcast: Listen live (via TuneIn)
- Website: wlcufm.com

WLCU (88.7 FM) is a Christian radio and College radio–formatted radio station licensed to Campbellsville, Kentucky, United States. The station is locally–owned by Campbellsville University in conjunction with low-power television station WLCU-CD (channel 15).

== History ==
The construction permit for WLCU was given in 2007. However, it would not be until 2011 that the station went on-the-air.
