= Tele Vida Abundante =

Spanish-language TV network

- Type: Broadcast television network
- Country: United States
- Launch date: 1985
- Official website: Radio Vida Abundante

Tele Vida Abundante is a Spanish-language religious network with mostly low-powered television affiliates across certain areas of the United States, mostly in the west.

The network also broadcasts on free-to-air satellites Sat-Mex 5, covering from southern Canada to Argentina.

== List of Affiliates ==
Most channels listed here are low-powered.

Market/City Of License	Station/Channel No.	Current Owner/Licensee
Anaheim, California	KDOC-TV 56.8	Tri-State Christian Television
Yuma, Arizona	KYUM-LD 15	Centro Cristiano Vida Abundante
