= WPNM-LD =

Television station in Leipsic, Ohio

Translator of WOHL-CD, Lima, Ohio
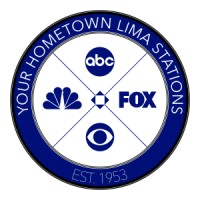
- Leipsic, Ohio (Note: Originally licensed to Lima, Ohio; moved to Leipsic in 2019.); United States
- Channels: Digital: 27 (UHF); Virtual: 35
- Branding: see WOHL-CD

Programming
- Affiliations: 35.1: ABC; 35.2: CBS

Ownership
- Owner: Gray Media; (Gray Television Licensee, LLC)
- Sister stations: WAMS-LD, WOHL-CD, WLIO

History
- Founded: May 28, 1996
- Former call signs: W18BP (1996–1999); WLQP-LP (1999–2018)
- Former channel number: Analog: 18 (UHF, 1996–2009), 25 (UHF, 2010−2019)
- Former affiliations: Fox (via WOHL-CA, 1996–1999); UPN (1999–2006); America One (secondary)

Technical information
- Licensing authority: FCC
- Facility ID: 21476
- Class: LD
- ERP: 15 kW
- HAAT: 134.9 m (443 ft)
- Transmitter coordinates: 41°8′12″N 83°54′24″W

Links
- Public license information: LMS
- Website: www.hometownstations.com

WPNM-LD (channel 35) is a low-power television station in Leipsic, Ohio, United States. It is a translator of Lima-based Class A dual ABC/CBS affiliate WOHL-CD (channel 35) which is owned by Gray Media, and is also sister to full-power dual NBC/Fox affiliate WLIO (channel 8). WPNM-LD's transmitter is located on the WBGU-TV tower near Belmore, Ohio; its parent station shares studios with WLIO on Rice Avenue northwest of downtown Lima.

== History ==
The station's previous logo.

The station signed on May 28, 1996, with the calls W18BP as a full-time translator of sister station WOHL-CA (now WOHL-CD). It aired an analog signal on UHF channel 18. The channel was spun off in 1999 and became a UPN affiliate in 1999 with the calls WLQP-LP.

In 2006, UPN merged with The WB to form The CW and chose as its Lima affiliate WB 100+ station "WBOH", operated by then-rival NBC affiliate WLIO. At the same time, Fox, the network with which WOHL-CA, WLQP-LP's sister station, was affiliated, was forming MyNetworkTV for UPN and WB affiliates that were not chosen. Metro Video Productions, both stations' owners, opted to pursue the MyNetworkTV affiliation on behalf of WOHL-CA and signed an affiliation deal for WLQP-LP with ABC. The deal took effect on September 1, restoring ABC to the Lima area for the first time since WLIO dropped its secondary ABC affiliation in 1982; thereafter, the network's affiliates in Columbus (WSYX), Dayton (first WDTN, then WKEF after August 2004), Fort Wayne (WPTA), and Toledo (first WNWO-TV, then WTVG after October 1995) served as the network's default affiliates for the market. At one point, WLQP-LP carried America One on secondary basis that was shared with WLMO. In 2006, WLQP-LP applied to the Federal Communications Commission (FCC) to perform a "flash-cut" of its signal to digital. However, in mid-2009, the station decided instead to apply for a displacement low-power digital station on UHF channel 45 with the calls WLQP-LD. On June 8, 2010, the FCC granted WLQP-LP a construction permit for their new digital signal.

On November 29, 2008, it was announced that Metro Video Productions would sell its stations to West Central Ohio Broadcasting, a subsidiary of Block Communications (owner of WLIO). While Block assumed control of the station's operations after the sale's completion, it was initially stated that the company would not consolidate WLQP-LP's facilities on South Central Avenue with WLIO. It has since been stated that some consolidation would take place with this station moving to WLIO's studios on Rice Avenue.

On September 28, 2009, WLQP-LP terminated its analog operations and programming was shifted to WOHL-CD. Fox and MyNetworkTV programming which had been seen on that channel continues to be aired on WLIO-DT2 as well as Charter Spectrum channel 9 and in high definition on digital channel 709. To avoid automatic license termination, on June 10, 2010, the FCC granted WLQP-LP special temporary authority to restore analog service on WOHL's former analog allotment on channel 25 because of interference with NBC affiliate WISE-TV in Fort Wayne, Indiana which is currently operating its digital signal on channel 18. WLQP's analog signal was restored on September 13. WLQP-LP's previous logo looks similar to KDRV in Medford, Oregon, which is also an ABC affiliate. However, neither station is related to the other.

On November 7, 2018, WLQP-LP's call sign was changed to WPNM-LP. By 2019, Block Communications had filed with the FCC to convert WPNM-LP into a digital translator of WOHL-CD for the northern part of the market, licensed to Leipsic, Ohio, offering ABC and CBS programming over digital channels 27.5 and 27.6, virtually mapped to channels 35.1 and 35.2, respectively, in likely anticipation of the new July 13, 2021, low-power analog television shutdown date announced by the FCC on May 17, 2017. By December 2019, Block Communications commenced digital operations of this low-power television station. WPNM-LP was obligated to convert to digital by July 13, 2021, as part of the digital TV transition for low-power TV stations. On January 31, 2020, the translator's call sign was changed to WPNM-LD.

On August 1, 2025, Gray Media announced it would acquire all of Block's broadcast television stations, including WPNM-LD, WOHL-CD, WAMS-LD and WLIO, for $80 million. The sale was approved by the FCC on May 6, 2026, and completed the same day.

== Subchannels ==
This station rebroadcasts the subchannels of WOHL-CD.

Subchannels of WOHL-CD, WPNM-LD, and WAMS-LD
| Channel | Res. | Short name | Programming |
|---|---|---|---|
| 35.1 | 720p | WOHLABC | ABC |
| 35.2 | 720p | WOHLCBS | CBS |
