= WAMS-LD =

Television station in Minister–New Bremen, Ohio

Translator of WOHL-CD, Lima, Ohio
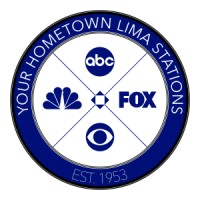
- Minster–New Bremen, Ohio (Note: Originally licensed to Lima, Ohio; moved to Minster–New Bremen in 2020.); United States
- Channels: Digital: 29 (UHF); Virtual: 35
- Branding: see WOHL-CD

Programming
- Affiliations: 35.1: ABC; 35.2: CBS

Ownership
- Owner: Gray Media; (Gray Television Licensee, LLC)
- Sister stations: WPNM-LD, WOHL-CD, WLIO

History
- Founded: September 22, 1998
- Former call signs: W65DP (1998–2002); WLMO-LP (2002–2018); WAMS-LP (2018–2020)
- Former channel number: Analog: 65 (UHF, 1998–2002), 38 (UHF, 2002–2009 and 2010−2020)
- Former affiliations: Fox (via WOHL, 1998–2002); America One (secondary)

Technical information
- Licensing authority: FCC
- Facility ID: 70612
- ERP: 15 kW
- HAAT: 83.2 m (273 ft)
- Transmitter coordinates: 40°23′19.2″N 84°21′26.4″W

Links
- Public license information: LMS
- Website: www.hometownstations.com

WAMS-LD (channel 35) is a low-power television station licensed to both Minster and New Bremen, Ohio, United States. It is a translator of Lima-based Class A dual ABC/CBS affiliate WOHL-CD (channel 35) which is owned by Gray Media, and is also sister to full-power dual NBC/Fox affiliate WLIO (channel 8). WAMS-LD's transmitter is located off SR 119 east of Minster; its parent station shares studios with WLIO on Rice Avenue northwest of downtown Lima.

== History ==
The station's previous logo.

The station signed on September 22, 1998, with the calls W65DP. It aired an analog signal on UHF channel 65 and was a full-time translator of WOHL-LP (now WOHL-CD). The channel was spun off in 2002 and became a CBS affiliate with the calls WLMO-LP while moving to UHF channel 38. This aired from a transmitter west of Cridersville in Auglaize County. Before the station affiliated with CBS, Dayton affiliate WHIO-TV served as the CBS affiliate of record for the Lima market, while Columbus affiliate WBNS-TV and Toledo affiliate WTOL served the eastern and northern portions of the market; some areas of the western portion of the market were also served by Fort Wayne affiliate WANE-TV. After picking up CBS, WLMO fought an uphill battle with Time Warner Cable (now Charter Spectrum). The company initially refused to carry the station on its Lima system due to the presence of both WHIO-TV and WBNS-TV, the latter of which would replace WTOL-TV on most cable providers in the area.

With WLMO being a low-power station with no support from any full-power channels, Time Warner was not obligated to carry the station. Must-carry regulations do not apply to low-power stations regardless of affiliation. However, on March 29, 2006, Time Warner added the station to its systems in Lima, Cridersville, and Wapakoneta. At one point, this station carried America One on a secondary basis that was shared with WLQP-LP.

WLMO had applied to the Federal Communications Commission (FCC) to perform a "flash-cut" of its signal to digital in 2006. This application was dismissed as of July 1, 2009, because the station decided instead to apply for a low-power digital companion channel on UHF channel 47 with the calls WLMO-LD. On September 28, 2009, WLMO terminated its analog operations and programming was shifted to WOHL-CD's second digital subchannel.

On November 29, 2008, it was announced that Metro Video Productions would sell its stations (including WLMO) to West Central Ohio Broadcasting, a subsidiary of Block Communications (owner of WLIO). While Block assumed control of the station's operations after the sale's completion, it was initially stated that the company would not consolidate WLMO's facilities on South Central Avenue with WLIO. It has since been stated that some consolidation would take place with the station moving to WLIO's studios on Rice Avenue. On June 8, 2010, WLMO-LD was granted a construction permit. On June 10, to avoid automatic license termination, the FCC granted WLMO special temporary authority to restore analog service on channel 38. WLMO-LP's analog signal was restored on September 13.

On November 15, 2018, WLMO-LP's call sign was changed to WAMS-LP. By 2019, Block Communications had filed with the FCC to convert WAMS-LP into a digital translator of WOHL-CD for the southern part of the market, licensed to both Minster and New Bremen, Ohio, offering ABC and CBS programming over digital channels 29.5 and 29.6, virtually mapped to channels 35.1 and 35.2, respectively, in likely anticipation of the new July 13, 2021, low-power analog television shutdown date announced by the FCC on May 17, 2017. By March 2020, Block Communications commenced digital operations of this low-power television station. WAMS-LP was obligated to convert to digital by July 13, 2021, as part of the digital TV transition for low-power TV stations. On March 2, 2020, the translator's call sign was changed to WAMS-LD.

On August 1, 2025, Gray Media announced it would acquire all of Block's broadcast television stations, including WAMS-LD, WOHL-CD, WPNM-LD and WLIO, for $80 million. The sale was approved by the FCC on May 6, 2026, and completed the same day.

== Subchannels ==
This station rebroadcasts the subchannels of WOHL-CD.

Subchannels of WOHL-CD, WPNM-LD, and WAMS-LD
Channel	Res.	Short name	Programming
35.1	720p	WOHLABC	ABC
35.2	720p	WOHLCBS	CBS
