= WEGE =

- Lima, Ohio; United States
- Broadcast area: Allen County
- Frequency: 104.9 MHz
- Branding: 104.9 The Eagle

Programming
- Format: Classic rock
- Affiliations: United Stations Radio Networks; Westwood One

Ownership
- Owner: Woof Boom Radio; (Woof Boom Radio of Lima LLC)
- Sister stations: WCIT, WDOH, WFGF, WWSR

History
- First air date: November 25, 1970
- Former call signs: WLSR (1970–1997); WLJM (1997); WAJC (1997–1998, 1998–1999); WUZZ-FM (1998, 1999–2007)
- Call sign meaning: Eagle

Technical information
- Licensing authority: FCC
- Facility ID: 1061
- Class: A
- ERP: 3,000 watts
- HAAT: 67 meters (220 ft)
- Transmitter coordinates: 40°43′21.00″N 84°5′4.00″W

Links
- Public license information: Public file; LMS
- Webcast: Listen live
- Website: 1049theeagle.com

WEGE (104.9 FM, "104.9 The Eagle") is a commercial classic rock radio station licensed to Lima, Ohio. Owned by Woof Boom Radio, the station serves Allen County and is the local affiliate for Nights with Alice Cooper. Both the WEGE studios and transmitter are located in Lima.

== History ==
WEGE was founded in 1970 as WLSR (for "Lima Stereo Radio") airing a beautiful music format, which later moved to adult contemporary in 1986, after being purchased by Allen Broadcasting Company. Using the slogan Lite 105, the station featured live, local disc jockeys and newscasters in drive time, and the Transtar "Format 41" satellite service at all other times. In 1989, the station modified its nickname to Lite Rock 105, forgoing the satellite service in favor of all live, local disc jockeys.

In 1991, WLSR changed its nickname again, this time to "Mix 104.9," while continuing the adult contemporary format. In 1995, WLSR and its sister AM station, WCIT, became among the first stations in the United States to operate using computers to store and play all music and commercials. The system, built by Scott Studios, allowed the stations to operate in live or fully automated modes, with disc jockeys broadcasting live, or pre-recording their voice tracks into the system. In 1996, WLSR changed to an Urban format, changing its nickname to "105 Jamz" and its call letters to WLJM (standing for "Lima's Jamz"). In 1997, Allen Broadcasting Company sold both stations to Forever Broadcasting, which moved the Urban/R&B-format and call letters to the AM station, renamed "940 JAMZ" WLJM. The FM station was briefly known as adult contemporary WAJC from July 1997 to November 1999,

From 1999–2005 the station aired classic hits under the callsign WUZZ-FM. The station was mostly automated using voices from the other stations in the building at the time (WZOQ, etc.) in recorded voice breaks. The morning and afternoon drive time slots were the only ones "live".

== Current programming ==
On April 19, 2007, the FCC approved a call sign change from WUZZ-FM to WEGE. WEGE had been the call sign of a station in Westerville, Ohio, owned by North American Broadcasting in the Columbus market, prior to changing its call sign to WTDA in 2004. WEGE airs Nights with Alice Cooper weeknights via United Stations Radio Networks.

Effective July 1, 2013, WEGE and its sister stations were purchased by Childers Media Group, a locally owned company, from Maverick Media at a price of $2.1 million; its offices and studios were moved from its former location on Cable Road to 57 Town Square in downtown Lima.

Effective February 15, 2018, Childers Media Group sold WEGE and four sister stations to Woof Boom Radio of Lima LLC for $2.425 million.
