= WPBM-CD =

Television station in Scottsville, Kentucky

- Scottsville–Glasgow, Kentucky; United States
- City: Scottsville, Kentucky
- Channels: Digital: 15 (UHF); Virtual: 31

Programming
- Affiliations: 31.1: Religious Independent

Ownership
- Owner: Marvey B. & Frances Wood; (Proclaim Broadcasting, Inc.)

History
- Founded: 1982
- First air date: July 1, 1982 (first incarnation; in Cookeville, Tennessee); May 1, 1998 (second incarnation)
- Last air date: 1992 (first incarnation)
- Former call signs: W07BM (1982–1992); W48BM (1992–2001); WPBM-LP (2001–2010)
- Former channel numbers: Analog: 7 (VHF, 1982–1992), 48 (UHF, 1998–2001), 31 (UHF, 2001–2009); Digital: 46 (UHF, 2009–2019)
- Former affiliations: Religious independent (1982–1992); Dark (1992–1998); FamilyNet (1998–2013)
- Call sign meaning: "Where Promises Become Miracles"

Technical information
- Licensing authority: FCC
- Facility ID: 30580
- Class: CD
- ERP: 8 kW
- HAAT: 150.7 m (494 ft)
- Transmitter coordinates: 36°50′0″N 86°5′0″W

Links
- Public license information: Public file; LMS

WPBM-CD (channel 31) is a low-power, Class A religious independent television station in Scottsville, Kentucky, United States. The station is owned by Scottsville businessman and minister Marvey B. Wood and his late wife, Frances. They are the sole owners of the station, doing business as Proclaim Broadcasting, Inc.

WPBM-CD's studio and transmitter site are located along U.S. Route 31E near Barren River Lake in rural northeastern Allen County, not too far from the county's northeastern boundary with Barren County.

== History ==
=== The Cookeville years ===
Originally licensed to and serving Cookeville, Tennessee, the station began its first incarnation on July 1, 1982 under the callsign W07BM, broadcasting on VHF channel 7. It was originally a religious independent station owned by the First Baptist Church of Cookeville. Transmission of the station originated from a tower on South Walnut Street in downtown Cookeville. Programming aired on W07BM originally consisted of televised church services, classified advertising, city council meetings, and some syndicated programming.

=== Relocation to southern Kentucky ===
Sometime around 1991, the owners of the station filed to sell the station and to relocate the station to the Bowling Green–Glasgow, Kentucky area. Once the relocation was complete, the station changed the callsign to W48BM on January 10, 1992. Construction of the new facility near Scottsville began in 1994.

=== Second incarnation ===
The station was sold to upstart and locally based Proclaim Broadcasting in early 1998. The station, branded as TV-48, returned to the air for its second incarnation on May 1, 1998, broadcasting on UHF channel 48 from its current transmitter site. Three years later, its analog signal was reallocated to UHF channel 31 in 2001, and changed its callsign to WPBM-LP, as part of the beginning of the digital television conversion. Since then, the station was branded as TV-31, Proclaim Broadcasting. WPBM discontinued its analog signal and converted to digital broadcasting in December 2009 on channel 46, but it is displayed as virtual channel 31.1. The current WPBM-CD call letters were adopted on June 25, 2010. In October 2019, WPBM began broadcasting on channel 15, as required by the FCC as part of the Spectrum auction.

The station was an over-the-air affiliate of FamilyNet from 1998 until 2013.

Currently, in terms of religious television outlets, WPBM is the only locally based religious television station for the Bowling Green media market of any part, even though Allen County, Kentucky, where the station is based in, is considered to be part of the Nashville, Tennessee media market. That is due in part of Allen County's close proximity to the Kentucky–Tennessee state line. WPBM serves at least nearby portions of both the Nashville and Bowling Green media markets on both sides of the state line. Hendersonville, Tennessee–based WPGD-TV, an owned-and-operated station of the Trinity Broadcasting Network, also serves parts of southern Kentucky as the default over-the-air TBN affiliate for the area, but is a second option for religious programming. Bowling Green would not be served over-the-air by another locally based religious station besides WPBM until the Sonlife Broadcasting Network became available via the fourth digital subchannel of then-upstart WCZU-LD in August 2016.

== Local programming ==
As a Christian television station, WPBM produces more than 12 hours per week of local programming, including music, interviews, preaching, teaching and family living shows. Local programming produced by the station includes From the Heart with Frances Wood, Sneed Family Music starring The Sneed Family of Glasgow, Take The Living Word to a Dying World with station owner Marvey B. Wood, and a few other locally produced programs are featured. WPBM airs Sunday worship services on a delayed basis from Shepherd's House in Glasgow, Bethlehem Baptist Church in Greensburg, Abounding Grace Ministries in Scottsville and First Baptist Church, Bowling Green.

== Subchannel ==
Subchannel of WPBM-CD
Subchannel	Res.	Short name	Programming
31.1	1080i	WPBM-CD	Religious Independent

== Coverage area ==
With 8,000 watts of power and a 500-foot (152 m) tower, the signal covers about a 40-mile (64 km) radius from the tower site. WPBM is carried by 15 cable television systems, taking the signal far beyond the 40-mile (60 km) broadcast radius. Some of the communities where WPBM is available on cable include Glasgow, Scottsville, Morgantown, Brownsville, Hodgenville, Albany, Cave City, Park City, Munfordville, Franklin, Horse Cave, Greensburg, and Edmonton. In Tennessee, WPBM is carried on cable in Lafayette, Westmoreland and Red Boiling Springs. The station is not carried on cable in Bowling Green, only over the air with an antenna. Providers that distribute WPBM to these areas include Comcast, Mediacom, South Central Rural Telephone Cooperative, the Glasgow Electric Plant Board, and North Central Telephone Cooperative.
