= KBTU-LD =

Television station in Salt Lake City

- Salt Lake City, Utah; United States
- Channels: Digital: 15 (UHF); Virtual: 23

Programming
- Affiliations: see § Subchannels

Ownership
- Owner: Innovate Corp.; (HC2 Broadcasting, Inc.)

History
- First air date: 2003
- Former call signs: K23GP (2003–2006); KBTU-LP (2006–2015)
- Former channel numbers: Analog: 23 (UHF, 2003–2015); Digital: 23 (UHF, 2015–2021)
- Former affiliations: Spanish Independent (2003–2012); MundoFox/MundoMax (2012–2016); Altavisión (2017–2018); Azteca América (2018–2022); Visión Latina (2022–2025); Infomercials (2025); Black Vision TV (2025–2026)
- Call sign meaning: "Bustos Media TV Utah" (former owner)

Technical information
- Licensing authority: FCC
- Facility ID: 125589
- Class: LD
- ERP: 5 kW
- HAAT: 1,116.5 m (3,663 ft)
- Transmitter coordinates: 40°40′55.7″N 112°12′11.5″W

Links
- Public license information: LMS

KBTU-LD (channel 23) is a low-power television station in Salt Lake City, Utah, United States, owned by Innovate Corp. The station's transmitter is located atop Kesler Peak. KBTU-LD is available over the air and on local cable but not on any of the satellite services.

== History ==
The original construction permit was applied by Airwaves Broadcasting LLC in Park City, Utah, in 2002.

Bustos Media used to own the station; until March 2009, when it slashed nearly all of its longform local programming in response to the Great Recession, it had several local programs, including a morning show, Despertando Utah (Waking Up Utah), that had been on the air since 2006, as well as daily local newscasts that were canceled when the main anchor went on maternity leave.

In September 2010, Bustos transferred most of its licenses to Adelante Media Group as part of a settlement with its lenders. The change from Bustos to Adelante resulted in the launch of Mega TV on the channel, which had been airing music videos, as well as plans to relaunch local news.

Adelante sold KBTU-LP, along with WBWT-LP in Milwaukee, Wisconsin, to DTV America Corporation for $425,000 on July 16, 2015.

On December 31, 2022, Azteca América ceased operations.

== Subchannels ==
The station's signal is multiplexed:

Subchannels of KBTU-LD
Subchannel	Res.	Short name	Programming
23.1	480i	KBTU-LD	Hasbro Legends
23.2	480i	KBTU-LD	SonLife (4:3)
23.3	480i	KBTU-LD	NTD America
23.4	480i	KBTU-LD	QVC 365
23.5	480i	KBTU-LD	365BLK
23.6	480i	KBTU-LD	Shop LC (4:3)
23.7	480i	KBTU-LD	Confess

KBTU-LD first applied for a construction permit on RF channel 23 in August 2000, which was amended several times, and granted in 2004. The station moved to RF channel 15 in 2021.
