= Buckland, Ohio =

- Village
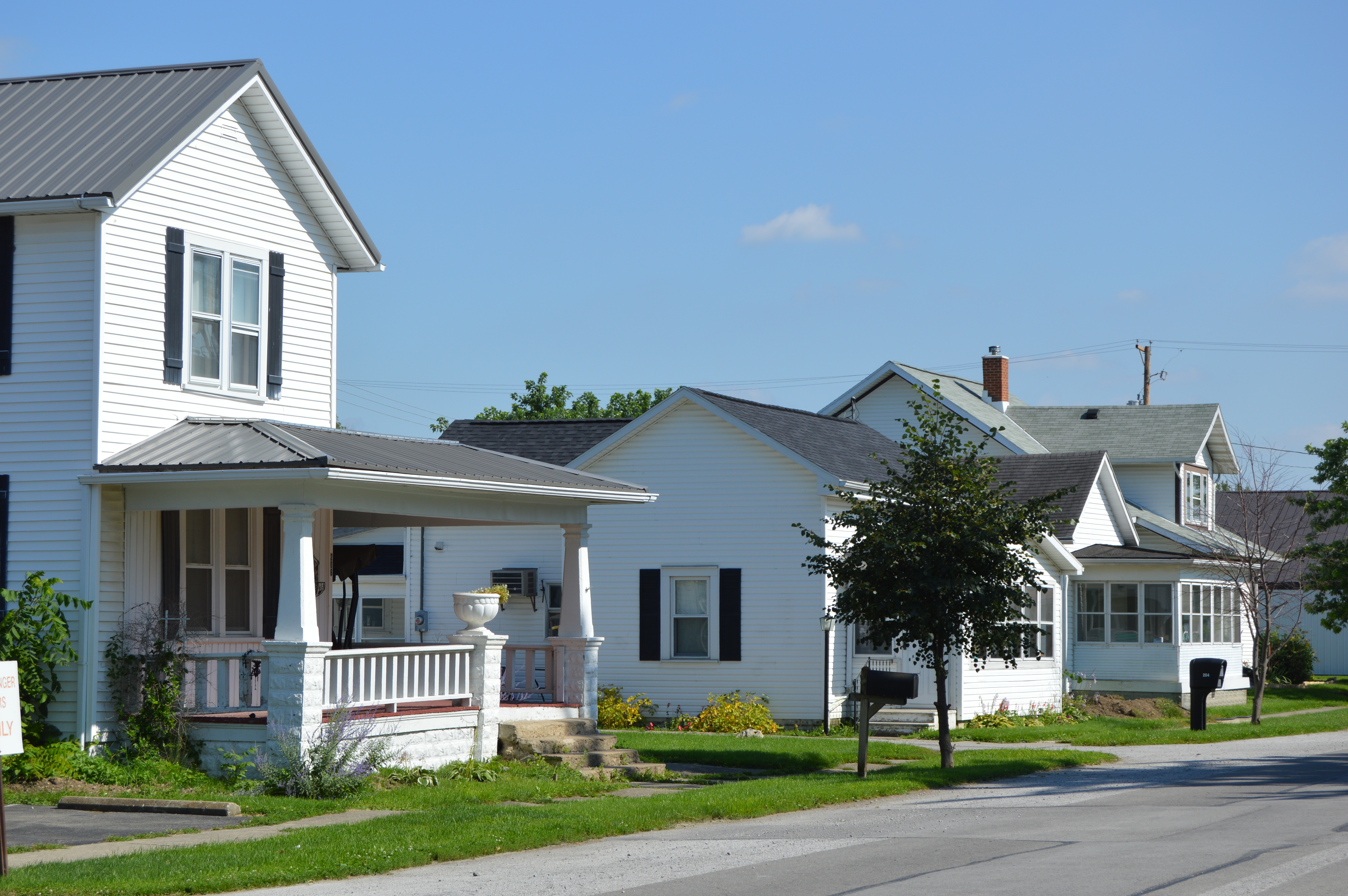
- Houses on Main Street

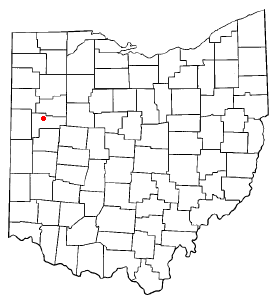
- Location of Buckland, Ohio

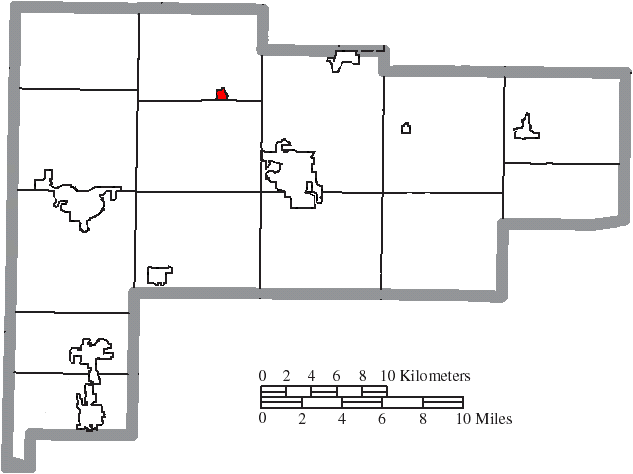
- Location of Buckland in Auglaize County
- Coordinates: 40°37′28″N 84°15′37″W
- Country: United States
- State: Ohio
- County: Auglaize
- Township: Logan, Moulton
- Founded: 1872

Area
  - Total: 0.30 sq mi (0.78 km^{2})
  - Land: 0.30 sq mi (0.78 km^{2})
  - Water: 0 sq mi (0.00 km^{2})
- Elevation: 853 ft (260 m)

Population (2020)
  - Total: 233
  - Estimate (2023): 229
  - Density: 776.1/sq mi (299.65/km^{2})
- Time zone: UTC-5 (Eastern (EST))
  - Summer (DST): UTC-4 (EDT)
- ZIP code: 45819
- Area code: 419
- FIPS code: 39-09974
- GNIS feature ID: 2397484

Buckland is a village in Auglaize County, Ohio, United States. The population was 233 at the 2020 census. It is included in the Wapakoneta, Ohio Micropolitan Statistical Area. The village is served by the Wapakoneta City School District.

== History ==
Founded in 1872, Buckland was originally named Whitefeather. The present name, adopted in 1891, is for a man named Buckland who was credited with bringing the railroad to the site.

== Geography ==
According to the United States Census Bureau, the village has a total area of 0.26 square miles (0.67 km^{2}), all land.

== Demographics ==
Historical population
Census	Pop.	Note	%±
1900	349		—
1910	364		4.3%
1920	258		−29.1%
1930	242		−6.2%
1940	287		18.6%
1950	274		−4.5%
1960	300		9.5%
1970	281		−6.3%
1980	271		−3.6%
1990	239		−11.8%
2000	255		6.7%
2010	233		−8.6%
2020	233		0.0%
2023 (est.)	229	▼	−1.7%
U.S. Decennial Census

=== 2010 census ===
As of the census of 2010, there were 233 people, 96 households, and 64 families residing in the village. The population density was 896.2 inhabitants per square mile (346.0/km^{2}). There were 102 housing units at an average density of 392.3 per square mile (151.5/km^{2}). The racial makeup of the village was 98.7% White, 0.4% Asian, and 0.9% from two or more races. Hispanic or Latino of any race were 2.1% of the population.

There were 96 households, of which 35.4% had children under the age of 18 living with them, 46.9% were married couples living together, 11.5% had a female householder with no husband present, 8.3% had a male householder with no wife present, and 33.3% were non-families. 27.1% of all households were made up of individuals, and 14.6% had someone living alone who was 65 years of age or older. The average household size was 2.43 and the average family size was 2.95.

The median age in the village was 36.3 years. 28.3% of residents were under the age of 18; 5.5% were between the ages of 18 and 24; 30.8% were from 25 to 44; 21.1% were from 45 to 64; and 14.2% were 65 years of age or older. The gender makeup of the village was 50.6% male and 49.4% female.

=== 2000 census ===
As of the census of 2000, there were 255 people, 104 households, and 74 families residing in the village. The population density was 995.4 inhabitants per square mile (384.3/km^{2}). There were 104 housing units at an average density of 406.0 per square mile (156.8/km^{2}). The racial makeup of the village was 98.43% White, 0.39% Native American, and 1.18% from two or more races.

There were 104 households, out of which 38.5% had children under the age of 18 living with them, 54.8% were married couples living together, 12.5% had a female householder with no husband present, and 27.9% were non-families. 24.0% of all households were made up of individuals, and 9.6% had someone living alone who was 65 years of age or older. The average household size was 2.45 and the average family size was 2.88.

In the village, the population was spread out, with 27.8% under the age of 18, 11.4% from 18 to 24, 28.6% from 25 to 44, 14.1% from 45 to 64, and 18.0% who were 65 years of age or older. The median age was 33 years. For every 100 females there were 99.2 males. For every 100 females age 18 and over, there were 91.7 males.

The median income for a household in the village was $31,172, and the median income for a family was $31,625. Males had a median income of $31,042 versus $20,500 for females. The per capita income for the village was $15,491. About 1.3% of families and 4.9% of the population were below the poverty line, including 7.4% of those under the age of eighteen and none of those 65 or over.
