= KYUM-LD =

Television station in Yuma, Arizona

- Yuma, Arizona; United States
- Channels: Digital: 15 (UHF), to move to 23 (UHF); Virtual: 15

Programming
- Affiliations: 15.1: Tele Vida Abundante; 15.2: Radio Vida Abundante

Ownership
- Owner: Centro Cristiano Vida Abundante, Inc.

History
- Founded: February 15, 1997
- Former call signs: K16EI (CP only); KYUM-LP (1997–2015)
- Former affiliations: TBN
- Call sign meaning: K Yuma

Technical information
- Licensing authority: FCC
- Facility ID: 74378
- Class: LD
- ERP: 1.8 kW; 15 kW (CP)
- HAAT: 381.3 m (1,251 ft); 40.9 m (134 ft) (CP)
- Transmitter coordinates: 32°40′21″N 114°20′10″W; 32°41′13.6″N 114°35′26.3″W (CP)

Links
- Public license information: LMS

KYUM-LD (channel 15) is a low-power television station in Yuma, Arizona, United States, owned by Centro Cristiano Vida Abundante, Inc. of Santa Maria, California. It is the flagship station of the Spanish-language religious network Tele Vida Abundante and broadcasts from a transmitter located near the Yuma Airport.

== History ==
The Federal Communications Commission (FCC) issued a construction permit on February 15, 1997, to Yoneide S. Dinzey to build low-power station K16EI, to serve Yuma on UHF channel 16. Dinzey sold the permit to the Three Angels Broadcasting Network (3ABN) in February 1999, and 3ABN then sold it to Tiger Eye Broadcasting six weeks later, in April 1999. Tiger Eye Broadcasting changed the station's call letters to KYUM-LP in February 2000, and licensed the station on April 5, 2001, before selling it to Powell Meredith Communications Company a month later. The station was listed as an affiliate of the Trinity Broadcasting Network at that time.

With station KSWT being assigned channel 16 for their digital television operations, KYUM-LP was forced to move, and filed an application with the FCC in May 2001 to move to VHF channel 2. The application was granted in March 2002, but the station was forced to go silent when KSWT-DT began broadcasting, likely in March or April 2002 after they were granted Special Temporary Authority. Powell Meredith licensed the station on channel 2 in May 2005, but KYUM-LP aired no programming, as the owners were in the process of finding a buyer. They agreed to sell the station to Hispanic Christian Communication Network (HCCN) in June 2005, but the sale was not consummated until May 2006. Shortly afterward, the station began broadcasting Christian Spanish-language programming from Tele Vida Abundante. The same month, HCCN agreed to sell the station to Centro Christiano Vida Abundante, producers of the programming, and in late November 2006, the FCC approved the sale.

In August 2006, KYUM-LP was identified as a singleton applicant for a companion digital LPTV station on UHF channel 23. A singleton applicant is one whose application for a construction permit has no competition from nearby applications on the same or adjacent channels. The station applied for a construction permit on October 27, but since it was close to Mexico, it required international coordination. The Mexican government objected to the station, and on November 7, 2007, KYUM was notified that its application would be dismissed.

== Subchannels ==
The station's signal is multiplexed:

Subchannels of KYUM-LD
Channel	Res.	Short name	Programming
15.1	480i	TVA	Tele Vida Abundante (4:3)
15.2	480i	Radio	Radio Vida Abundante (4:3)
