= WIMT =

- Lima, Ohio; United States
- Frequency: 102.1 MHz
- Branding: T102.1

Programming
- Format: Country music

Ownership
- Owner: iHeartMedia, Inc.; (iHM Licenses, LLC)
- Sister stations: {{WIMA|WMLXWZRX-FM|WBKS}}

History
- First air date: 1954; 72 years ago
- Former call signs: WIMA-FM (1954–1981); WIQA (1981–1982)

Technical information
- Licensing authority: FCC
- Facility ID: 37497
- Class: B
- ERP: 11,000 watts
- HAAT: 323 meters (1,060 ft)
- Transmitter coordinates: 40°38′3.2″N 84°12′28.8″W

Links
- Public license information: Public file; LMS
- Webcast: Listen live (via iHeartRadio)
- Website: t102.iheart.com

WIMT (102.1 FM, "American Country T102") is a commercial FM radio station licensed to Lima, Ohio, operating at 102.1 MHz with a country music format. Its studios and offices are located on West Market Street in Lima, with its transmitter located just outside Buckland, between Wapakoneta and Lima.
