= WLCU-CD =

Television station in Campbellsville, Kentucky

- Campbellsville, Kentucky; United States
- Channels: Digital: 15 (UHF); Virtual: 4

Programming
- Affiliations: 4.1: Educational Independent

Ownership
- Owner: Campbellsville University
- Sister stations: WLCU (FM)

History
- Founded: May 30, 1984
- First air date: June 6, 1986
- Former call signs: W04BP (1984–2007); WLCU-CA (2007–2015)
- Former channel numbers: Analog: 4 (VHF, 1986–2015); Digital: 23 (UHF, 2015–2019)
- Former affiliations: Religious Independent (1990s–2018); Tempo Television (secondary, 1986–19??) CMT (secondary, 1986–19??); FamilyNet (secondary, 1987?–2017)
- Call sign meaning: Campbellsville University

Technical information
- Licensing authority: FCC
- Facility ID: 8500
- Class: CD
- ERP: 2.48 kW
- HAAT: 45.6 m (150 ft)
- Transmitter coordinates: 37°20′39″N 85°21′34″W

Links
- Public license information: Public file; LMS
- Website: Official website

WLCU-CD (channel 4) is a low-power, Class A television station in Campbellsville, Kentucky, United States. It is owned by Campbellsville University alongside college/Christian radio station WLCU (88.7 FM). WLCU-CD's transmitter is located on Laura Sue Humphress Drive on Campbellsville's west side.

WLCU-CD airs educational programming and religious services as well as local sports, music, and public affairs shows. On cable, the station is carried on Comcast Xfinity channel 10 in the Campbellsville area.

== History ==
The station's construction permit was granted by the Federal Communications Commission (FCC) on May 30, 1984, under the callsign W04BP. More than two years later, the station was officially licensed on June 6, 1986, and it then signed on shortly after. It was originally under ownership of Heartland Communications, Inc., and initially aired a mixture of programming from CMT and Tempo Television, and also periodically aired college football and basketball games involving the University of Louisville Cardinals athletic programs. Unlike Campbellsville's other television outlet at the time, WGRB-TV (later WBKI-TV, channel 34, now defunct), the station also opened a news department that aired at least two newscasts every day. W04BP used its radio sister stations to promote the television outlet.

Sometime between 1987 and 1990, Tempo and CMT were dropped by the station in favor of becoming a FamilyNet affiliate on a secondary basis, but becoming a religious independent station on a primary basis. In 1990, W04BP was sold to the mass media department of Campbellsville University. In 2007, the station's callsign was changed to WLCU-CA.

In 2015, WLCU filed an application to switch to digital as it was required for low-power analog stations to convert to digital by the original deadline of September 2015, which was pushed back to spring 2021. The station was licensed for digital operation on May 28, 2015, moving from analog VHF channel 4 to digital UHF channel 23. Upon the conversion, the station's callsign was changed to the current WLCU-CD. Just before FamilyNet ceased operations prior to their rebranding as the Cowboy Channel, WLCU then became an educational independent station in 2018.

On October 18, 2019, the station moved its digital signal to UHF channel 15 as part of its participation in the 2016–17 FCC broadcast spectrum incentive auction.

== Coverage area and market status ==
WLCU's signal can be received in most of Taylor and Green counties, along with good portions of Adair, Marion, and southern Nelson counties, all of which are located within the southeastern fringes of the Louisville television market.
