= Charles Wintzer Building =

- U.S. National Register of Historic Places
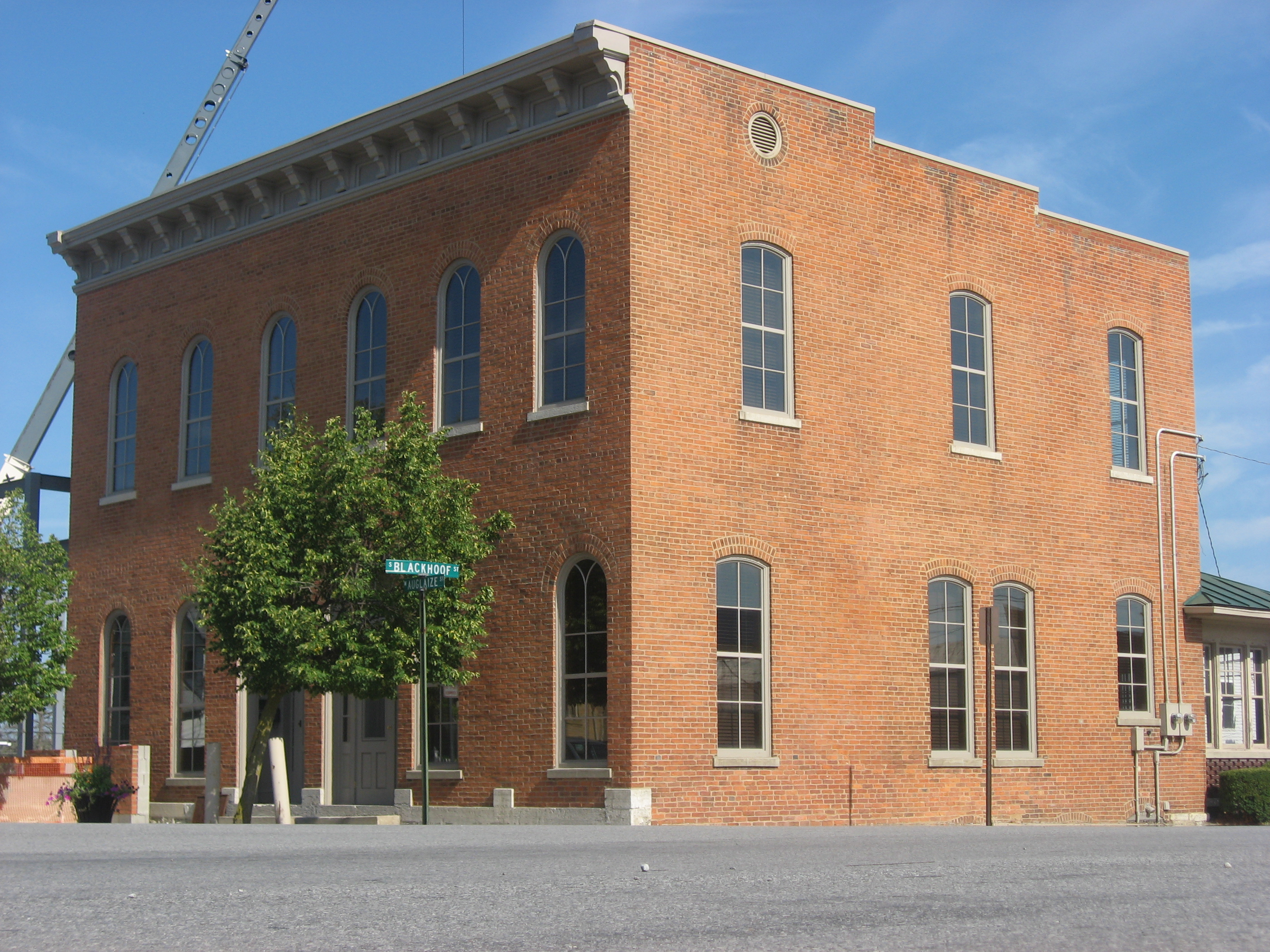
- Front and side of the building

- Location within Ohio Location within the United States
- Location: 202 W. Auglaize St., Wapakoneta, Ohio
- Coordinates: 40°34′15″N 84°11′47″W
- Built: 1872
- Architectural style: Italianate
- NRHP reference No.: 10000455
- Added to NRHP: July 8, 2010

The Charles Wintzer Building is a historic brick commercial building in downtown Wapakoneta, Ohio, United States. Built in 1872 at the intersection of Auglaize and Blackhoof Streets, it has always been primarily an industrial building. It was declared a historic site in 2010.

== Wintzer corporation ==
One of the area's first pioneers, Charles Wintzer, founded a tannery in 1848. Concentrating on the manufacture of leather products, the Charles Wintzer Tanning Company expanded through the purchase of a similar local company in 1862, and it was incorporated in 1898. By 1905, its annual output was 2,500 sides of leather; however, in that year, the company made a fundamental change in its business model. Instead of operating as a tannery, the firm moved to retailing hides to other tanneries and buying and selling various byproducts of animal processing. Nevertheless, it remained in the Wintzer family; it was re-incorporated as G.A. Wintzer & Son in 1920. As the company expanded into other animal products during and after the 1920s, it built factories outside of Wapakoneta, but it continued to use the old tannery at Auglaize and Blackhoof for manufacturing and as its corporate headquarters.

== Architecture ==
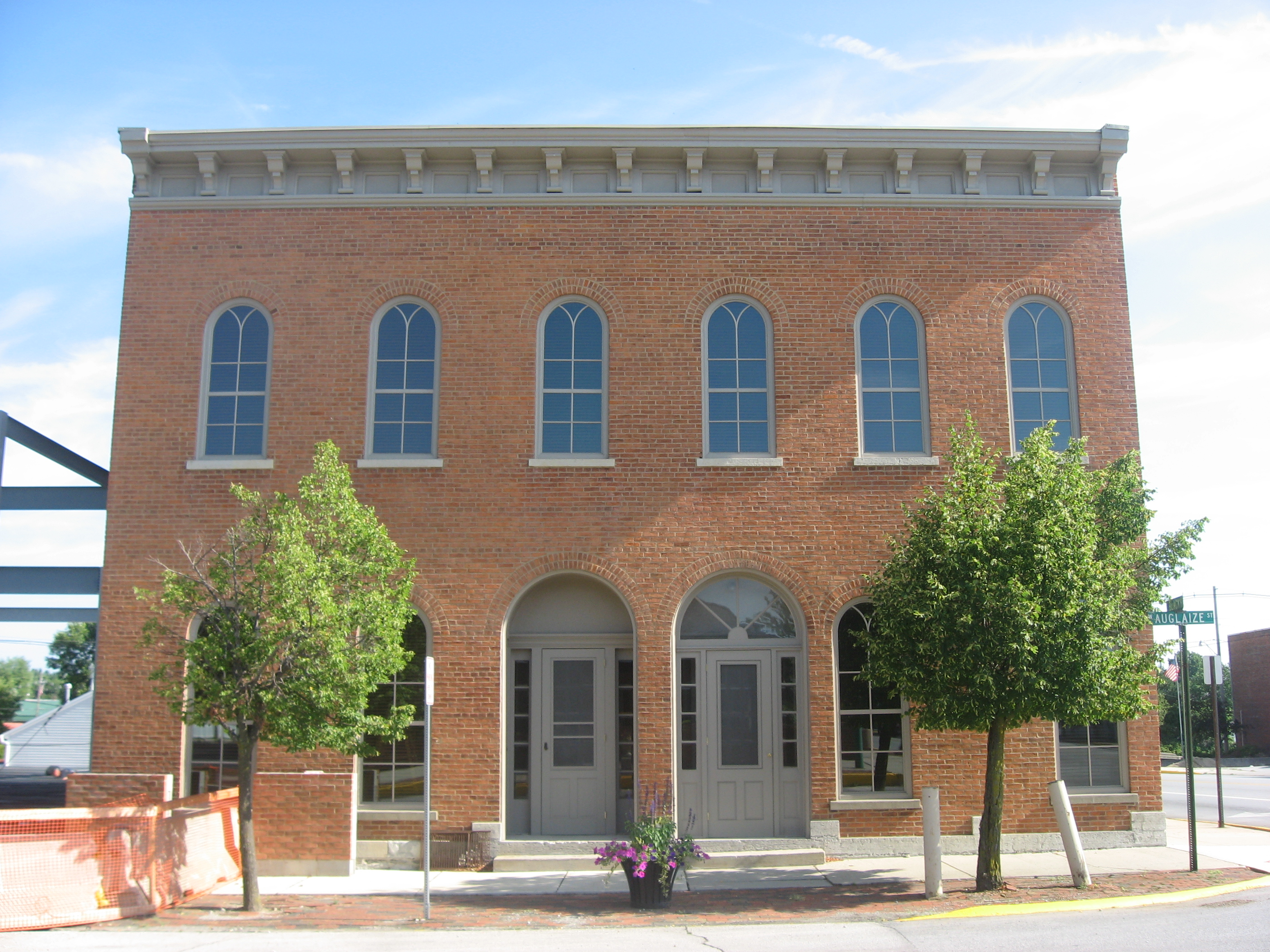
Front of the building

Built in 1872, the Wintzer Building was originally the company's primary tannery. As well as serving as an industrial facility, it was also built as a home; the Wintzers operated their business on the first story and lived on the second story. Its architecture is that of warehouses along the Miami and Erie Canal; although the Wintzers were Germans and built their home-and-office building in a German style, it includes distinct Italianate elements. Although the building had been converted into factory and corporate office space by the late 1970s, this was a relatively recent transition; the second floor remained a residence until at least 1969.

== Recognition ==
On July 8, 2010, the Charles Wintzer Building was listed on the National Register of Historic Places, primarily because of its well-preserved historic architecture. In nominating the building for inclusion on the Register, the Ohio Historical Society concentrated on its place as an example of late nineteenth-century German architecture and on its combination of residential and industrial space under the same roof. Also important to this designation was its connection with G.A. Wintzer & Son, which still owns the building; as the oldest locally owned business operating in Auglaize County, the Wintzer Company is significant in local history. As the building has been constantly used as a factory by six generations of Wintzers, it is of significant importance in the history of Wapakoneta and the surrounding area.

== Notes ==
a: A "side" is half of an animal hide; i.e., the tannery processed approximately 1,250 hides annually.
