= Julius Boesel House =

Historic house in Ohio, United States

- U.S. National Register of Historic Places
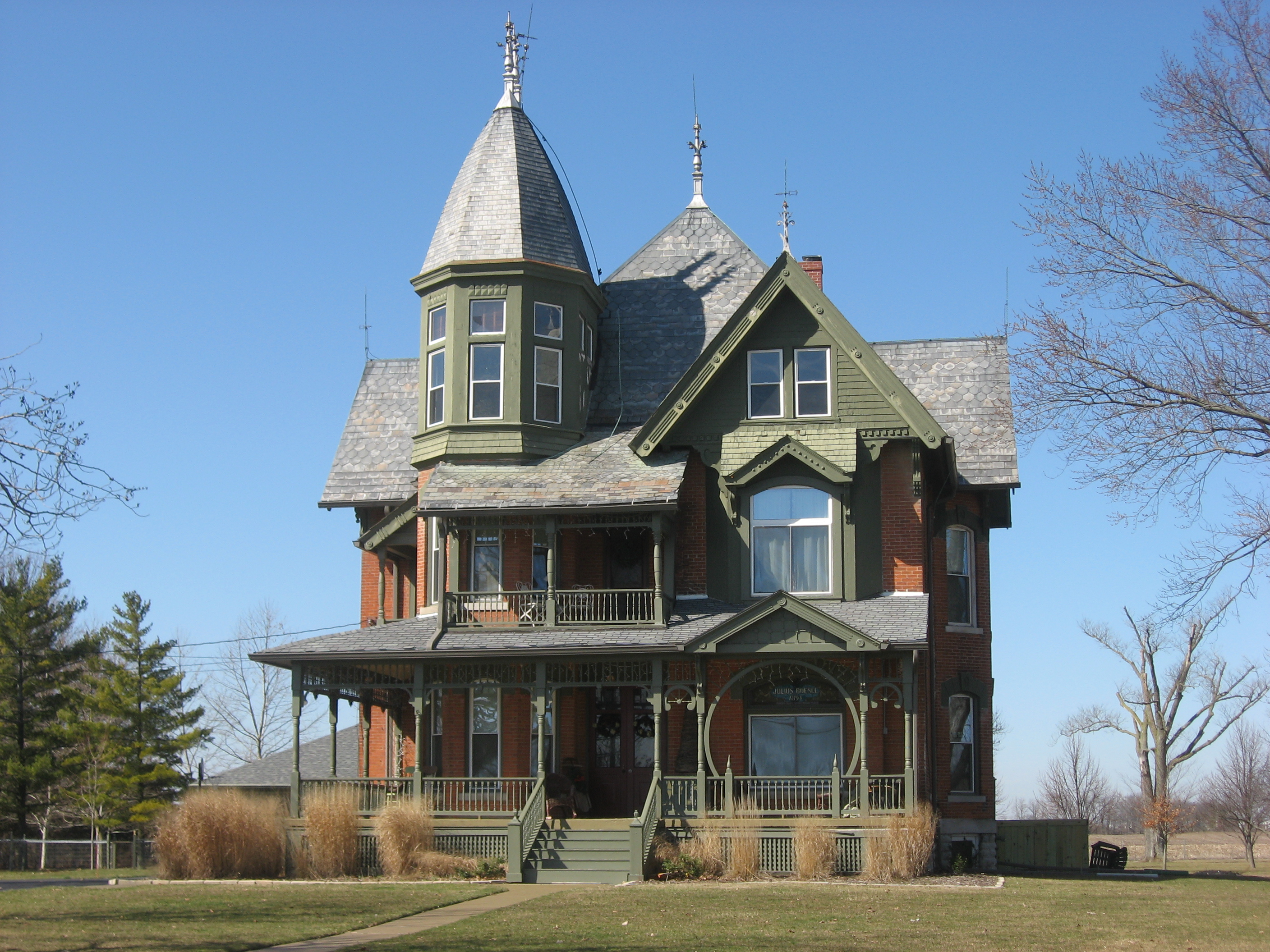
- Front of the house

- Location within Ohio Location within the United States
- Nearest city: New Bremen, Ohio
- Coordinates: 40°26′56″N 84°22′40″W
- Area: less than one acre
- Built: 1895
- Architect: J.A. Chapin, after George F. Barber
- Architectural style: Queen Anne
- NRHP reference No.: 78002008
- Added to NRHP: March 30, 1978

The Julius Boesel House is a historic house near the village of New Bremen in the northwestern part of the U.S. state of Ohio. Located in German Township in southwestern Auglaize County, it is a well-preserved Queen Anne mansion.

Said to be designed by J.A. Chapin of Lima, the design of the house is based heavily on Design No. 53 from George Franklin Barber's Cottage Souvenir #2. The house was built for Julius Boesel, a leading member of New Bremen society. The design mixed brick and frame construction, sitting atop a stone foundation, to produce this twenty-room, two-and-a-half story house. When Boesel and his family moved into the house in late October 1895, the local newspaper spoke favorably of the new building, calling it "one of the finest in the county" and observing that the "view of the building while coming from Lock Two almost makes a person feel as though he were entering the suburb of a big city." Included on the property was a massive carriage house.

After being extensively modified in the third quarter of the twentieth century, the house was purchased in 1976 by Donald and Jacqui Kuck, who began a long-term restoration program. Included in their program was the removal of intrusive elements such as lowered ceilings and carpets on the walls. The Kucks were able to restore the house to the point that it qualified for addition to the National Register of Historic Places, and it was listed on the Register on March 30, 1985.
