= German Township, Auglaize County, Ohio =

Township in Ohio, US

- Township
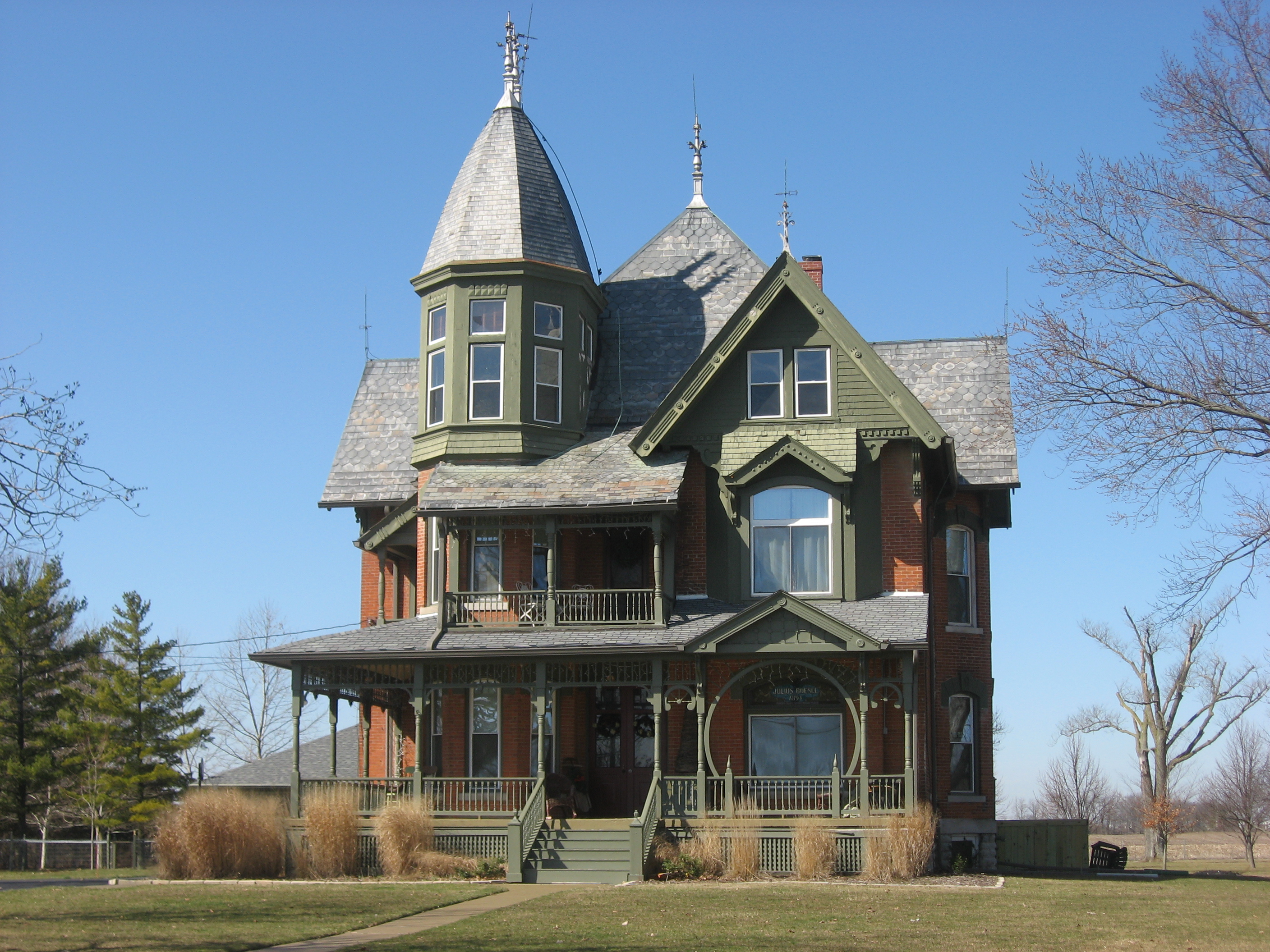
- The Julius Boesel House, a landmark in the township

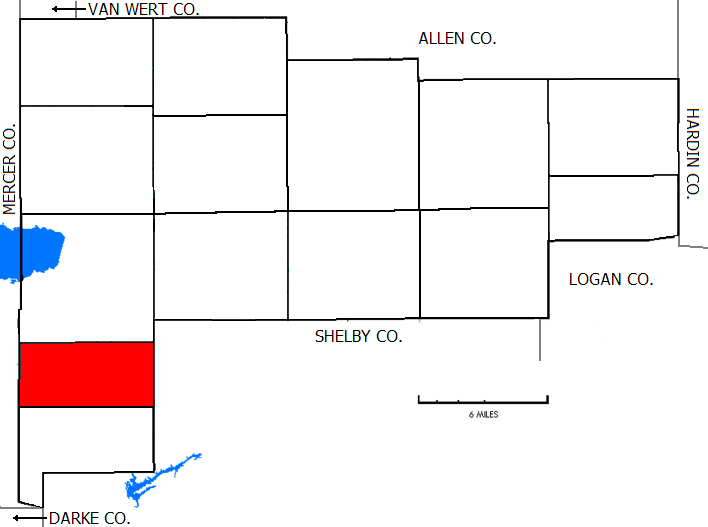
- Location of German Township in Auglaize County
- Coordinates: 40°26′25″N 84°23′0″W
- Country: United States
- State: Ohio
- County: Auglaize

Area
  - Total: 18.5 sq mi (47.8 km^{2})
  - Land: 18.5 sq mi (47.8 km^{2})
  - Water: 0 sq mi (0.0 km^{2})
- Elevation: 935 ft (285 m)

Population (2020)
  - Total: 3,751
  - Density: 203/sq mi (78.4/km^{2})
- Time zone: UTC-5 (Eastern (EST))
  - Summer (DST): UTC-4 (EDT)
- FIPS code: 39-29848
- GNIS feature ID: 1085764

German Township is one of the fourteen townships of Auglaize County, Ohio, United States. The 2020 census found 3,751 people in the township.

== Geography ==
Located in the southwestern part of the county, it borders the following townships:

- Saint Marys Township - north
- Van Buren Township, Shelby County - east
- McLean Township, Shelby County - southeast corner
- Jackson Township - south
- Marion Township, Mercer County - southwest
- Franklin Township, Mercer County - northwest

The village of New Bremen is located in eastern German Township, and the unincorporated community of Lock Two lies in the northeastern part of the township.

According to the U.S. Census Bureau, German Township has an area of 18.5 square miles (47.8 km^{2}).

== Name and history ==
It is one of five German Townships statewide.

Formed while still part of Mercer County, the township originally included Jackson Township until separation in 1858. One house in the township, the Julius Boesel House just north of New Bremen, is listed on the National Register of Historic Places.

== Government ==
The township is governed by a three-member board of trustees, who are elected in November of odd-numbered years to a four-year term beginning on the following January 1. Two are elected in the year after the presidential election and one is elected in the year before it. There is also an elected township fiscal officer, who serves a four-year term beginning on April 1 of the year after the election, which is held in November of the year before the presidential election. Vacancies in the fiscal officership or on the board of trustees are filled by the remaining trustees.

== Public services ==
The majority of the township is in the New Bremen School District with southwestern portions being located the Marion Local School District.

The majority of the township is served by the New Bremen (45869) post office, while the southeastern section of the township is served by the Minster (45865) post office.
