= Miami and Erie Canal Deep Cut =

- Miami and Erie Canal, Deep Cut
- U.S. National Register of Historic Places
- U.S. National Historic Landmark
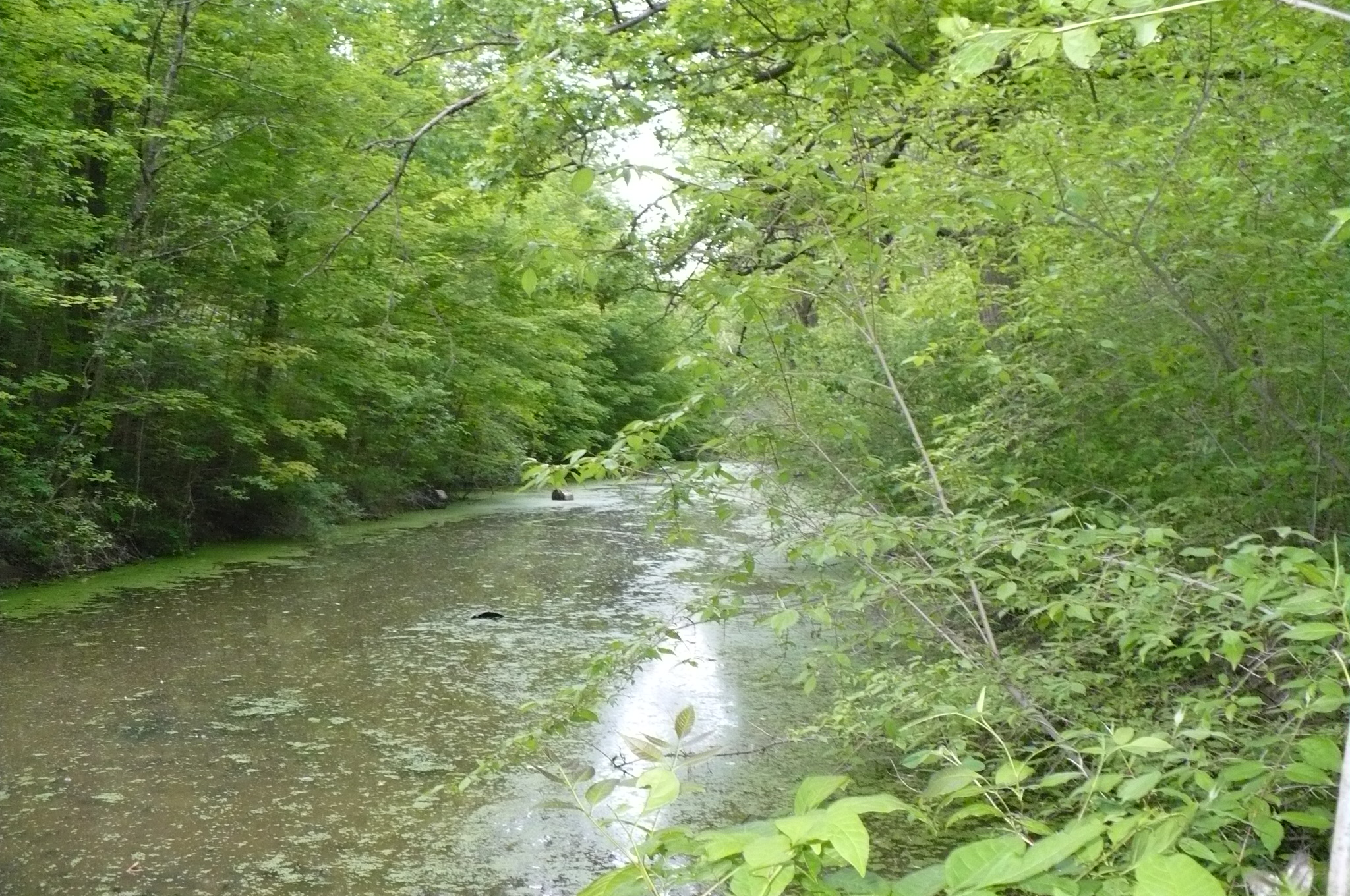
- Deep Cut in 2008

- Location within Ohio Location within the United States
- Location: Allen / Auglaize counties, Ohio, USA
- Nearest city: Spencerville, Ohio
- Coordinates: 40°41′15″N 84°21′55″W
- Area: 2 acres (0.81 ha)
- Built: 1825
- NRHP reference No.: 66000603

Significant dates
- Added to NRHP: October 15, 1966
- Designated NHL: January 29, 1964

The Miami and Erie Canal Deep Cut is a well-preserved long section of the Miami and Erie Canal near Spencerville in western Ohio. The 6,600-foot (2,000 m) segment represents one of the major construction efforts of the canal; in order to avoid using locks to go over a ridge, the canal was dug deeply into it, far more than the 5-foot (1.5 m) depth of the canal itself. Workers dug the canal bed up to 52 feet (16 m) into the blue clay ridge that separated the St. Marys and Auglaize River watersheds. It is a United States National Historic Landmark. The cut is owned by the state and managed jointly by Johnny Appleseed MetroParks and the Heritage Trails Park District as Deep Cut Historical Park, with multi-use trails and a picnic area.

== Description and history ==
The Miami and Erie Canal was one of Ohio's two major artificial waterways. Built between 1825 and 1845, the canal stretched from Cincinnati to Toledo, by way of Dayton; the canal brought settlers into western Ohio and provided access to markets for farmers. Construction of the canal, in particular the cut, was an extremely labor-intensive job, performed by local hires, convicted criminals, and Irish immigrants. The advent of railroads gradually rendered the canal system obsolete.

The Deep Cut is located two miles (3 km) south of Spencerville on State Route 66. It was declared a National Historic Landmark in 1964. The boundaries of the National Historic Landmark area are State Route 66, Mendon Road, Route 66A, and Henne Road, spanning the Allen/Auglaize county line.

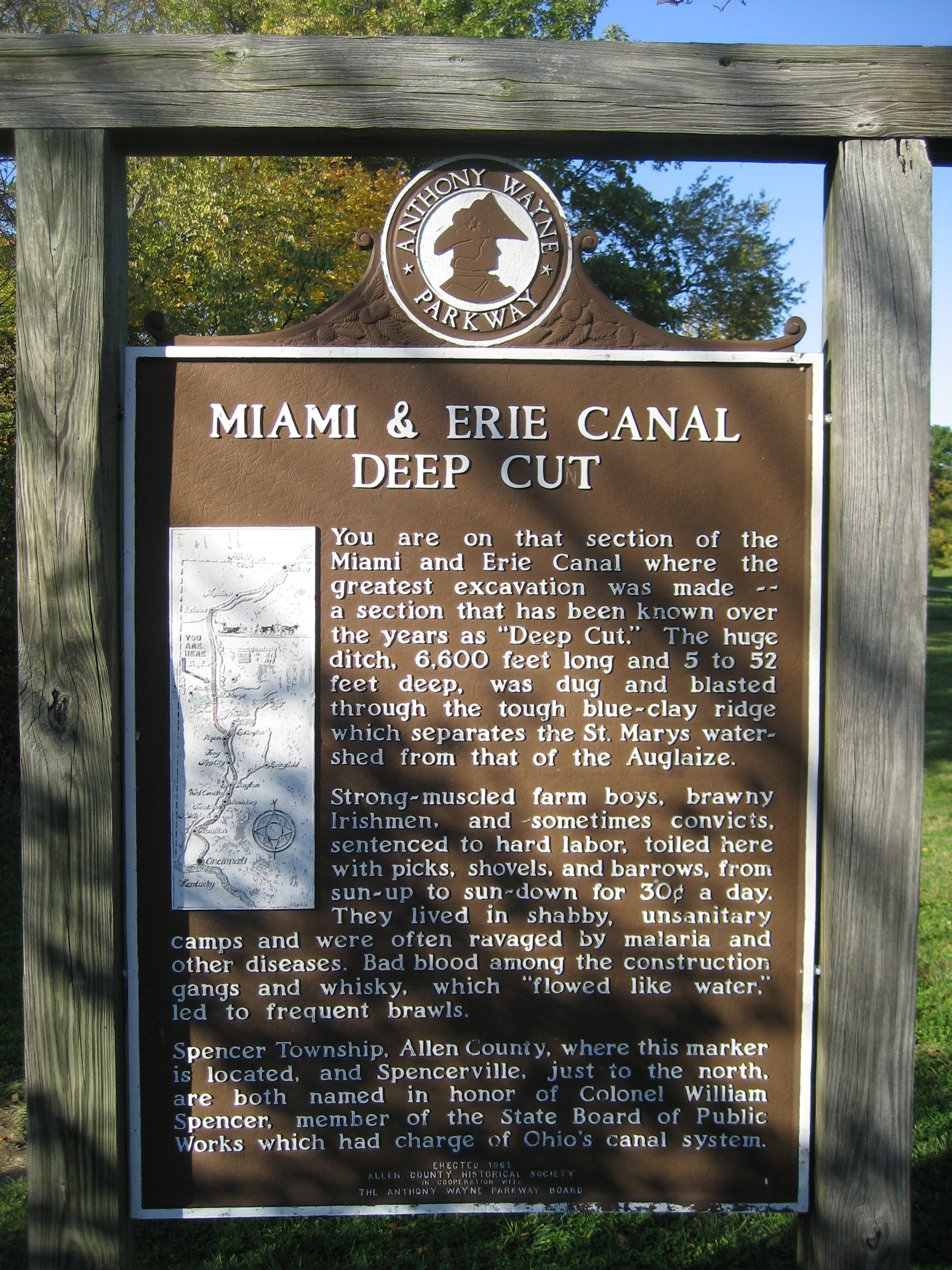

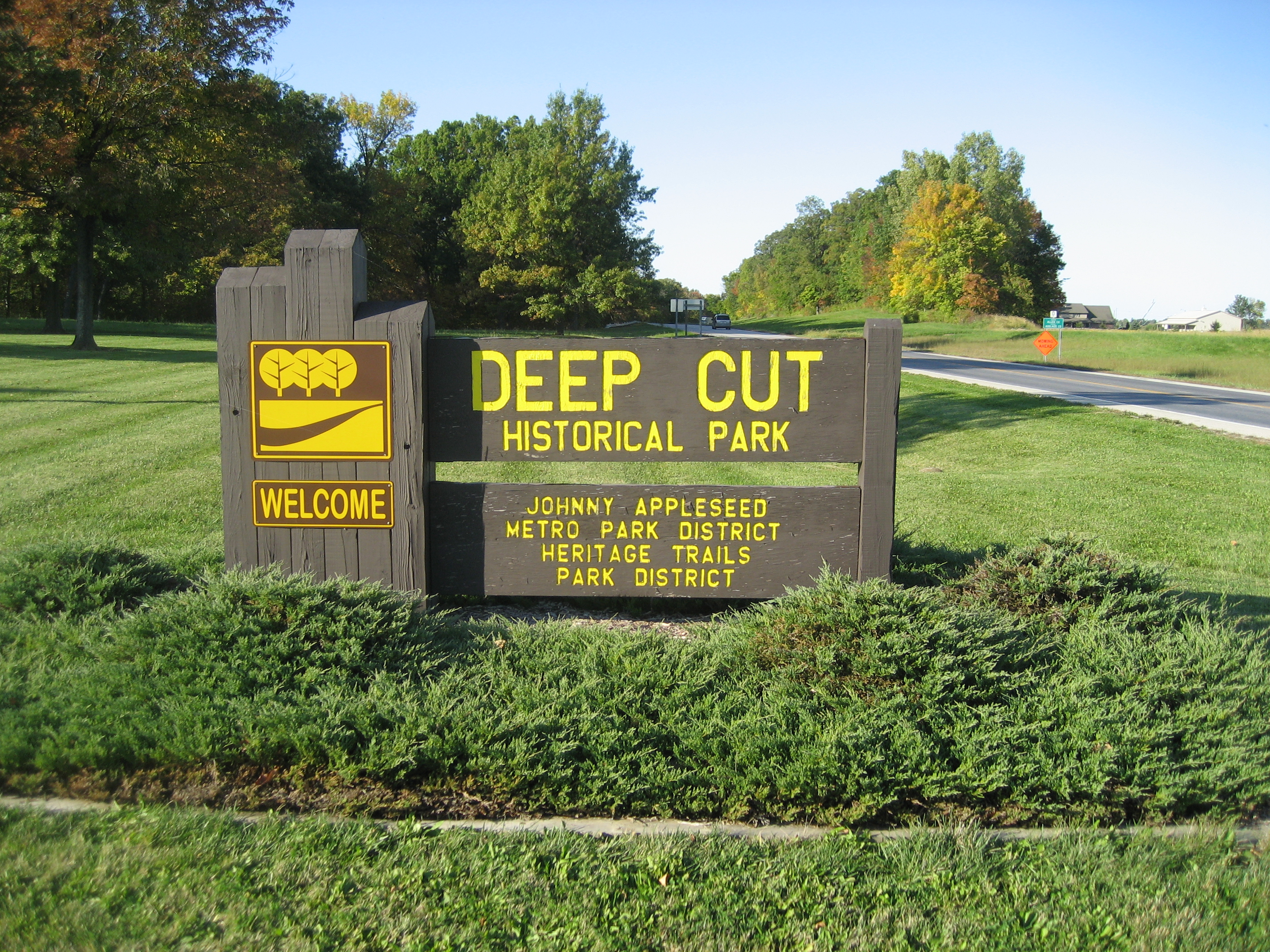

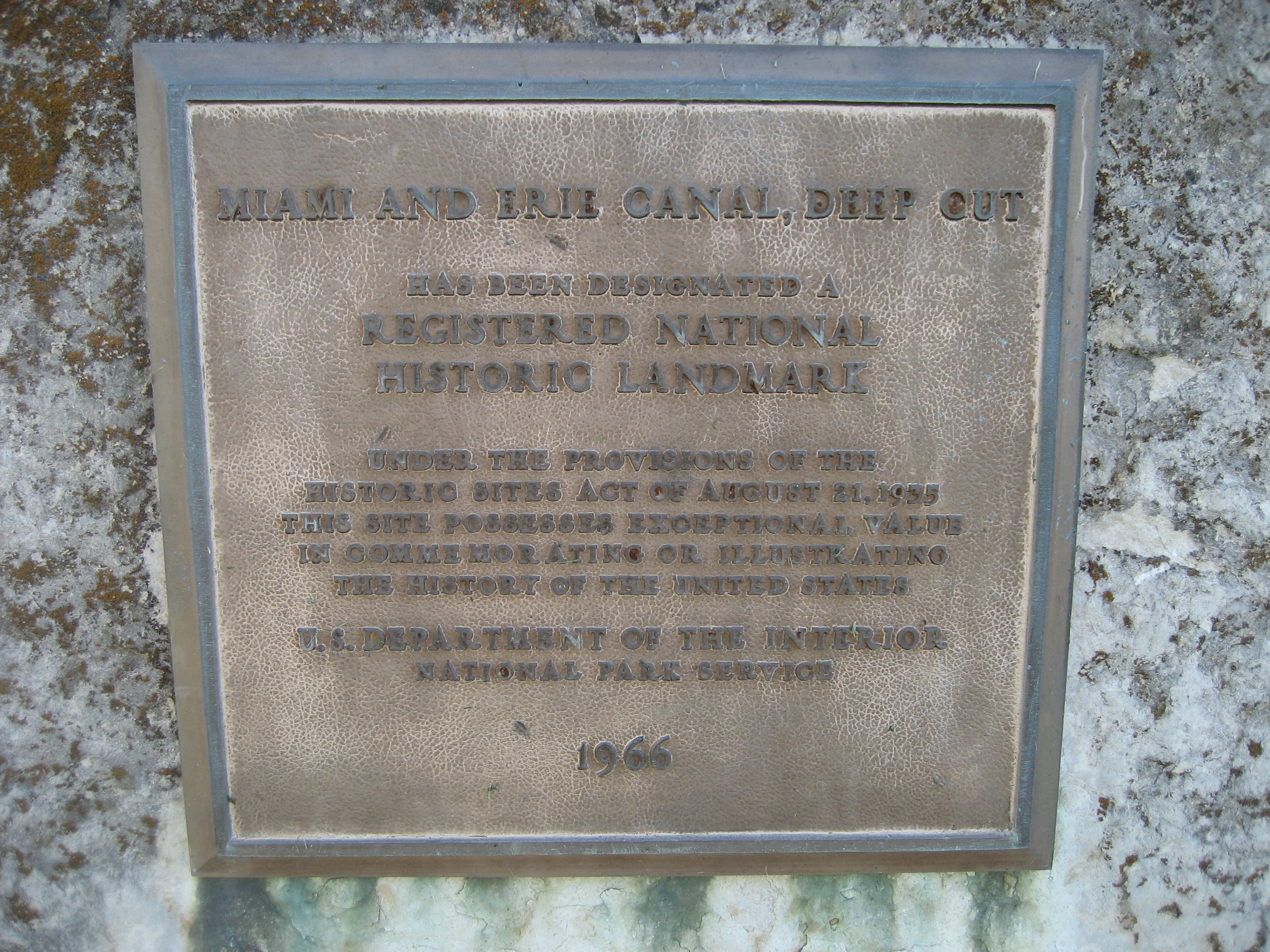

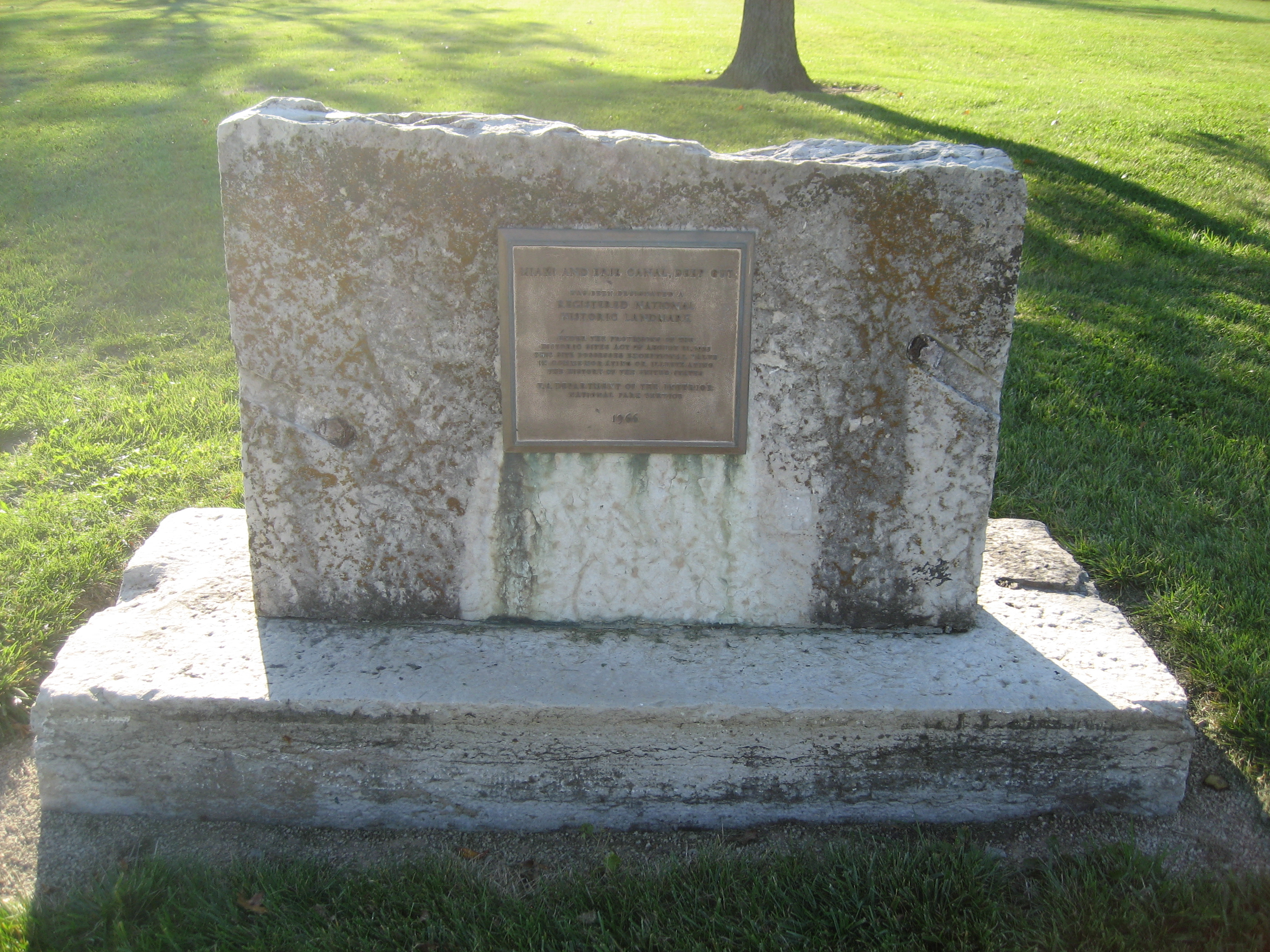
