= Bulkhead, Ohio =

Community in Auglaize County, Ohio, US

- Unincorporated community
- Location within Ohio
- Coordinates: 40°31′14″N 84°25′17″W
- Country: United States
- State: Ohio
- Counties: Auglaize
- Elevation: 866 ft (264 m)
- Time zone: UTC-5 (Eastern (EST))
  - Summer (DST): UTC-4 (EDT)
- ZIP code: 45885
- Area code: 419
- GNIS feature ID: 1062678

Bulkhead is an unincorporated community in Saint Marys Township, Auglaize County, Ohio, United States. It is located southwest of St. Marys on the eastern shore of Grand Lake along Ohio State Route 364.

One of the Miami and Erie Canal feeder canals is located in Bulkhead.
