= Egypt, Ohio =

Unincorporated community in Ohio, U.S.

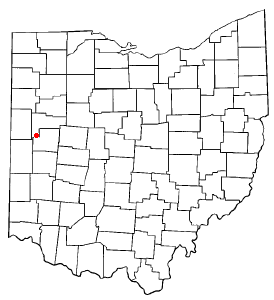

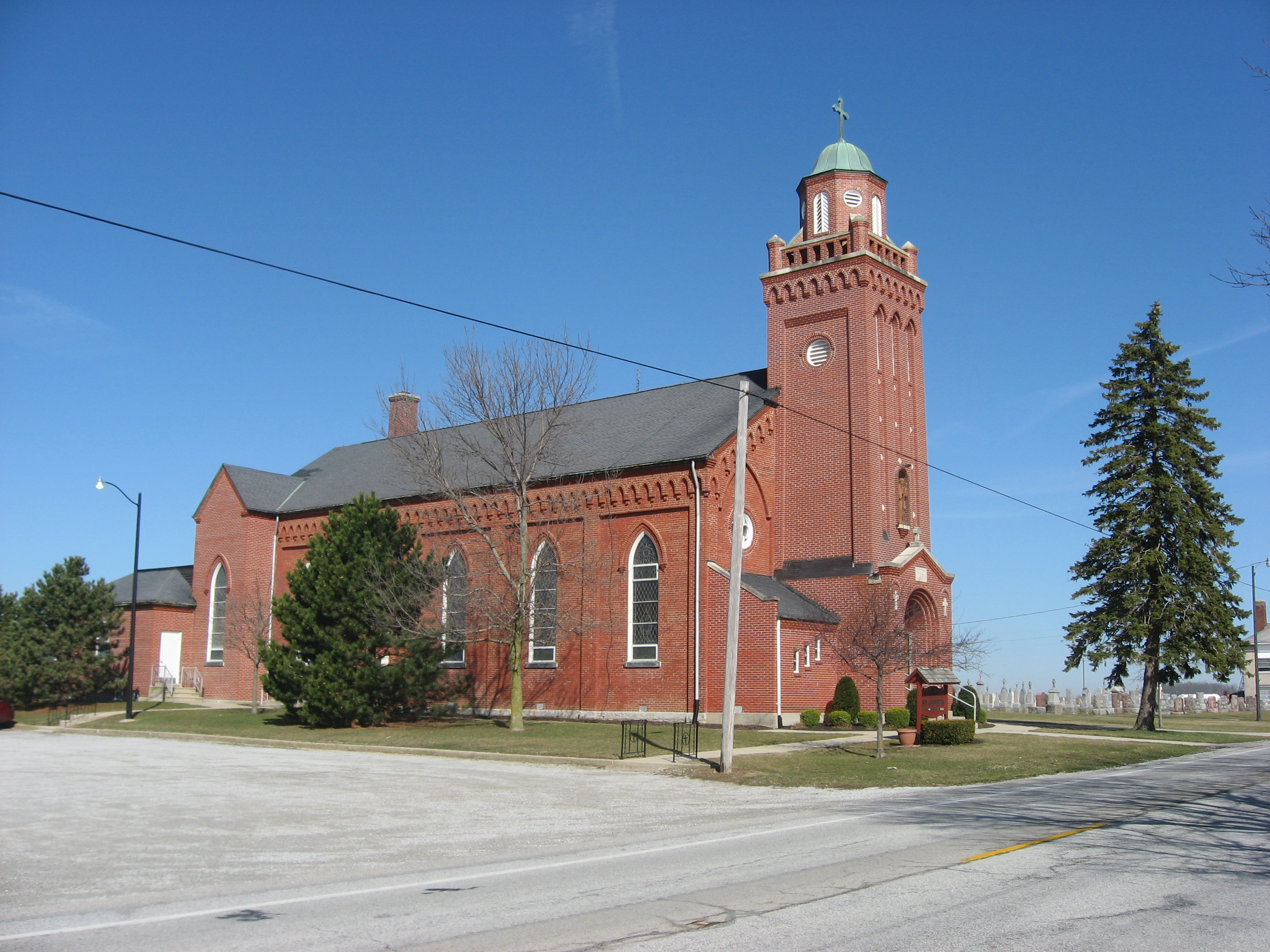
St. Joseph's Catholic Church

Egypt is an unincorporated community in western Jackson Township, Auglaize County, Ohio, United States. Located at 40°23′8″N 84°25′59″W, the community sits at an elevation of 971 feet (296 m), approximately 2 miles (3.2 km) west of the village of Minster.

In the community's earliest years, travel in the vicinity was extremely difficult due to the muck of the Great Black Swamp. The name "Egypt" was supplied by one of the early pioneers. The community remained small; some of the early settlers are said to have remarked that "this place smells". Because the people of the community could only attend church in Minster with great difficulty, they made a petition for a church in Egypt; accordingly, St. Joseph's Catholic Church was organized in 1852.

Egypt has always been small; its people were collectively able to raise only eight hundred dollars for the construction of their new church in 1852, and in 1977 it had only a single business. It is distinguished by St. Joseph's Church, which was added to the National Register of Historic Places in 1979. The community also includes a cemetery, as well as the site of a former school.
