= Nidec-Shimpo America Corporation =

Company building machinery and tools

- Nidec-Shimpo America Corporation
- Founded: 1974
- Headquarters: Glendale Heights, Illinois, United States
- Products: Gear Drive Technology
- Number of employees: 50
- Website: nidec-shimpo.com

NIDEC-SHIMPO America Corporation is the North American subsidiary of Japan-based NIDEC-SHIMPO Corporation. NIDEC-SHIMPO is a manufacturer of planetary, worm, hypoid, bevel, strain wave and cycloidal gears.

== Affiliated companies ==
=== NIDEC Corporation ===
With annual sales exceeding $15 Billion for the fiscal year 2022, the NIDEC Corporation (NYSE:NJ) is a provider of small, mid-size motors and related drive technologies. Founded in 1973 by current Chairman of the Board and CEO, Shigenobu Nagamori, the NIDEC Corporation has a portfolio of motors for hard disk drives and for fans used in consumer appliances or automotive applications. The NIDEC Group consists of more than 150 corporate subsidiaries around the globe. The group totals more than 100,000 employees that are supplying products and services to customers in more than 30 countries. The NIDEC Group companies can be categorized into the following business segments: Motors, Machinery, Optical & Electronic Components, Other (Services & logistics).

=== NIDEC America Corporation ===
The U.S. subsidiary of NIDEC Corporation with offices in Massachusetts, Connecticut, California, Colorado and Minnesota. NIDEC America Corporation consist of technologies to meet the thermal management and motion control needs of the world's designers and manufactures of IT, business equipment, automotive, industrial, and consumer electronic products.

=== NIDEC-SHIMPO ===
Created in 1952, SHIMPO located its corporate headquarters and main production facility in Kyoto, Japan where it remains today. NIDEC-SHIMPO is a supplier of power transmission drive technology, instrumentation and ceramics equipment to the industrial marketplace.

=== Nidec-Minster ===
The Minster Machine Company has corporate headquarters and manufacturing plant in Minster, Ohio. The Nidec Minster Corporation is a supplier of equipment and services for the material forming industry. Minster provides mechanical power presses; feeds; straighteners; reels; coil cars; die transfer tables; press controls; training programs; production monitoring systems; inspection services; preventative maintenance services; remanufacturing services; technical consulting services; press relocation services and other products and programs designed specifically for the material forming market. Today, Nidec-Minster presses and material handling equipment are in production in more than 84 countries around the world.

Nidec Minster is the global headquarters for Nidec Press & Automation. Nidec Press & Automation brands include: Minster, Arisa, Kyori, Vamco, CHS & SYS.

== History ==
Year	Achievements
2012	NIDEC-SHIMPO acquires the MINSTER Company in Ohio - NIDEC MINSTER CORPORATION created
	NIDEC-SHIMPO opens office in Monterrey, Mexico
2011	NIDEC-SHIMPO opens office in Querétaro, Mexico
	NIDEC-SHIMPO opens office in São Paulo, Brazil
	NIDEC-SHIMPO acquires Nidec Kyori Corporation through an absorption-type corporate split transaction from Nidec Corporation
2004	New factory NIDEC-SHIMPO (ZHEJIANG) Corporation was established
	Wholly owned by NIDEC CORPORATION
1998	NIDEC-SHIMPO achieved ISO9001(JQA-1739)
1997	Corporate name was changed to NIDEC-SHIMPO CORPORATION
1983	Received Scientific Technology Administrator Recommendation Award
1982	Received Innovation Achievement Award
1974	NIDEC-SHIMPO AMERICA CORPORATION was established in Chicago
1972	Received Deming Prize for company quality control (TQC)
1965	Received Japan Mechanical Society Award
	Received Japan Invention Award
1959	Received Japan Invention Award
1952	SHIMPO INDUSTRIAL CORPORATION was established
