= Gutman, Ohio =

Unincorporated community in Ohio, U.S.

Coordinates: 40°31′10″N 84°02′38″W

Gutman is an unincorporated community in Auglaize County, in the U.S. state of Ohio.

== History ==
A post office called Gutman was established in 1884, and remained in operation until 1905. The community was named for the local Gutman family, who kept a store there.

A section of the Toledo and Ohio Central Railroad, later absorbed by the New York Central ran through this community before being abandoned in the 1960s. A photo of the T and OC depot at Gutman can be found here
