= Slater, Ohio =

Community in Auglaize County, Ohio, US

- Unincorporated community
- Location within Ohio
- Coordinates: 40°31′40″N 84°04′24″W
- Country: United States
- State: Ohio
- Counties: Auglaize
- Elevation: 1,011 ft (308 m)
- Time zone: UTC-5 (Eastern (EST))
  - Summer (DST): UTC-4 (EDT)
- ZIP code: 45895
- Area code: 419
- GNIS feature ID: 1065335

Slater is an unincorporated community in Clay Township, Auglaize County, Ohio, United States. It is located southeast of Wapakoneta and just south of Saint Johns, on Geyer Road between Clay Road (Township Road 126) and Gutman Road (Township Road 116), at 40°31′40″N 84°04′24″W.

The Slater Crossing Station was built in 1893 for the Ohio Southern Railroad, the building was later moved to a farm south of the Slater railroad crossing and stood until the early 1980s. Although there was never a post office here, Slater, Ohio is listed as a shipping and mailing address with the US Express and on the St. Marys Branch of the Toledo and Ohio Central Railroad in 1903.
