= Jackson Township, Auglaize County, Ohio =

Township in Ohio, US

- Township
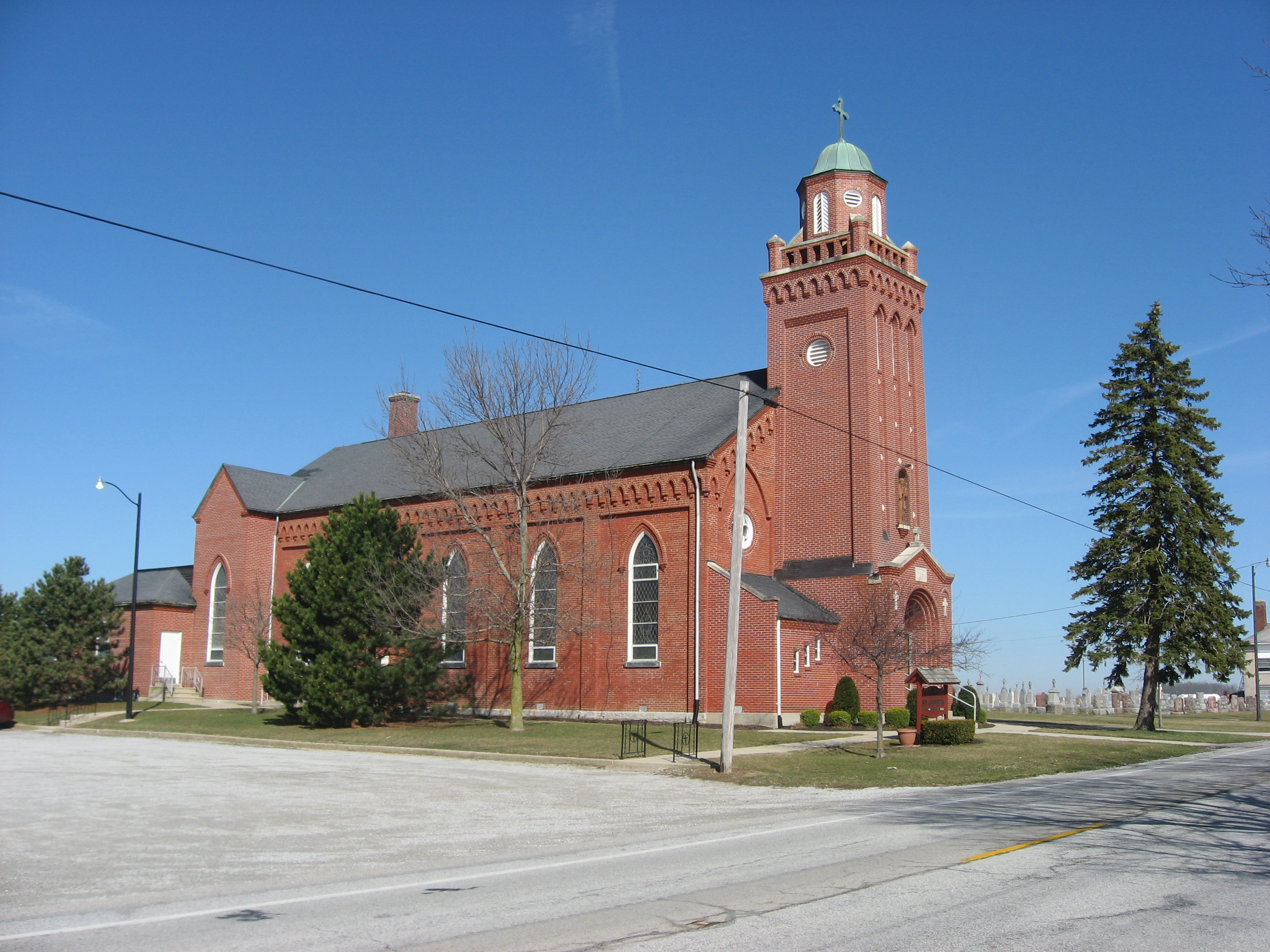
- St. Joseph's Catholic Church at Egypt

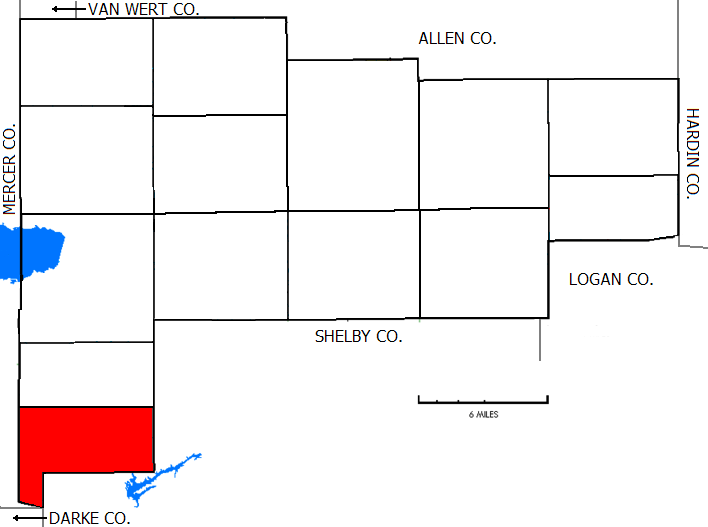
- Location of Jackson Township in Auglaize County
- Coordinates: 40°23′39″N 84°23′10″W
- Country: United States
- State: Ohio
- County: Auglaize

Area
  - Total: 20.3 sq mi (52.6 km^{2})
  - Land: 20.3 sq mi (52.6 km^{2})
  - Water: 0 sq mi (0.0 km^{2})
- Elevation: 961 ft (293 m)

Population (2020)
  - Total: 4,011
  - Density: 197/sq mi (76.3/km^{2})
- Time zone: UTC-5 (Eastern (EST))
  - Summer (DST): UTC-4 (EDT)
- FIPS code: 39-37674
- GNIS feature ID: 1085766

Jackson Township is one of the fourteen townships of Auglaize County, Ohio, United States. The 2020 census found 4,011 people in the township.

== Geography ==
Located in the far southwestern part of the county, it borders the following townships:

- German Township - north
- Van Buren Township, Shelby County - northeast corner
- McLean Township, Shelby County - east and south
- Marion Township, Mercer County - west

The village of Minster is located in eastern Jackson Township, and a small portion of the village of New Bremen lies in its far northeast corner. As well, the unincorporated community of Egypt lies in the township's west.

According to the U.S. Census Bureau, Jackson Township has an area of 20.3 square miles (52.6 km^{2}). A tiny part of Lake Loramie is located in the township's southeast.

== Name and history ==
It is one of thirty-seven Jackson Townships statewide.

Originally a part of German Township, the township was formed in 1858.

== Government ==
The township is governed by a three-member board of trustees, who are elected in November of odd-numbered years to a four-year term beginning on the following January 1. Two are elected in the year after the presidential election and one is elected in the year before it. There is also an elected township fiscal officer, who serves a four-year term beginning on April 1 of the year after the election, which is held in November of the year before the presidential election. Vacancies in the fiscal officership or on the board of trustees are filled by the remaining trustees.

== Public services ==
The majority of the township is in the Minster School District with western portions being located in the Marion Local School District.

The majority of the township is served by the Minster (45865) post office, with the southwestern section of the township served by the Fort Loramie (45845) post office.
