= Villa Nova, Ohio =

Community in Auglaize County, Ohio, US

- Unincorporated community
- Location within Ohio
- Coordinates: 40°32′39″N 84°25′41″W
- Country: United States
- State: Ohio
- Counties: Auglaize
- Elevation: 873 ft (266 m)
- Time zone: UTC-5 (Eastern (EST))
  - Summer (DST): UTC-4 (EDT)
- ZIP code: 45885
- Area code: 419
- GNIS feature ID: 2630978

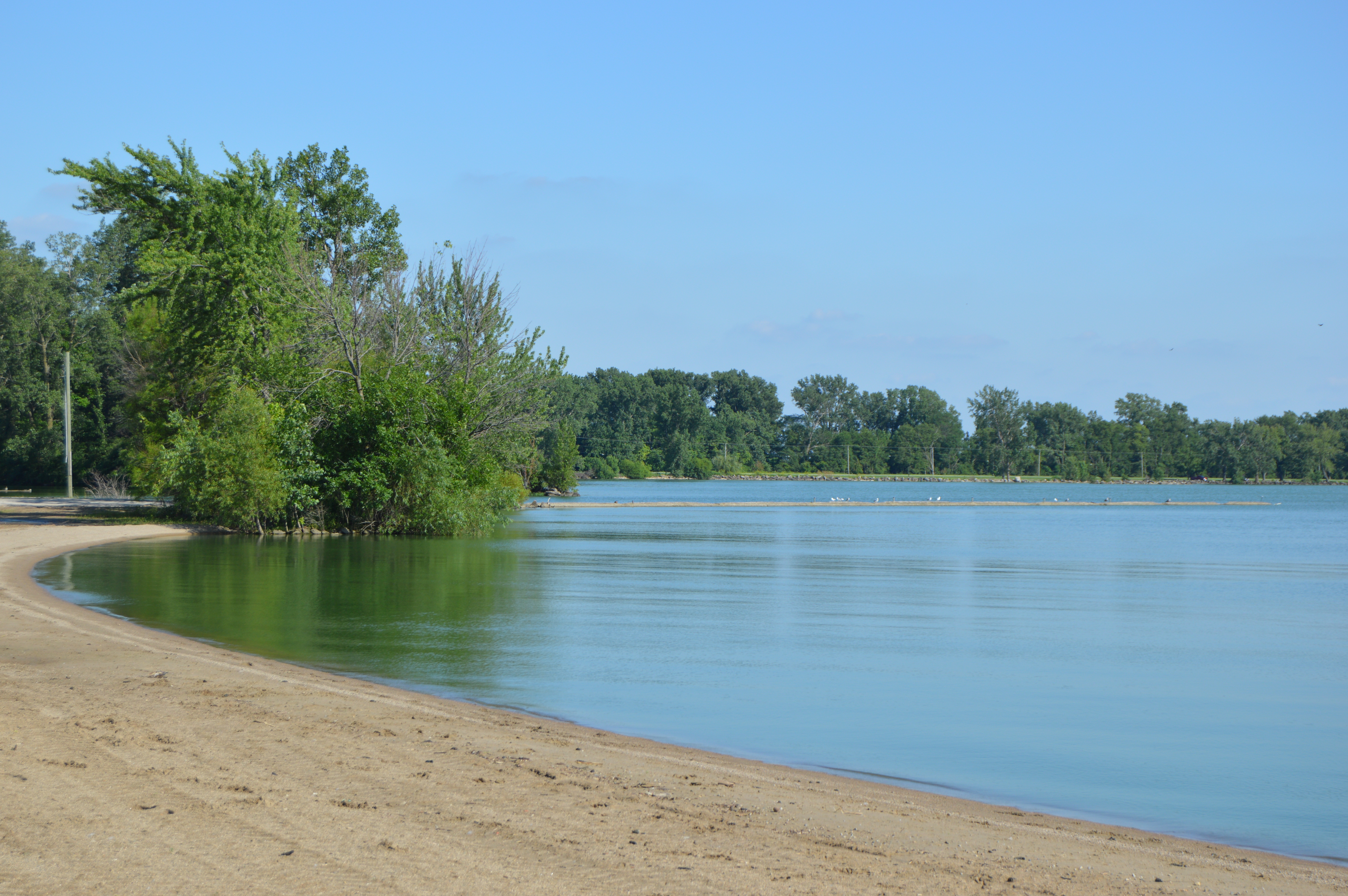
Grand Lake St Marys from Villa Nova

Villa Nova is an unincorporated community in Saint Marys Township, Auglaize County, Ohio, United States. It is located just west of Saint Marys on the northeastern corner of Grand Lake at the intersection of Ohio State Route 703 (Celina Road) and Ohio State Route 364 (Park Road).
