= Lock Two, Ohio =

Unincorporated community in Ohio, U.S.

Coordinates: 40°27′6″N 84°22′6″W

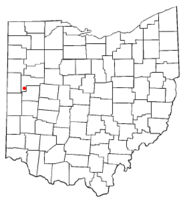
Location of Lock Two, Ohio

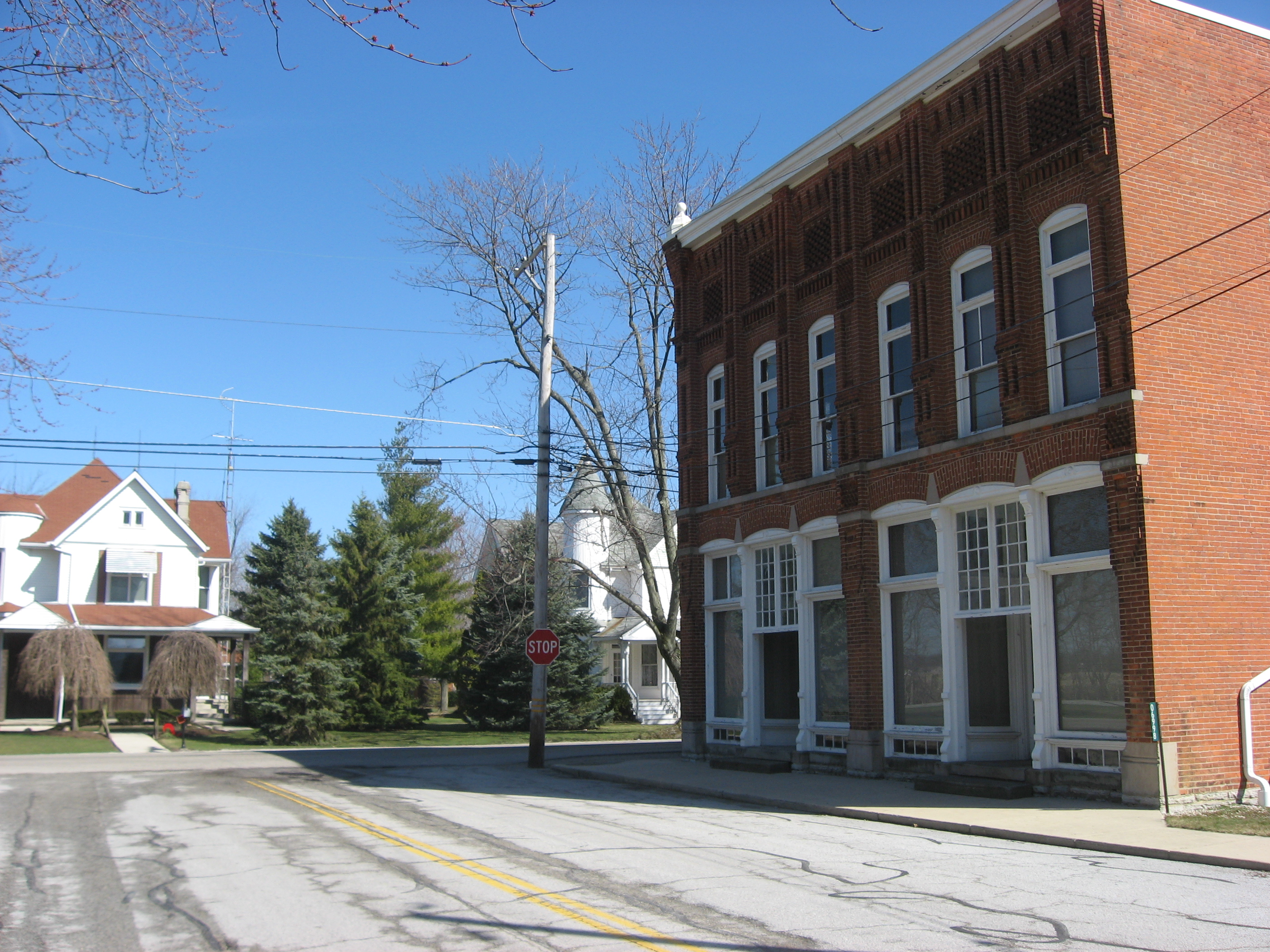
Buildings in central Lock Two

Lock Two is an unincorporated community in northeastern German Township, Auglaize County in the west central part of the U.S. state of Ohio.

Adjacent to New Bremen, Lock Two formed around the second lock of the Miami and Erie Canal north of the canal's summit at Lake Loramie. The community is served by the New Bremen Local School District and the New Bremen (45869) Post Office.
