= Auglaize County, Ohio =

County in Ohio, United States

- County
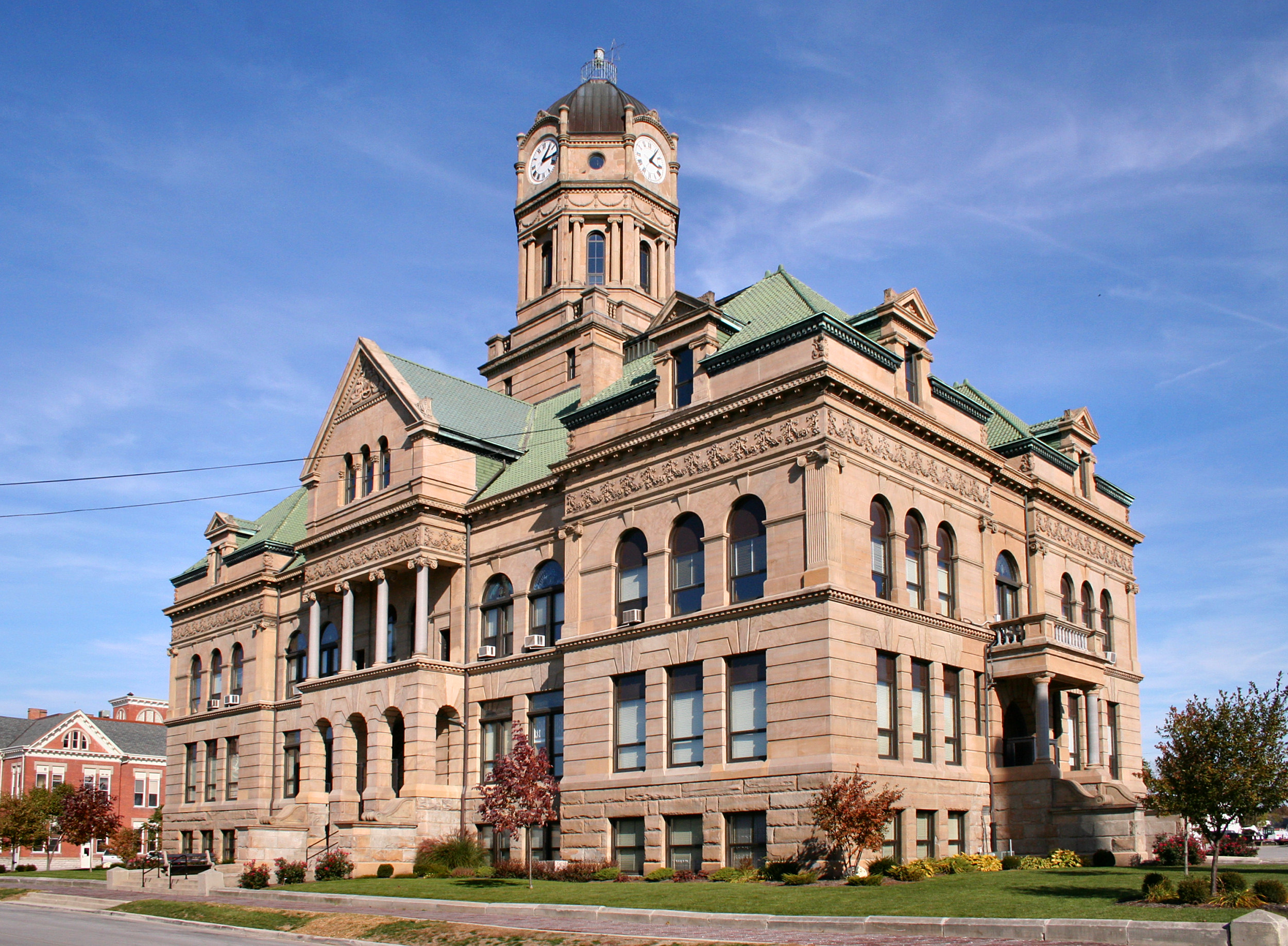
- County courthouse in Wapakoneta

- Flag Seal

- Location within the U.S. state of Ohio
- Coordinates: 40°34′N 84°13′W
- Country: United States
- State: Ohio
- Founded: February 14, 1848
- Named for: Auglaize River
- Seat: Wapakoneta
- Largest city: Wapakoneta

Area
  - Total: 402 sq mi (1,040 km^{2})
  - Land: 401 sq mi (1,040 km^{2})
  - Water: 0.5 sq mi (1.3 km^{2}) 0.1%

Population (2020)
  - Total: 46,422
  - Estimate (2025): 45,909 ▼
  - Density: 116/sq mi (45/km^{2})
- Time zone: UTC−5 (Eastern)
  - Summer (DST): UTC−4 (EDT)
- Congressional district: 4th
- Website: www.auglaizecounty.org

Auglaize County (/ˈɔːɡleɪz/ AW-glayz) is a county in Northwestern Ohio, United States of America. As of the 2020 census, the population was 46,442. Its county seat and largest city is Wapakoneta.

Auglaize County comprises the Wapakoneta Micropolitan Statistical Area, which is also included in the Lima-Van Wert-Celina Combined Statistical Area.

== Etymology ==
The county is named for the Auglaize River. Some sources say it is a corruption of the French description of the clay (glaise) water (eau); others say it comes from a Native American word for fallen timbers. Another remote possibility is that it derives from the French glace [*aux glaces?], meaning "mirror" or "ice" ['at the ices'?].

== Geography ==
According to the U.S. Census Bureau, the county has an area of 402 square miles (1,040 km^{2}), of which 401 square miles (1,040 km^{2}) is land and 0.5 square miles (1.3 km^{2}) (0.1%) is water. It is Ohio's second-smallest county by area.

The county is crossed by the Auglaize River and the Miami and Erie Canal. The headwaters of the Saint Marys River, the Great Miami River and the Scioto River as well as parts of Grand Lake and Lake Loramie are in the county.

=== Adjacent counties ===
- Allen County - north
- Hardin County - east
- Logan County - southeast
- Shelby County - south
- Mercer County - west
- Van Wert County - northwest

== Demographics ==
Historical population
Census	Pop.	Note	%±
1850	11,338		—
1860	17,187		51.6%
1870	20,041		16.6%
1880	25,444		27.0%
1890	28,100		10.4%
1900	31,192		11.0%
1910	31,246		0.2%
1920	29,527		−5.5%
1930	28,034		−5.1%
1940	28,037		0.0%
1950	30,637		9.3%
1960	36,147		18.0%
1970	38,602		6.8%
1980	42,554		10.2%
1990	44,585		4.8%
2000	46,611		4.5%
2010	45,949		−1.4%
2020	46,422		1.0%
2025 (est.)	45,909	▼	−1.1%
U.S. Decennial Census; 1790-1960 1900-1990; 1990-2000 2020

=== 2020 census ===
As of the 2020 census, the county had a population of 46,422. The median age was 41.3 years. 23.8% of residents were under the age of 18 and 19.4% of residents were 65 years of age or older. For every 100 females there were 98.7 males, and for every 100 females age 18 and over there were 97.1 males age 18 and over.

The racial makeup of the county was 94.6% White, 0.5% Black or African American, 0.2% American Indian and Alaska Native, 0.5% Asian, 0.1% Native Hawaiian and Pacific Islander, 0.6% from some other race, and 3.4% from two or more races. Hispanic or Latino residents of any race comprised 1.7% of the population.

61.3% of residents lived in urban areas, while 38.7% lived in rural areas.

There were 18,602 households in the county, of which 29.3% had children under the age of 18 living in them. Of all households, 54.4% were married-couple households, 17.4% were households with a male householder and no spouse or partner present, and 21.9% were households with a female householder and no spouse or partner present. About 27.0% of all households were made up of individuals and 12.9% had someone living alone who was 65 years of age or older.

There were 19,873 housing units, of which 6.4% were vacant. Among occupied housing units, 75.6% were owner-occupied and 24.4% were renter-occupied. The homeowner vacancy rate was 1.1% and the rental vacancy rate was 5.2%.

=== Racial and ethnic composition ===
Auglaize County, Ohio – Racial and ethnic composition Note: the US Census treats Hispanic/Latino as an ethnic category. This table excludes Latinos from the racial categories and assigns them to a separate category. Hispanics/Latinos may be of any race.
Race / Ethnicity (NH = Non-Hispanic)	Pop 1980	Pop 1990	Pop 2000	Pop 2010	Pop 2020	% 1980	% 1990	% 2000	% 2010	% 2020
White alone (NH)	42,254	44,058	45,553	44,625	43,643	99.30%	98.82%	97.73%	97.12%	94.01%
Black or African American alone (NH)	37	65	109	124	231	0.09%	0.15%	0.23%	0.27%	0.50%
Native American or Alaska Native alone (NH)	15	40	76	75	76	0.04%	0.09%	0.16%	0.16%	0.16%
Asian alone (NH)	68	165	188	165	242	0.16%	0.37%	0.40%	0.36%	0.52%
Native Hawaiian or Pacific Islander alone (NH)	x	x	11	16	40	x	x	0.02%	0.03%	0.09%
Other race alone (NH)	29	14	16	25	71	0.07%	0.03%	0.03%	0.05%	0.15%
Mixed race or Multiracial (NH)	x	x	348	376	1,338	x	x	0.75%	0.82%	2.88%
Hispanic or Latino (any race)	151	243	310	543	781	0.35%	0.55%	0.67%	1.18%	1.68%
Total	42,554	44,585	46,611	45,949	46,422	100.00%	100.00%	100.00%	100.00%	100.00%

=== 2010 census ===
As of the 2010 United States census, there were 45,949 people, 17,972 households, and 12,749 families residing in the county. The population density was 114.5 inhabitants per square mile (44.2/km^{2}). There were 19,585 housing units at an average density of 48.8 units per square mile (18.8 units/km^{2}). The racial makeup of the county was 97.8% white, 0.4% Asian, 0.3% black or African American, 0.2% American Indian, 0.3% from other races, and 0.9% from two or more races. Those of Hispanic or Latino origin made up 1.2% of the population. In terms of ancestry, 53.0% were German, 12.6% were Irish, 8.9% were American, and 8.0% were English.

Of the 17,972 households, 32.8% had children under the age of 18 living with them, 57.9% were married couples living together, 8.5% had a female householder with no husband present, 29.1% were non-families, and 25.3% of all households were made up of individuals. The average household size was 2.53 and the average family size was 3.02. The median age was 40.0 years.

The median income for a household in the county was $52,018 and the median income for a family was $60,318. Males had a median income of $44,267 versus $30,591 for females. The per capita income for the county was $25,290. About 5.8% of families and 7.2% of the population were below the poverty line, including 9.5% of those under age 18 and 4.6% of those age 65 or over.

=== 2000 census ===
As of the census of 2000, there were 46,611 people, 17,376 households, and 12,771 families residing in the county. The population density was 116 inhabitants per square mile (45/km^{2}). There were 18,470 housing units at an average density of 46 units per square mile (18/km^{2}). The racial makeup of the county was 98.12% White, 0.24% Black or African American, 0.18% Native American, 0.41% Asian, 0.03% Pacific Islander, 0.20% from other races, and 0.83% from two or more races. 0.67% of the population were Hispanic or Latino of any race. 59.5% were of German, 10.9% American, 6.9% Irish and 6.3% English ancestry according to Census 2000. 97.9% spoke English and 1.2% Spanish as their first language.

There were 17,376 households, out of which 35.30% had children under the age of 18 living with them, 62.10% were married couples living together, 7.80% had a female householder with no husband present, and 26.50% were non-families. 23.30% of all households were made up of individuals, and 10.50% had someone living alone who was 65 years of age or older. The average household size was 2.62 and the average family size was 3.11.

In the county, the population was spread out, with 27.60% under the age of 18, 7.80% from 18 to 24, 28.20% from 25 to 44, 22.00% from 45 to 64, and 14.40% who were 65 years of age or older. The median age was 36 years. For every 100 females, there were 96.50 males. For every 100 females age 18 and over, there were 93.10 males.

The median income for a household in the county was $43,367, and the median income for a family was $50,024. Males had a median income of $37,024 versus $23,809 for females. The per capita income for the county was $19,593. About 4.90% of families and 6.20% of the population were below the poverty line, including 7.20% of those under age 18 and 6.40% of those age 65 or over.

== Politics ==
Prior to 1920, Auglaize County consistently voted for Democratic candidates in presidential elections. Since 1920, Democrats have won the county three times in presidential elections, all in years where the party won nationally by a landslide.

United States presidential election results for Auglaize County, Ohio
Year	Republican		Democratic		Third party(ies)	
Year	No.	%	No.	%	No.	%
1856	912	35.02%	1,604	61.60%	88	3.38%
1860	1,088	36.09%	1,836	60.90%	91	3.02%
1864	1,180	33.17%	2,377	66.83%	0	0.00%
1868	1,266	31.49%	2,754	68.51%	0	0.00%
1872	1,180	31.12%	2,535	66.85%	77	2.03%
1876	1,521	29.90%	3,560	69.98%	6	0.12%
1880	1,837	33.70%	3,599	66.02%	15	0.28%
1884	2,026	34.21%	3,882	65.55%	14	0.24%
1888	2,212	35.55%	3,928	63.12%	83	1.33%
1892	2,113	33.68%	3,774	60.16%	386	6.15%
1896	2,900	36.75%	4,939	62.59%	52	0.66%
1900	2,895	37.18%	4,812	61.80%	79	1.01%
1904	3,049	44.63%	3,619	52.98%	163	2.39%
1908	3,001	38.55%	4,622	59.38%	161	2.07%
1912	1,401	20.99%	3,726	55.81%	1,549	23.20%
1916	2,763	38.51%	4,124	57.48%	288	4.01%
1920	6,752	57.45%	4,792	40.78%	208	1.77%
1924	5,507	51.86%	3,952	37.22%	1,159	10.92%
1928	7,794	60.90%	4,954	38.71%	50	0.39%
1932	5,039	38.15%	8,036	60.83%	135	1.02%
1936	5,526	38.63%	7,835	54.77%	944	6.60%
1940	8,953	61.08%	5,704	38.92%	0	0.00%
1944	8,980	64.75%	4,888	35.25%	0	0.00%
1948	6,818	54.45%	5,670	45.28%	34	0.27%
1952	10,599	67.30%	5,149	32.70%	0	0.00%
1956	11,453	72.07%	4,438	27.93%	0	0.00%
1960	11,183	64.03%	6,282	35.97%	0	0.00%
1964	7,954	47.96%	8,632	52.04%	0	0.00%
1968	9,368	56.96%	5,550	33.74%	1,529	9.30%
1972	11,900	69.81%	4,617	27.08%	530	3.11%
1976	9,772	61.21%	5,840	36.58%	353	2.21%
1980	11,537	65.34%	5,022	28.44%	1,098	6.22%
1984	14,766	77.72%	4,102	21.59%	132	0.69%
1988	13,562	73.39%	4,756	25.74%	161	0.87%
1992	10,455	51.49%	4,960	24.43%	4,891	24.09%
1996	10,169	51.80%	6,652	33.88%	2,811	14.32%
2000	13,770	69.22%	5,564	27.97%	558	2.81%
2004	17,016	73.87%	5,903	25.63%	115	0.50%
2008	16,414	69.67%	6,738	28.60%	407	1.73%
2012	17,169	73.22%	5,831	24.87%	449	1.91%
2016	18,658	78.41%	3,980	16.73%	1,156	4.86%
2020	20,798	80.54%	4,651	18.01%	373	1.44%
2024	20,988	81.57%	4,442	17.26%	300	1.17%

United States Senate election results for Auglaize County, Ohio1
Year	Republican		Democratic		Third party(ies)	
Year	No.	%	No.	%	No.	%
2024	19,363	76.02%	5,248	20.60%	861	3.38%

== Government ==
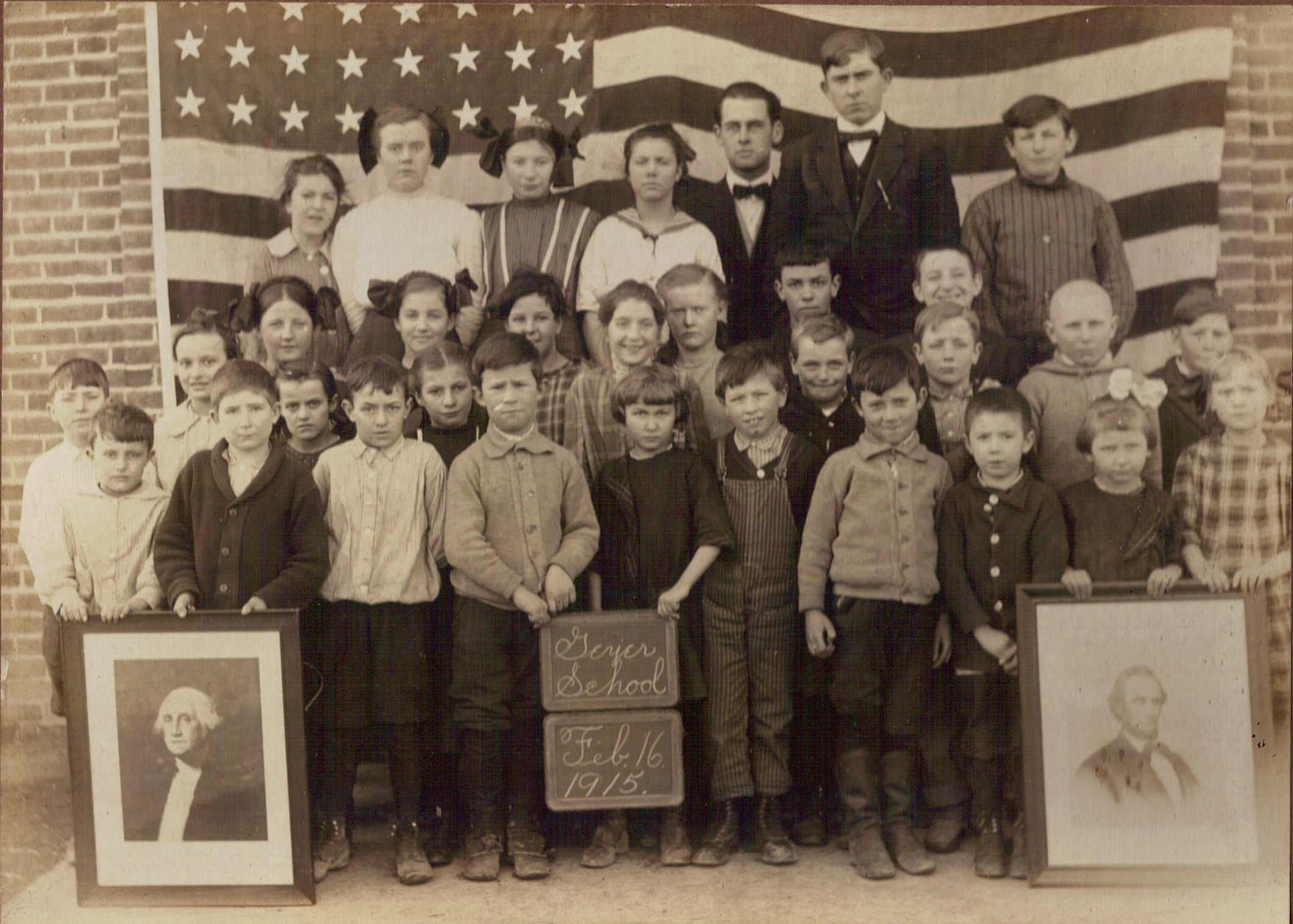
A 1915 class at Geyer School

Auglaize County is governed by an elected Board of Commissioners.

=== Courthouse ===
The county's first courthouse, built in 1851 for $11,499, was in use until 1894, when the current courthouse opened. Occupying an entire city block, the courthouse and its adjacent powerhouse cost $259,481. Some 85 men took 18 months to construct it, starting on July 2, 1893. Built of Berea sandstone with tile floors, the courthouse was highly fire-resistant. The boilers for heating and power generation, a significant cause of fire at the time, were in a separate powerhouse. Steam-driven dynamos produced the electricity that, along with steam for heating and hot water, was fed to the building via an underground conduit. The courthouse marked its centennial in 1994, and remains the seat of the county's courts, along with the much newer West Municipal Court in St. Marys.

== Economy ==
Auglaize County's economy is based on manufacturing. Employers with more than 400 employees are Crown Equipment Corporation, Joint Township District Memorial Hospital, the Minster Machine Company, Setex, Inc, AAP-St. Mary's Corporation (a division of Hitachi Metals), Veyance Technologies, Inc (Goodyear Tire and Rubber Company), and the Dannon Company.

== Communities ==
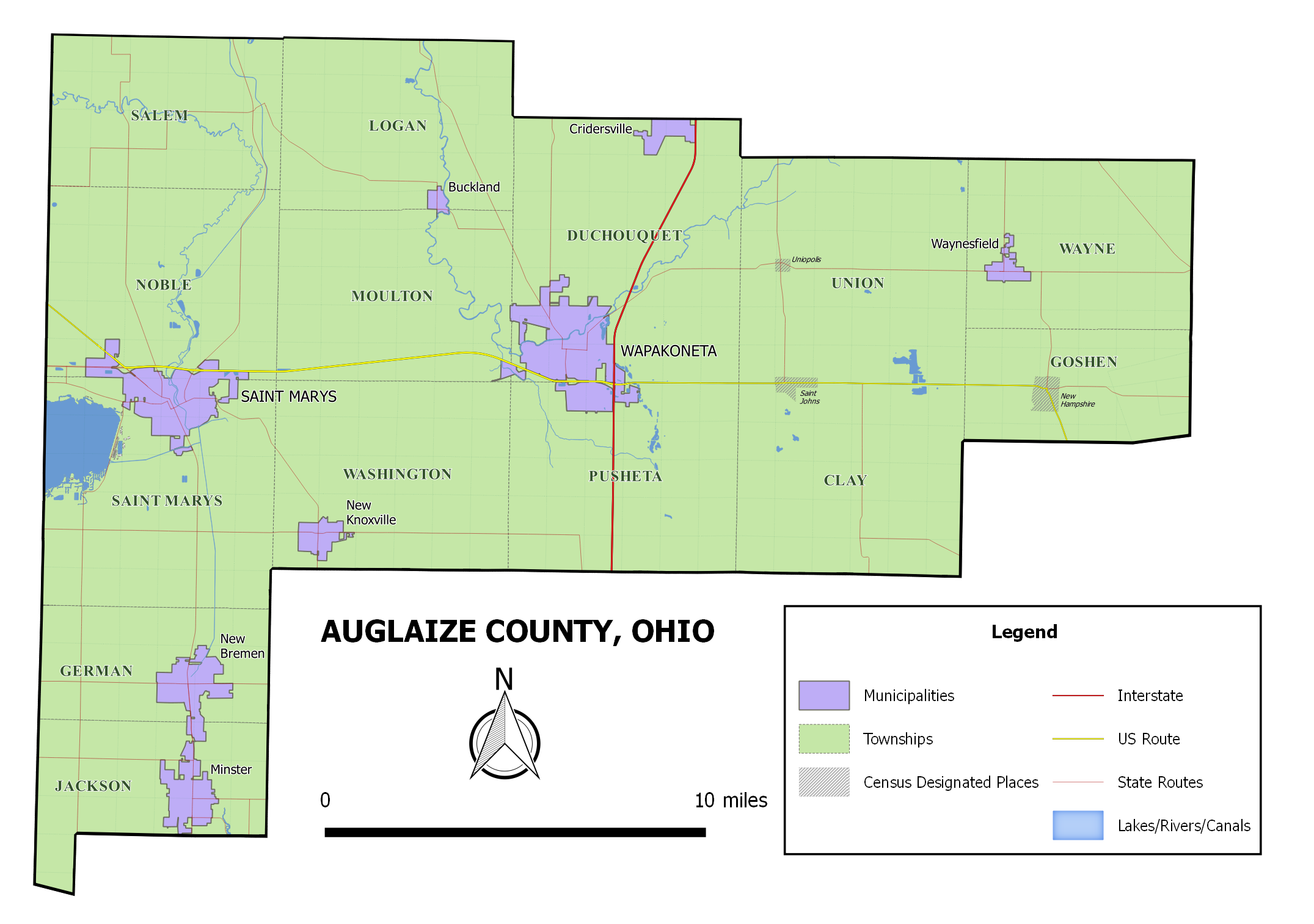

=== Cities ===
- Saint Marys
- Wapakoneta (county seat)

=== Villages ===
- Buckland
- Cridersville
- Minster (part)
- New Bremen
- New Knoxville
- Waynesfield

=== Townships ===
- Clay
- Duchouquet
- German
- Goshen
- Jackson
- Logan
- Moulton
- Noble
- Pusheta
- Saint Marys
- Salem
- Union
- Washington
- Wayne

=== Census-designated places ===
- New Hampshire
- Saint Johns
- Uniopolis

=== Unincorporated communities ===
- Bulkhead
- Egypt
- Fryburg
- Geyer
- Glynwood
- Gutman
- Holden
- Kossuth
- Lock Two
- Moulton
- Santa Fe
- Slater
- Villa Nova

== See also ==
- National Register of Historic Places listings in Auglaize County, Ohio
