= Minster Machine Company =

American metalworking equipment manufacturer

Nidec Minster
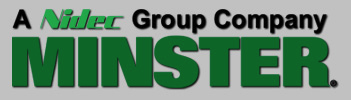
- Type: Publicly traded
- Industry: Manufacturing
- Founded: Minister, Ohio (1896)
- Founder: Anton Herkenhoff and Joseph Dues
- Headquarters: Minster, Ohio, United States
- Area served: Worldwide
- Key people: David Winch (CEO)
- Products: Industrial metalworking machinery and related services
- Revenue: ▲US$ 118 million (FY 2011)
- Number of employees: Approx. 500
- Parent: Nidec-Shimpo America Corporation
- Divisions: Midwest Manufacturing and Logistics
- Website: www.minster.com

The Minster Machine Company (Nidec Minster as of 2012) is an American manufacturer of machine presses and other metalworking equipment, and a provider of related services. The company is headquartered in Minster, Ohio. It operates as Nidec Minister Corporation, a subsidiary of Nidec-Shimpo America Corporation, a wholly owned subsidiary of Nidec Corporation.

== Overview ==
The Nidec Minster Corporation is a supplier of equipment and services for the material forming industry. Through its sister company—Midwest Manufacturing—Nidec Minster also offers contract manufacturing, including metal casting; pattern construction; welding and fabrication; precision and large-scale machining; assembly; logistics; and more. Minster currently has machinery operating in more than 81 countries of the world as well as having sales and regional service locations across the globe.

World Headquarters and manufacturing facilities for The Nidec Minster Corporation have been located in Minster, Ohio since the company's founding in 1896. Repair parts, service, and manufacturing support facilities are located in Ningbo, China and Halblech, Germany. Minster staffs Sales Offices in Japan, Belgium, Mexico, Spain, India, China and Brazil. Minster-employed and trained field service personnel are located strategically throughout the US and the world.

Nidec Minster Corporation in Minster, Ohio also serves as the world headquarters for Nidec Press & Automation, which includes Minster, Arisa, Kyori, Vamco, SYS and CHS press and manufacturing automation brands.

== History ==
Minster Machine Company's logo prior to its sale to Nidec-Shimpo

In 1896, Anton Herkenhoff and Joseph Dues founded the Dues and Herkenhoff Machine Works, a blacksmith shop. Soon, Dues sold his share of the business, and Herkenhoff renamed the enterprise The Minster Machine Company.

Oil drilling in the western Ohio area helped the company grow during its early years. One of its first products was the Fields Pumping Power, which allowed for drilling up to 30 wells simultaneously. The company then focused on building drill clutches.

Minster entered the metal stamping industry in 1926, and that became the company's main focus.

Minster expanded its facilities in the 1950s and around that time it introduced its die P2 Piece-Maker press. The product was refined over the years, and Minister introduced the quick die change Die-Namic Process in 1965, and the world's first totally automated "Stamping Center" in 1970.

In the mid 1970s, Minister opened a 75,000 square foot facility, just north of Minster's main plant.

Growth continued into the 1980s, and Minster opened a 40,000-square-foot manufacturing facility in Beaufort, South Carolina for the production of material handling equipment. Minster also introduced its ultra high speed Pulsar press line in 1980, with speeds of up to 2,000 strokes per minute.

In April 2012, The Minster Machine Company was purchased by the Nidec-Shimpo Corporation, which is part of the global network of the Nidec Corporation, headquartered in Kyoto, Japan.

In April 2012, the company was sold to Nidec-Shimpo America Corporation, a subsidiary of Nidec Corporation of Kyoto, Japan, and changed its name to Nidec Minster.

== Midwest Manufacturing and Logistics ==
Midwest Manufacturing and Logistics was previously a division of Nidec Minster Corporation, as an in-house foundry. They specialize in large precision component manufacturing. They serve customers in the machine tool, air compression, energy, HVAC, mining, diesel engine, material handling, and automotive industries in 82 countries around the world.

Midwest Manufacturing and Logistics was acquired by C.A. Lawton Co. in 2020.
