= Alexandersville, Ohio =

Coordinates: 39.6770°N 84.2388°W

Alexandersville, Ohio was a town located in Montgomery County, Ohio, United States, just north of West Carrollton and south of Moraine. It was incorporated into West Carrollton in 1943.

Alexandersville was platted in 1815 by John Taylor of Washington Township. A post office called Alexandersville was established in 1828, and remained in operation until 1907.
