= Miami and Erie Canal =

19th-century manmade water route between Cincinnati and Toledo, Ohio, U.S.

Coordinates: 39°06′03″N 84°29′49″W

- Region of Ohio
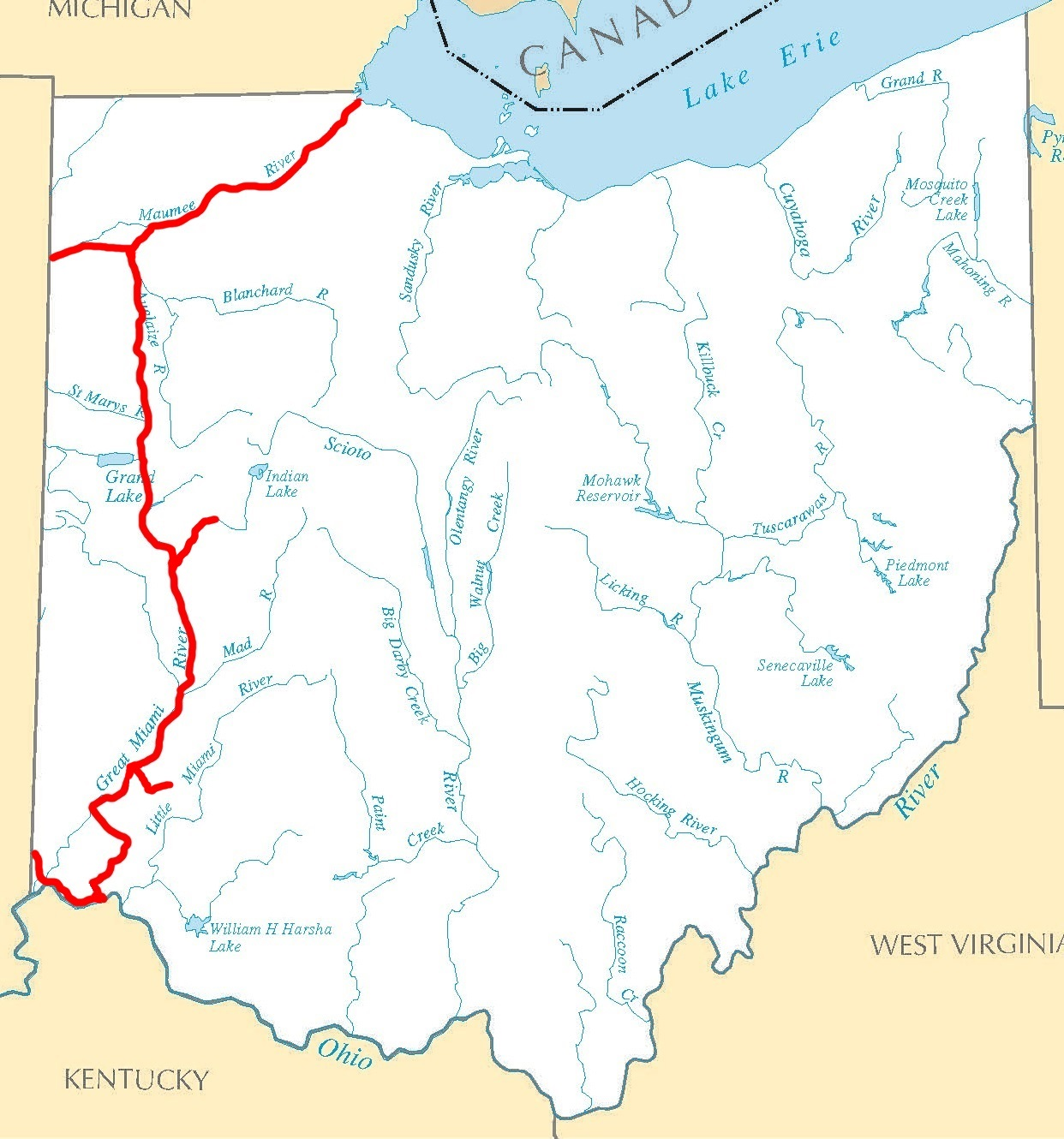
- Map of the Miami and Erie Canal
- Country: United States
- State: Ohio

The Miami and Erie Canal was a 274-mile (441 km) canal that ran from Cincinnati to Toledo, Ohio, creating a water route between the Ohio River and Lake Erie. Construction on the canal began in 1825 and was completed in 1845 at a cost to the state government of $8 million ($276 million in 2025). At its peak, it included 19 aqueducts, three guard locks, 103 canal locks, multiple feeder canals, and a few man-made water reservoirs. The canal climbed 395 feet (120 m) above Lake Erie and 513 feet (156 m) above the Ohio River to reach a topographical peak called the Loramie Summit, which extended 19 miles (31 km) between New Bremen, Ohio to lock 1-S in Lockington, north of Piqua, Ohio. Boats up to 80 feet long were towed along the canal by mules, horses, or oxen walking on a prepared towpath along the bank, at a rate of four to five miles per hour.

Because of competition from railroads, which began to be built in the area in the 1850s, the commercial use of the canal gradually declined during the late 19th century. It was permanently abandoned for commercial use in 1913 after a historic flood in Ohio severely damaged it. Only a small fraction of the canal survives today, along with its towpath and locks. The historically German-American Cincinnati neighborhood north of the canal called "Over the Rhine" got its name from immigrants who crossed the canal daily and nicknamed it after the river Rhine in Germany.

== History ==
When Ohio became a state in 1803, transportation to and within the state was difficult; settlers largely moved themselves and their goods on rivers and Lake Erie, for most roads were poor. In addition, Ohio was geographically separated from the East Coast by the barrier of the Appalachian Mountains. This made life difficult for early citizens because goods from the Atlantic Coast and Europe were difficult to obtain and often very expensive due to transportation costs. For the same reasons, it was difficult for Ohio businessmen and farmers to sell their products to markets outside the state. Some entrepreneurs began to ship goods from Ohio down the Ohio River to New Orleans, by sailing ship and keelboats, but the journey was long and costly. Even after steamboats arrived, it was difficult to return vessels upriver.

High shipping costs severely limited trade and population growth in the state, especially in areas far from natural waterways such as Lake Erie or the Ohio River, which bounded the state on the north and south, respectively.

To overcome these obstacles, many people, including George Washington and several other politicians, expressed early support for a national canal system to connect many of the country's waterways. In 1807, Senator Thomas Worthington of Ohio (who later became governor) asked the Secretary of the Treasury for funds to improve roads and build canals in Ohio, yet did not have much success. At the time, many prominent leaders in the Democratic Republican Party believed that such improvements should be built not by the national government but by the individual states. The United States Congress approved national canal legislation in 1817, 1822, and 1830, but each bill was vetoed by the sitting president.

Consequently, the burden of building canals passed to the states. The Erie Canal in New York proved to be an early success after it was completed in 1825. The Ohio House and Senate had worked for two decades to pass legislation authorizing a canal, gaining success with the Act of February 4, 1825, which finally approved the construction of the Ohio canal system. The canal was largely state-funded, using money acquired from selling off land near where the canals were to be dug. The state government planned and built two canals in the state: the Miami and Erie Canal, from Cincinnati to Toledo, connecting the Ohio River and Lake Erie; and the Ohio and Erie Canal, which connected Cleveland, another lake port, to Portsmouth, Ohio, on the Ohio River. This system provided the interior of Ohio with new travel routes that effectively extended to the major Atlantic port of New York City, as merchants could ship goods through Lake Erie, the Erie Canal, and the Hudson River to New York.

=== Construction ===
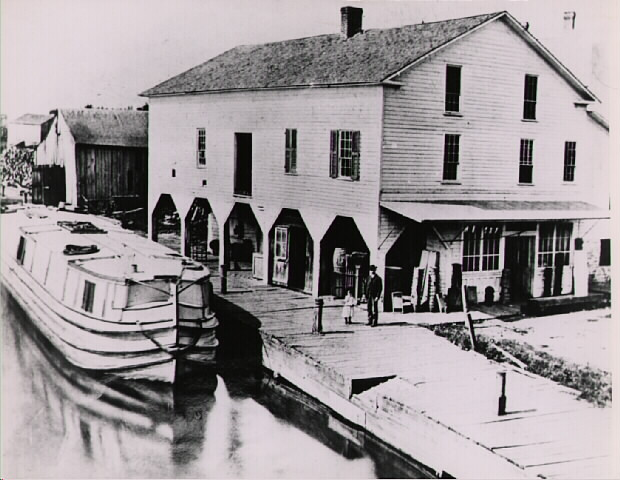
Miami and Erie Canal, at Rupps Store, Waterville, Ohio, 1888

Because Ohio is not entirely flat, the system of locks had to be designed to act as a staircase so boats could navigate the difference in elevation. To supply water for the canal, manmade reservoirs such as Grand Lake St. Marys and Lake Loramie in Shelby County were constructed, along with several feeder canals. Indian Lake in Logan County was greatly enlarged to provide a steadier supply of water for the Sidney feeder canal.

Branch canals were built to serve as extensions from the main canal. The Warren County Canal, was a branch canal constructed from the Miami and Erie Canal at Middletown to Lebanon. This branch was opened in 1840, but remained in operation less than 15 years before being abandoned. A short branch, the Sidney or Port Jefferson feeder canal ran up the Miami Valley from Lockington through Sidney to a dam just upstream from Port Jefferson.

The following list includes measurement standards for the canal, although these varied by region of the state.

- 4 ft (1.2 m) water depth.
- 40 ft (12 m) wide at water level.
- 10 ft (3.0 m) wide towpath in addition to mandated outer slopes.
- All slopes are 4.5 ft (1.4 m) horizontal to 4 ft (1.2 m). perpendicular.
- The canal could accommodate boats up to 90 ft (27 m) long and 14 ft (4.3 m) wide.

=== Decline and abandonment ===
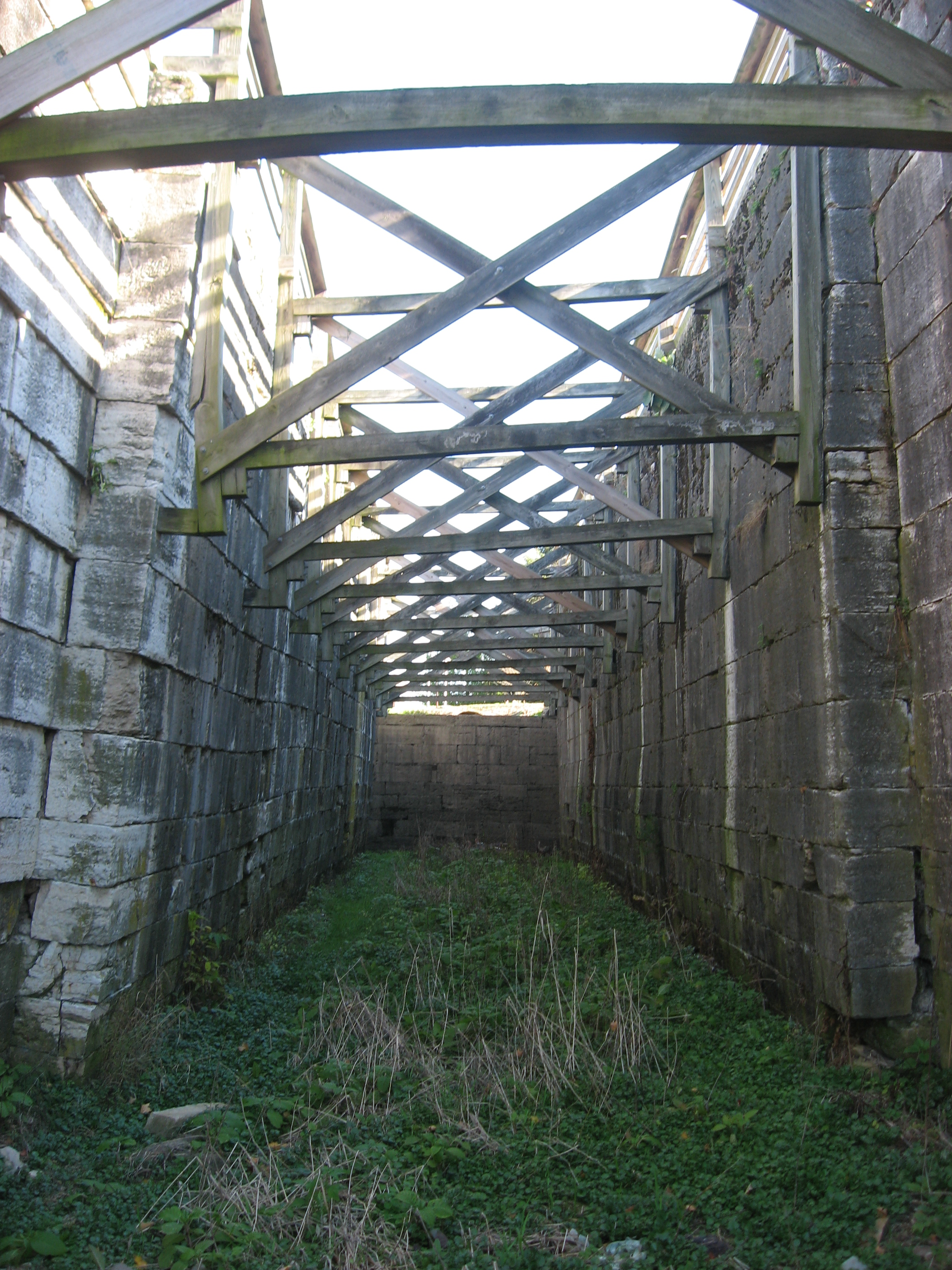
Interior of one of the Lockington Locks. Braces have been installed to prevent the lock from caving in

The Miami and Erie never proved to be as profitable as the state government had hoped, as within several years of being completed to Lake Erie it had to compete with railroads. These offered greater speed and capacity for both passengers and goods. Factors limiting the canal's success included the lower population and level of economic development in Ohio, compared to that of New York when its canal was completed. Second, while New York had one canal that was located at the bottleneck of Great Lakes trade, Ohio had two canals, which spread usage too thinly. Third, was the expense of building and maintaining the canals. While the Erie Canal was 363 miles in length, with an elevation change of 700 feet, the combined length of Ohio's canals was 557 miles, with an elevation change of 2,096 feet. Compared to operations of the Erie Canal, the Ohio canal system had less trade and fewer passengers, while it had to operate over a longer length, and at a greater expense.

The canal was completed just before most of the railroads in Ohio were built, and it had to compete directly with railroads for the remainder of its operation. Due to the canal freezing over in the winter, as well as the slowness of the boats, the canal was less practical than railroads, especially for perishable goods and passenger traffic. Although the canal services were often cheaper than the railroads, particularly for bulk cargoes such as grain and salted pork, the canal had largely ceased to operate by 1906. The catastrophic Great Dayton Flood of 1913 and the subsequent flood control measures constructed by the Miami Conservancy District destroyed much of the canal infrastructure along the southern portion of the route, where it paralleled the Great Miami River. The canal was permanently abandoned. What was not destroyed was no longer maintained, and slowly many of the remaining locks and sections of canal were destroyed, with the open canal filled in.

Much of the original towpath was redeveloped as the right-of-way for the Cincinnati and Lake Erie Railroad, an electric interurban streetcar that operated until 1938. Part of the right-of-way was converted to the Wright-Lockland Highway (now part of Interstate 75). From 1920 to 1925, six million dollars was spent to use the bed of the canal to build a downtown subway in Cincinnati. The surface was later paved over to form Central Parkway, as funds ran out before the Cincinnati Subway could be completed. In the central and northern regions, a large portion of the canal was destroyed when it was filled in to create parts of I-75, U.S. Route 24, and State Route 25. Some smaller portions of right-of-way have been converted to bike trails for recreational and local commuting use.

=== Legacy ===
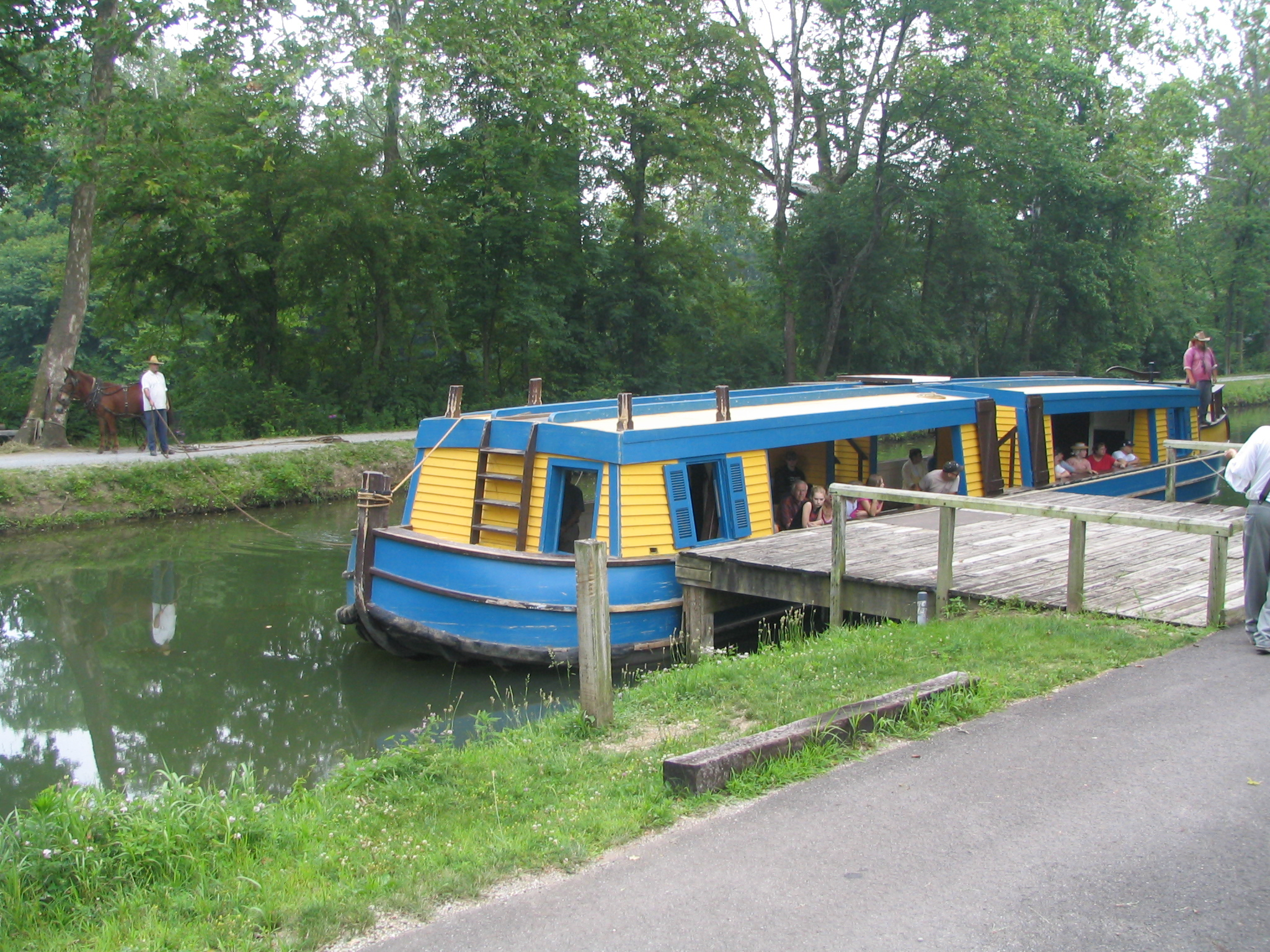
Barge General Harrison of Piqua on the canal in the Piqua, Ohio, Historical Area, in July 2006. Note the captain steering the canal boat and the towing mule on the towpath on the far side. The canal is wide enough to permit two barges to pass.

Although urban development has destroyed most vestiges of the canal, some locks and sections of the waterway have survived. One of the original locks (#17) is located in the Carillon Historical Park in Dayton. An unrestored but complete lock (#15) is located just off Main Street (State Route 571) in Tipp City. Remains of the Excello lock are located in the Butler County Excello Locks Park near the intersection of State Route 73 and South Hamilton Middletown Road in Lemon Township. The massive west abutment of the Old Nine-mile Aqueduct over the Great Miami River is still present approximately 400 ft (120 m) upstream of the Taylorsville Dam east of Vandalia (Montgomery County). The abutment terminates a fairly intact canal segment that extends at least 5 mi (8.0 km) north to Tipp City. This segment includes an intact concrete weir near the abandoned Vandalia water treatment plant (aka "Tadmore Station") and a ruined lock (#16, "Picayune") about halfway to Tipp City along Canal Road.

On the canal's southern end, a drained section is located in St. Bernard, Ohio's Ludlow Park, where the canal bed is still visible. The canal remains in water (and navigable for canoes or kayaks) in the rural region between Delphos and St. Marys, Ohio. South of St. Mary's, it has degraded to form a shallow ditch in most places, with some ruined locks remaining. From north to south along State Route 66, sections of the original canal are visible in Delphos, at a small historic park located at the Deep Cut in Spencerville, Lock Two (a hamlet mostly consisting of period brick buildings), New Bremen, Minster, Fort Loramie, and Piqua. The Miami and Erie Canal Deep Cut was designated in 1964 as a U.S. National Historic Landmark near Spencerville. The Piqua Historical Area features a replica canal boat and other related items.

Anthony Wayne Trail (part of U.S. Route 24 and State Route 25) in and around Toledo, originally named Canal Boulevard, was built on the canal right-of-way, and various relics of the canal survive along the corridor.

Much of the canal corridor continues as a prosperous manufacturing area; today Interstate 75 and railroads provide the chief transportation means. An historical reenactment of the Miami-Erie canal days is held during summer and early fall months at Providence Metropark along the Maumee River just west of Toledo near Grand Rapids. Historical actors dress and act as if it is 1876 during the months of May–October. Two mules pull the canal boat titled The Volunteer, while workers man the tiller and provide commentary to the passengers. Providence Metroparks boasts using original lock 44 as part of the tour. That lock is the only working lock in the state of Ohio. The northern portion of the towpath (from Fort Loramie to Delphos and beyond) is used as a hiking trail.

=== "Over the Rhine" ===
The historically German-American neighborhood in Cincinnati north of the canal is known as "Over the Rhine", based on a local nickname of the canal after the river Rhine in Germany. traveler Ferenc Pulszky wrote in his 1853 book White, Red, Black, in which wrote, "The Germans live all together across the Miami Canal, which is, therefore, here jocosely called the 'Rhine.' " In 1875 writer Daniel J. Kenny noted, "Germans and Americans alike love to call the district 'Over the Rhine.' "

== Cities and towns along the canal ==
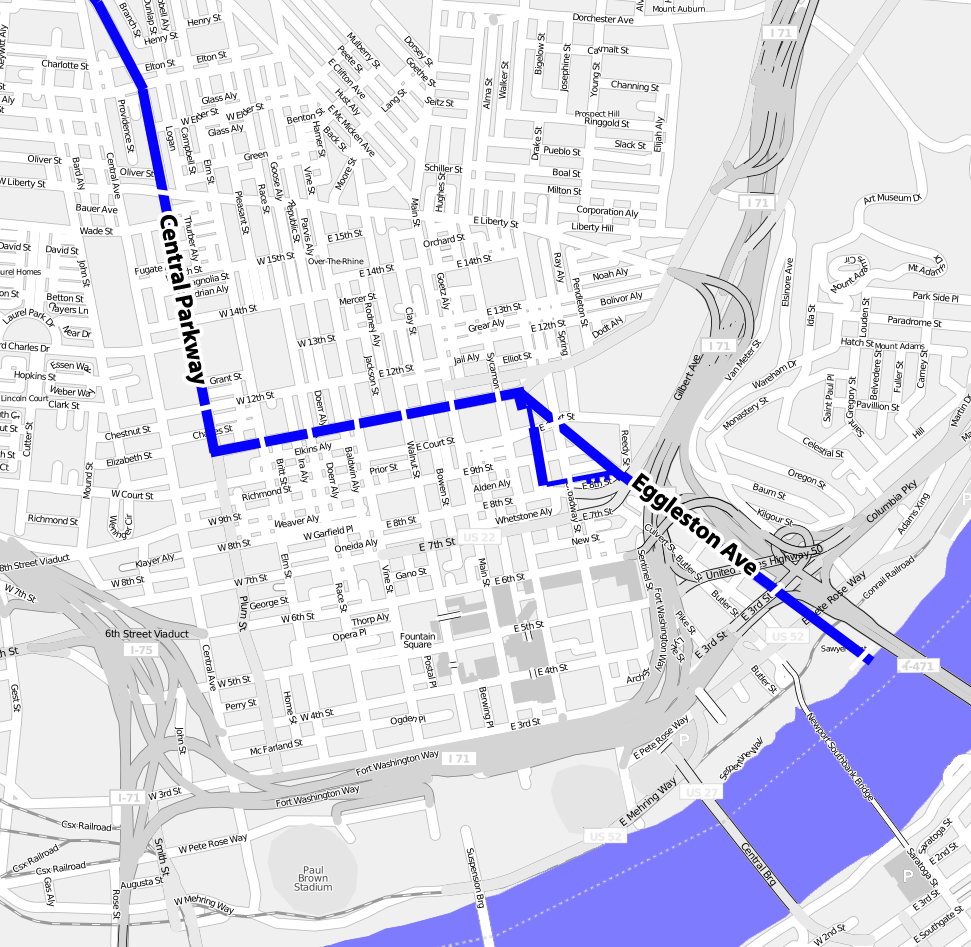
Former location of the canal in downtown Cincinnati.

The following is a list of towns and cities within Ohio (arranged North to South) along the Miami and Erie Canal. The canal was constructed parallel to the Maumee River to Defiance, from where it was constructed in a southerly route to Cincinnati.

- Toledo, Ohio
- Maumee, Ohio
- Waterville, Ohio
- Providence, Ohio (defunct city across the Maumee River from Grand Rapids, Ohio)
- Napoleon, Ohio
- Florida, Ohio
- Defiance, Ohio The canal turns here in a southerly route to Cincinnati.
- Junction, Ohio
- Melrose, Ohio
- Ottoville, Ohio
- Delphos, Ohio
- Spencerville, Ohio
- Kossuth, Ohio
- St. Marys, Ohio
- New Bremen, Ohio
- Minster, Ohio
- Fort Loramie, Ohio
- Port Jefferson, Ohio (North end of the Sidney Feeder)
- Sidney, Ohio (Middle section of the feeder)
- Lockington, Ohio (Southern end junction of the Sidney Feeder)
- Piqua, Ohio
- Troy, Ohio
- Tipp City, Ohio
- Huber Heights, Ohio
- Dayton, Ohio
- Moraine, Ohio
- Alexandersville, Ohio
- West Carrollton, Ohio
- Miamisburg, Ohio
- Franklin, Ohio
- Middletown, Ohio
- Hamilton, Ohio
- West Chester, Ohio
- Sharonville, Ohio
- Evendale, Ohio
- Lockland, Ohio (Site of the first set of locks)
- Elmwood Place, Ohio
- St. Bernard, Ohio
- Cincinnati, Ohio
