= Minster, Ohio =

- Village
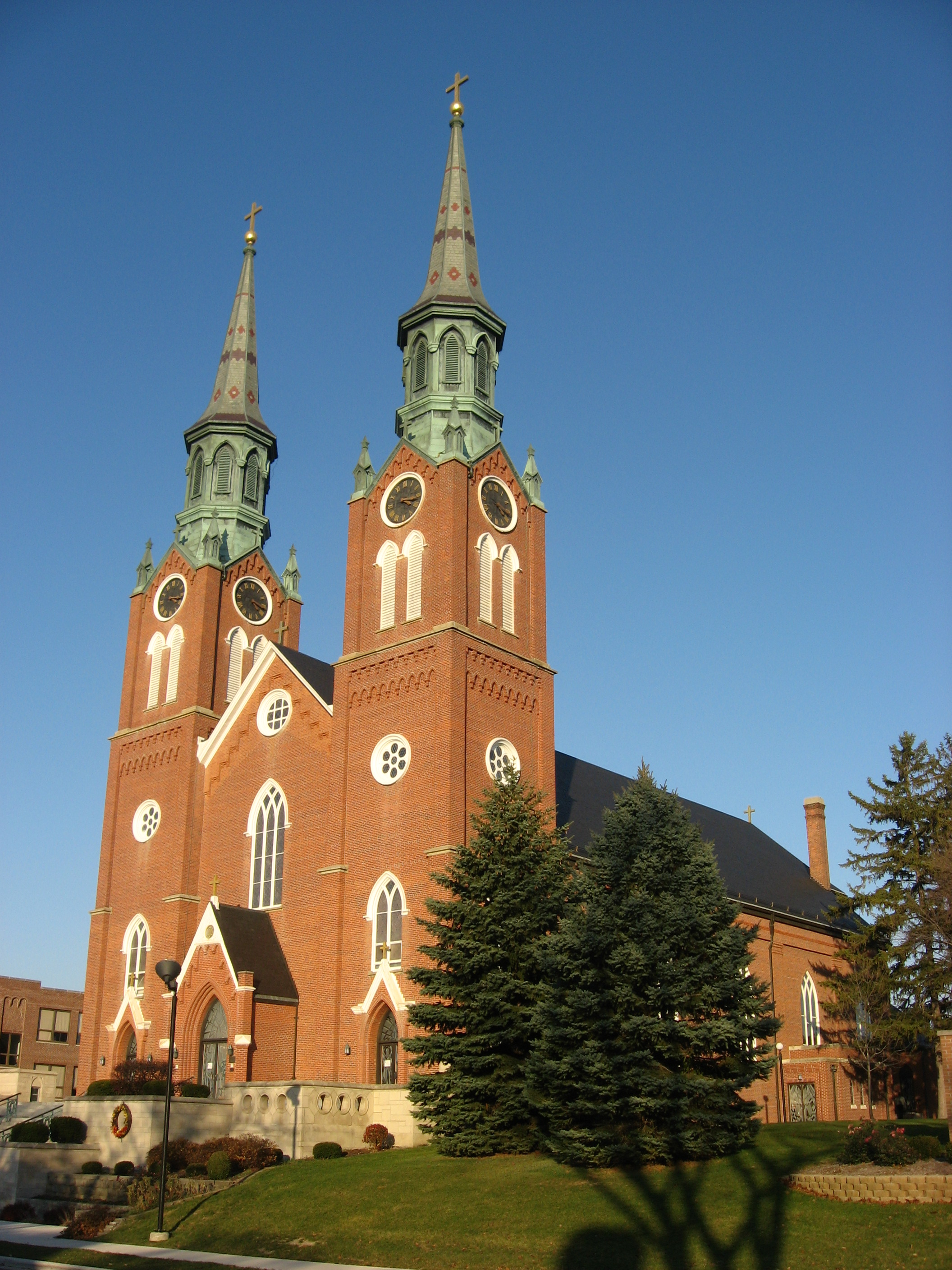
- St. Augustine Catholic Church in Minster

- Flag Logo
- Motto: "A Great Community"
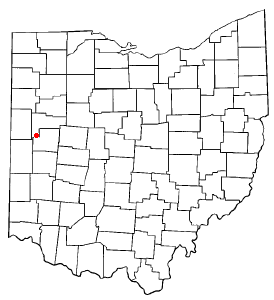
- Location of Minster, Ohio

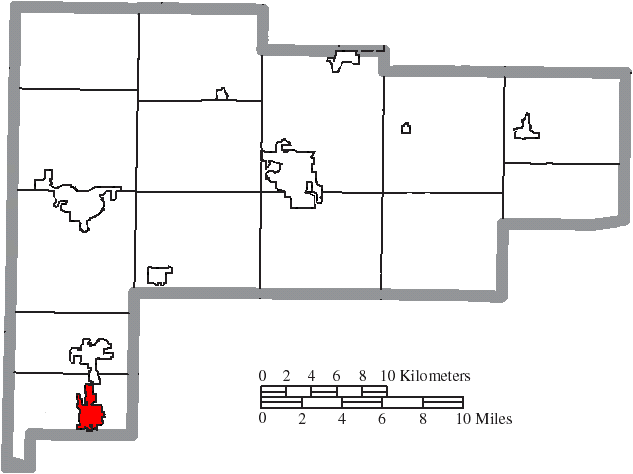
- Location of Minster in Auglaize County
- Coordinates: 40°23′38″N 84°22′34″W
- Country: United States
- State: Ohio
- County: Auglaize, Shelby
- Townships: Jackson, McLean

Government
  - Mayor: Craig Oldiges

Area
  - Total: 2.11 sq mi (5.47 km^{2})
  - Land: 2.11 sq mi (5.47 km^{2})
  - Water: 0 sq mi (0.00 km^{2})
- Elevation: 968 ft (295 m)

Population (2020)
  - Total: 3,046
  - Density: 1,442.2/sq mi (556.85/km^{2})
- Time zone: UTC-5 (Eastern (EST))
  - Summer (DST): UTC-4 (EDT)
- ZIP code: 45865
- Area code: 419
- FIPS code: 39-50918
- GNIS feature ID: 2399377
- Website: www.minsteroh.com

Minster is a village in Auglaize and Shelby counties, in the U.S. state of Ohio. The population was 3,046 at the 2020 census. It is included in the Wapakoneta, Ohio Micropolitan Statistical Area. It is adjacent to the village of New Bremen to the north.

Minster is the home of one of the world's largest yogurt plants, operated by Dannon, which employs more than 400 people. The Minster Machine Company is also headquartered in Minster.

== History ==
Founded in 1832 as Stallostown (for its founder Francis J. Stallo), the village changed its name to Minster in 1836 (after the heavily Roman Catholic region of Münster in Westphalia, from which many of the settlers came). Minster was founded as part of Mercer County, but it was given to Auglaize County when it was created in 1848. It was mostly comprised from the beginning by German settlers coming from Cincinnati by way of the Miami-Erie Canal bringing their farming skills and Catholic faith with them.

One of the early benefits of locating in Minster was the Miami-Erie Canal, which was expected to decrease transportation costs for agricultural produce and finished goods. Located between Cleveland Street and Frankfort Street, the canal and footpaths on either side are still visible reminders. Located southeast of Minster, the Loramie Creek was expanded for use by the canal system as Lake Loramie reservoir about 1847. In 1949 its management was transferred to the Ohio DNR. Lake Loramie State Park offers fishing, boating, camping and cabins.

The canals of Ohio were overshadowed by the efficiency of railroads. A branch line was completed through Minster around 1878, connecting to the north with St. Marys and the Lake Erie and Western Railroad mainline. In 1922 the Nickel Plate Road gained control. The branch line served as a freight and passenger route until its decline, with final passenger service in the 1930s when automobiles became preferred. The branch line continued to be a profitable nine-mile stretch serving local industries, active until around the late 1960s when a weak bridge halted service and modern semi-trucks became the lower-cost freight method.

Most of the roads in Minster were originally named after places in Germany and surrounding areas. For example, Webster Street was known as Berlin Street, Hamilton Street was known as Vienna Street and Jefferson Street was known as Oldenburg Street. The early American patriots' surnames were added around 1920, largely due to patriotic sentiment during World War I, while some German street names like Hanover Street and Frankfort Street (named after Frankfurt an der Oder or Frankfurt am Main) remained.

Since 1975, the yearly Oktoberfest celebrates Minster's German roots, decades of history, and community spirit.

== Geography ==
According to the United States Census Bureau, the village has a total area of 1.93 square miles (5.00 km^{2}), all land.

== Demographics ==
Historical population
Census	Pop.	Note	%±
1850	428		—
1860	752		75.7%
1870	868		15.4%
1880	1,123		29.4%
1890	1,126		0.3%
1900	1,465		30.1%
1910	1,583		8.1%
1920	1,538		−2.8%
1930	1,381		−10.2%
1940	1,504		8.9%
1950	1,728		14.9%
1960	2,193		26.9%
1970	2,405		9.7%
1980	2,557		6.3%
1990	2,650		3.6%
2000	2,794		5.4%
2010	2,805		0.4%
2020	3,046		8.6%
U.S. Decennial Census

=== 2020 census ===
As of the 2020 census, Minster had a population of 3,046. The median age was 37.5 years. 27.2% of residents were under the age of 18 and 18.1% of residents were 65 years of age or older. For every 100 females there were 99.3 males, and for every 100 females age 18 and over there were 96.7 males age 18 and over.

100.0% of residents lived in urban areas, while 0.0% lived in rural areas.

There were 1,116 households in Minster, of which 34.9% had children under the age of 18 living in them. Of all households, 62.8% were married-couple households, 16.1% were households with a male householder and no spouse or partner present, and 17.8% were households with a female householder and no spouse or partner present. About 26.3% of all households were made up of individuals and 13.8% had someone living alone who was 65 years of age or older.

There were 1,158 housing units, of which 3.6% were vacant. The homeowner vacancy rate was 0.6% and the rental vacancy rate was 3.9%.

Racial composition as of the 2020 census
Race	Number	Percent
White	2,949	96.8%
Black or African American	1	0.0%
American Indian and Alaska Native	1	0.0%
Asian	19	0.6%
Native Hawaiian and Other Pacific Islander	1	0.0%
Some other race	22	0.7%
Two or more races	53	1.7%
Hispanic or Latino (of any race)	40	1.3%

=== 2010 census ===
As of the census of 2010, there were 2,805 people, 1,045 households, and 741 families living in the village. The population density was 1,453.4 inhabitants per square mile (561.2/km^{2}). There were 1,136 housing units at an average density of 588.6 per square mile (227.3/km^{2}). The racial makeup of the village was 99.3% White, 0.1% Asian, 0.1% Pacific Islander, and 0.4% from two or more races. Hispanic or Latino of any race were 0.7% of the population.

There were 1,045 households, of which 34.1% had children under the age of 18 living with them, 63.2% were married couples living together, 4.8% had a female householder with no husband present, 3.0% had a male householder with no wife present, and 29.1% were non-families. 25.8% of all households were made up of individuals, and 12% had someone living alone who was 65 years of age or older. The average household size was 2.60 and the average family size was 3.18.

The median age in the village was 39.9 years. 28.9% of residents were under the age of 18; 4.5% were between the ages of 18 and 24; 22.3% were from 25 to 44; 27.2% were from 45 to 64; and 16.9% were 65 years of age or older. The gender makeup of the village was 49.7% male and 50.3% female.

=== 2000 census ===
As of the census of 2000, there were 2,794 people, 999 households, and 748 families living in the village. The population density was 1,488.1 inhabitants per square mile (574.6/km^{2}). There were 1,033 housing units at an average density of 550.2 per square mile (212.4/km^{2}). The racial makeup of the village was 99.68% White, 0.07% Native American, 0.07% Asian, and 0.18% from two or more races. Hispanic or Latino of any race were 0.11% of the population.

There were 999 households, out of which 36.3% had children under the age of 18 living with them, 67.7% were married couples living together, 4.6% had a female householder with no husband present, and 25.1% were non-families. 23.7% of all households were made up of individuals, and 11.4% had someone living alone who was 65 years of age or older. The average household size was 2.69 and the average family size was 3.22.

In the village, the population was spread out, with 29.0% under the age of 18, 6.5% from 18 to 24, 27.3% from 25 to 44, 19.4% from 45 to 64, and 17.8% who were 65 years of age or older. The median age was 37 years. For every 100 females there were 94.7 males. For every 100 females age 18 and over, there were 90.3 males.

The median income for a household in the village was $57,315, and the median income for a family was $66,176. Males had a median income of $49,215 versus $27,826 for females. The per capita income for the village was $22,149. About 4.2% of families and 3.6% of the population were below the poverty line, including 0.4% of those under age 18 and 13.3% of those age 65 or over.

== Religion ==
The local St. Augustine's Church is a prominent community landmark. The historic Roman Catholic Convent of the Sisters of the Precious Blood, Spiritual Center and Shrine of the Holy Relics is also located in nearby Maria Stein in neighboring Mercer County. The Catholic radio network Radio Maria USA operates Anna-licensed station WHJM with a local studio in Minster.

== Education ==
Minster has a public library, a branch of the Auglaize County Public Library. Minster High School is located in the village.

== Notable people ==
- John Joseph Enneking, American landscape painter
- Mary Froning, American baseball player (AAGPBL)
- Katie Horstman, American baseball player (AAGPBL)
- Eli Wolf, former NFL tight end for the Baltimore Ravens
