= K. C. Pillai =

K. C. Pillai may refer to:

- K. C. Pillai (bishop)
- K C Pillai (politician)
- K. C. Sreedharan Pillai, Indian statistician
