= Victor Paul Wierwille =

American evangelical (1916–1985)

- V.P. Wierwille (1916-1985)
- Born: December 31, 1916; New Knoxville, Ohio, U.S.
- Died: May 20, 1985 (aged 68); New Knoxville, Ohio
- Resting place: New Knoxville, Ohio
- Education: Mission House College; Princeton Theological Seminary
- Known for: The Way International

Victor Paul Wierwille (December 31, 1916 – May 20, 1985) was an American evangelical writer and the founder of The Way International (TWI).

== Biography ==
Victor Paul Wierwille was born on December 31, 1916, in New Knoxville, Ohio, to Ernst Henry Wierwille and Emma Sophia Niemeyer.

He was raised in and later ordained by the Evangelical and Reformed Church (a predecessor of the United Church of Christ) in 1941, and he officially left that church in 1957. Wierwille graduated from Mission House College with Bachelor of Arts and Bachelor of Theology degrees. He then studied at The University of Chicago Divinity School and received a Master of Theology in practical theology from Princeton Theological Seminary. Wierwille later studied at Pikes Peak Bible Seminary, a non-accredited institution, and received a doctorate in theology.

In October 1942, he started the precursor to The Way International (a nontrinitarian Christian organization), Vesper Chimes, which was a radio show broadcast from Lima, Ohio, incorporating in 1947 as The Chimes Hour Youth Caravan. He incorporated as The Way Incorporated in 1955, maintaining that this was the name that early Christians used for themselves basing his assertion on several uses of "the way" or "this way" in Acts of the Apostles. Later the official name became The Way International.

Wierwille authored several books that are printed by The Way International's American Christian Press publishing organization. One book was Jesus Christ is Not God, in which he addressed his belief that Jesus Christ is the only begotten Son of God and Messiah but not a persona of the Christian God. Wierwille wrote three other works which focused on Jesus Christ and the concept of the Holy Spirit: Jesus Christ Our Passover, Jesus Christ Our Promised Seed, and Receiving the Holy Spirit Today. Other major works include Power for Abundant Living, Christians Should Be Prosperous, Are the Dead Alive Now? and his Studies in Abundant Living five-volume series.

Wierwille became associated in 1957 with Aramaic Bible scholar George Lamsa, who finished his translation work for the Lamsa Bible in Wierwille's home. Lamsa and Wierwille together produced the first American Aramaic grammar in 1960 for the study of Biblical manuscripts with the classical Estrangelo letters. Believing the original New Testament was written in Aramaic, Wierwille was a supporter of Lamsa's translation of the Bible and used it frequently.

On February 2, 1961, he moved The Way International headquarters to New Knoxville, Ohio, on approximately 147 acres (59 ha) of family farm land.

After graduating from B. G. Leonard's Gifts of the Spirit class in Calgary, Alberta, Wierwille began teaching a similar class that he initially called Receiving the Holy Spirit Today but soon changed to Power for Abundant Living (PFAL). Eventually he expanded it into a teaching series, including a foundational, intermediate, and advanced class. Wierwille was the president of The Way International from its incorporation until he retired from leadership in October 1982. He was followed by his hand-picked successor, L. Craig Martindale. Martindale was a former Baptist Student Union and Fellowship of Christian Athletes leader at the University of Kansas, where he played football in the early 1970s.

After his retirement, Wierwille’s health deteriorated rapidly. He died of cancer of the liver and ocular cancer on May 20, 1985, at the age of 68.

== Selected bibliography ==
- (1971) Power for Abundant Living (1st Ed). ISBN 0-910068-01-1
- (1971) Christians Should Be Prosperous (1st Ed). ISBN 0-910068-65-8
- (1957) Receiving the Holy Spirit Today (1st Ed)
- (1972) Receiving the Holy Spirit Today (7th Ed). ISBN 0-910068-49-6
- (1975) Jesus Christ is Not God (2nd Ed). ISBN 0-910068-33-X
- (1980) Jesus Christ Our Passover (2nd Ed). ISBN 0-910068-30-5
- (1982) Jesus Christ Our Promised Seed (1st Ed). ISBN 0-910068-42-9
- (1982) Are the Dead Alive Now? (2nd Ed). ISBN 0-910068-40-2
- (1971) Studies in Abundant Living Series Volume I - The Bible Tells Me So (1st Ed). ISBN 0-910068-10-0
- (1971) Studies in Abundant Living Series Volume II - The New Dynamic Church (1st Ed). ISBN 0-910068-11-9
- (1971) Studies in Abundant Living Series Volume III - The Words Way (1st Ed). ISBN 0-910068-12-7
- (1977) Studies in Abundant Living Series Volume IV - God's Magnified Word (1st Ed). ISBN 0-910068-13-5
- (1985) Studies in Abundant Living Series Volume V - Order My Steps in Thy Word (1st Ed). ISBN 0-910068-59-3
