= AXV =

AXV may refer to:

- Neil Armstrong Airport, in Wakaponeta, Ohio, United States (IATA code AXV)
- Advanced eXperimental Vehicle, a Toyota concept vehicle
- VT-AXV, a plane involved in the Air India Express Flight 812 accident
