= KAXV =

KAXV may refer to:

- KAXV (FM), an American Family Radio affiliate (91.9 FM) licensed to serve Bastrop, Louisiana
- Neil Armstrong Airport in Wapakoneta, Ohio, United States, which is assigned ICAO code KAXV
