= The Way International =

Christian organization based in New Knoxville, Ohio, US

- Founder: Victor Paul Wierwille
- Purpose: Biblical research, teaching, and fellowship
- Location: New Knoxville, Ohio, U.S.
- Origins: October 3, 1942 as Vesper Chimes radio program
- Region served: Worldwide
- Key people: Rev. Vern Edwards, Director; Rev. Steve Crommett, Director; Rev. Bill Greene, Director; Dr. Angela Priester, Director; Rev. Mel Privette, Director
- Website: Official website

The Way International is a nontrinitarian Christian organization based in New Knoxville, Ohio. The followers congregate primarily in home fellowships located throughout the United States, two US territories, and in over 30 countries. It was founded by Victor Paul Wierwille in 1942 as a radio program, subsequently becoming The Chimes Hour Youth Caravan in 1947, and The Way, Inc., in 1955.

The ministry distributes publications such as The Way Magazine through its company, American Christian Press, and has developed and promotes classes and other programs, some of which are in several languages. It formed The Way Corps, a leadership training program, in 1970.

The Way offers classes in biblical studies to its followers, prominently the Power for Abundant Living Today (also referred to as PFAL Today) class series, considered to be the modern-day successor to its original class series, Power for Abundant Living (also referred to as PFAL). The Way International has given focused attention on first-century Christianity and extensive research into the Church Epistles. It has been described as combining biblical literalism, evangelicalism, Calvinism, dispensationalism, and Pentecostalism. The teaching of The Way International (TWI) is based on 2 Peter 1:20 that "no prophecy of the scripture is of any private interpretation" (KJV translation) and they believe the Bible interprets itself in a variety of ways that are taught in its studies, classes, and publications. According to their website, TWI teaches that every follower can have an accurate understanding of God's original intent in his Word.

On October 3, 1982, L. Craig Martindale became the second president of The Way. He was followed by Rosalie F. Rivenbark in April 2000. In March 2017, Jean-Yves DeLisle was installed as the fourth president. On March 10, 2020, Vernon W. Edwards was installed as the fifth president of The Way.

== History ==
=== Victor Paul Wierwille ===
Dr. Victor Paul Wierwille was born on December 31, 1916. Wierwille was deeply interested in Christianity from a young age, and attended Mission House College and Seminary, Moody Bible Institute, as well as the University of Chicago Divinity School. He later received a Master of Theology degree from Princeton Theological Seminary and a doctorate from Pikes Peak Bible Seminary.

Wierwille was ordained as a minister in the Evangelical and Reformed Church (now part of the United Church of Christ). He maintained he had recovered the true apostolic understanding of Christianity that had been lost to the church. He later claimed God spoke to him personally, telling him he would teach him "the Word as it had not been known since the first century", so that he could pass it on to others.

=== Radio ministry ===
On October 3, 1942, Wierwille began a weekly live radio program dubbed Vesper Chimes, recruiting a group of young people from local churches to help him. The program was broadcast from WLOK in Lima, Ohio, where the youth would sing and perform alongside Wierwille's sermons that included "principles for abundant life". Soon afterwards, the program was renamed The Chimes Hour Youth Caravan. Wierwille published his first book, Victory Through Christ, in 1945, compiling his radio sermons. In 1947, The Chimes Hour Youth Caravan incorporated with Wierwille as president alongside a board of directors.

That year, The Way: The Chimes Hour Young People's Publication began publishing writings by people associated with the radio program each month. Starting in 1948, Wierwille began broadcasting every morning in addition to the regular weekly program. Nearly ten years following the first broadcast, The Van Wert Gospel Gift Shop and Multigraph Printing and Publishing Co. opened for business and released the first issue of The Way Magazine. The Chimes Hour Youth Caravan, broadcast over radio station WLW in Cincinnati, continued to have radio and public performances until April 1953, at which time the Nielsen ratings showed that 70,000 homes were tuned in on Sundays. Wierwille continued to broadcast his meditations over WIMA in Lima, WONW in Defiance, and WRFD in Worthington, Ohio, until 1955.

=== The Way ===
In 1953, Wierwille started teaching the course that would later become Power for Abundant Living. It was held in Van Wert, Ohio. It expanded to other locations in Ohio and eventually to other states. Four years later, he resigned from the Evangelical and Reformed Church pastorate to devote his time to The Way ministry.

Moving to his family's farm in New Knoxville, Ohio, in 1959, he established the location as the headquarters for The Way's Institute for Biblical Research and Teaching, later The Way Inc. The Way's followers grew significantly in the late 1960s and early 1970s. In January 1968, Wierwille visited San Francisco to personally witness the Jesus People street ministries, such as those in Haight-Ashbury, where he himself ministered. Some of the groups he met later incorporated as The Way East (based in Rye, New York) and The Way West (based in Mill Valley, California), groups that utilized Wierwille's PFAL class in their ministries. Wierwille had many join him on his trip, marking a period of large growth for his ministry. Wierwille later merged The Way East and The Way West into The Way Inc., now the Way International.

==== Leadership changes ====
In 1982, during the ministry's 40th anniversary celebration, Wierwille installed L. Craig Martindale as president and accepted the title Founding President.

In 2000, Martindale's term as president ended and Rosalie F. Rivenbark replaced him. The governing board, originally called the board of trustees, but now called the board of directors, consisted of three to five directors, with Rivenbark as chairman.

In January 2017, Rivenbark stepped down from the presidency but retained her position as chairman of the board of directors. Jean Yves DeLisle was installed as the fourth president.

On March 10, 2020, Vern Edwards was installed as the fifth president

On June 16, 2020, Rivenbark stepped down as chairman, and the board of directors was reduced to three members: Edwards, Bill Greene, and John Rupp.

== Structure ==
=== Organization ===
Main entrance to the Prevailing Word Auditorium, a 1,400-seat Teaching Center which holds Sunday teaching services, conferences and performances.

The Way International headquarters is located in New Knoxville, Ohio. The organization also owns and operate Camp Gunnison—The Way Family Ranch in Gunnison, Colorado. The Way is organized into Regions, States, and Branches, with each Branch consisting of two or more home fellowships. The Way focuses on these fellowships as a basic organizational unit. Meetings are run in each home by fellowship coordinators who have completed The Way of Abundance and Power or the Power for Abundant Living Today class series. The Way International claims no official membership other than the board of directors; individuals who participate in fellowships are referred to as "followers of the way," or "believers".

Until at least the late 1980s, The Way's organization was based on a tree with "leaves" (individual believers), "twigs" (small group fellowships of about 6 to 12 persons, usually private homes or college bible groups), "branches" (groups of two or more fellowships in a local area such as a city), "limbs" (state organizations), "regions" (groupings of several "limbs") and the international headquarters in New Knoxville being the "trunk".

=== Classes ===
The Way offers three sequential classes covering Bible studies. The Foundational and Intermediate classes are required prior to taking any other classes. To qualify for the Advanced class, which is held specially in Ohio each summer, a student must first complete the Foundational and Intermediate classes twice, in addition to Defeating the Adversary. Classes offered include:

- The Foundational Class on Power for Abundant Living Today
- The Intermediate Class on Power for Abundant Living Today
- The Advanced Class on Power for Abundant Living Today
- Defeating the Adversary
- Living God's Word as a Family
- Practical Keys to Biblical Research
- The Renewed Mind: The Key to Power
- Living the Mystery as Members in Particular
- Living the Book of Acts Today

For years The Way offered a twelve-session, over 33-hour long Power for Abundant Living class, taught live by Wierwille beginning in 1953. This class was offered in video and audio tape form from 1968 until it was replaced in 1995 by Martindale's class The Way of Abundance and Power, which was restructured and re-filmed, being released in 2006. The class was then replaced by Power for Abundant Living Today in 2022.

== Programs ==
=== The Way Corps and College ===
In 1970, Wierwille formalized his selection and training of ministry leaders by starting "The Way Corps". The Way Corps' motto is "It Is Written". Prior to the First Corps, Wierwille invited a group of Way followers to New Knoxville for training and teaching. He disbanded the group for reasons which were never made public, other than a statement in The Way: Living in Love that they "never got it together among themselves", and that Wierwille "gave them the privilege of leaving". This group was later referred to as "The Zero Corps".

In 1977, the Way purchased property in Rome City, Indiana, where the "Family Corps", those adults who wanted to train as leaders but had children or were older (over 40), resided and trained. A 200-acre (81 ha) working farm, Rome City, was purchased from the Catholic Church.

In 1974, The Way purchased the former site of the College of Emporia, a United Presbyterian college in Emporia, Kansas, with an opening enrollment of 400 students. It housed the College Division and Way Corps. The College Division, a single or two-year program, focused on Biblical study and the Way Corps, a four-year program, focused on future minister or leadership training. Activities during the campus residencies included basic mandatory physical activity and other optional activities as desired (such as jogging, weightlifting, and team sports). Days were spent on work assignments, usually involving the needs of each campus (such as painting, food service, construction, building renovation, sanitation, gardening). Other programs included Biblical research and study nights, led by ministry staff, and typically involved in-depth study of various books of the Bible. Before senior year, Way Corps students left for an interim year as missionaries.

One of the work projects of the Emporia campus was the restoration of the Anderson Memorial Library, a Carnegie library built in 1901 that had fallen into disrepair. It was rededicated in 1986 and placed on the National Register of Historic Places on June 25, 1987.

Upon completion of the four-year curriculum, graduates receive an accredited degree in theology. Way Corps duties include "providing spiritual leadership at all levels and carrying out decisions made by the Board of Directors". The Way has ordained Way Corps graduates over the years, and both men and women serve as clergy. Neither graduation from the Way Corps nor accepting a high leadership position guarantee ordination.

=== Rock of Ages ===
A yearly gathering of Way followers in New Knoxville known as "The Rock of Ages" was a Way event that took place from 1970 until 1995, when it was discontinued. One of the purposes of the festival was to welcome home returning Word Over the World Ambassadors (the Way's first missionary program) and to send out a new group on their yearly assignment. On March 31, 2024, The Way announced the return of the Rock of Ages in 2025.

== Publications ==
Wierwille believed that the New Testament was originally written in Aramaic. In 1957, he began his association with Aramaic Bible scholar George M. Lamsa, and Lamsa finished his translation of the Lamsa Bible in Wierwille's home. Lamsa and Wierwille produced the first American Aramaic Grammar in 1960.

In 1985, The Way published a Concordance to the Peshitta Version of the Aramaic New Testament, followed by a three-volume interlinear version of the Syriac New Testament Bible in 1988, after a 15-year effort by The Way International Biblical Research Team. The Way Biblical Research team cataloged 600 Aramaic manuscripts to compile their New Testament text and lexical aids.

Wierwille's other major publications include Jesus Christ Our Passover, Jesus Christ Our Promised Seed, Jesus Christ Is Not God, Are the Dead Alive Now?, The Bible Tells Me So, The New, Dynamic Church, The Word's Way, God’s Magnified Word, Order My Steps in Thy Word, and Receiving the Holy Spirit Today.

=== Aramaic publications ===
- Aramaic-English Interlinear New Testament – 1988
  - Volume 1 Matthew – John
  - Volume 2 Acts – Philemon
  - Volume 3 Hebrews – Revelation
- The Concordance to the Peshitta Version of the Aramaic New Testament − 1985
- The English Dictionary Supplement to the Concordance to the Peshitta Version of the Aramaic New Testament – 1985
- The Aramaic New Testament Estrangelo Script – 1983

== Beliefs and doctrine ==
The Way International's belief system is based on the scriptures of the Old and New Testaments being "given by inspiration of God" (2 Timothy 3:16) and perfect as originally given. It believes that these Scriptures are the final authority for believing and godliness.

The Way International believes:

- In one God, the Creator of the heavens and earth, and in the divine conception of Jesus by God, and that he is the Son of God, not God the son.
- Jesus Christ died for the sins of humanity and God raised Jesus from the dead and ascended him into heaven.
- All who confess with their mouth the Lord Jesus and believe in their heart that God raised him from the dead are born again by the spirit of God, receiving eternal life, and thereby are "sons of God."
- In the receiving of the fullness of the Holy Spirit, God's power from on high, which may be evidenced by all born-again believers by the nine manifestations of Holy Spirit: speaking in tongues, interpretation of tongues, prophecy, word of knowledge, word of wisdom, discerning of spirits, faith (believing), miracles, and healing.
- That it is available to receive all that God promises in his Word according to one's believing faith, appropriating God's abundance to their life.

=== Differences from mainstream Christianity ===
The Way International believes that Jesus is the Son of God, not God the Son. In their view, unlike God, Jesus is not omniscient, omnipotent, nor omnipresent. Jesus did not exist before his birth except in the foreknowledge of God; at his conception, God created the sperm to fertilize Mary's ovum, and is the literal father of Jesus. Joseph and Mary married soon after she became pregnant with Jesus and had sexual relations after the birth of Jesus. The Way dates the birth of Jesus on September 11, 3 BC.

In "Receiving the Holy Spirit Today", The Way believes the Holy Spirit is a direct reference to God, rather than a separate entity or person. This term is contrasted with the "holy spirit", which is a reference to a "divine gift" from God. Wierwille claimed that English translators of the Bible missed this distinction, and that Greek manuscripts were written in uncial script, which further confused the subject. The Way also posits that there are nine manifestations of the Holy Spirit and every born again Christian can inherently operate all nine. The list is derived from 1 Corinthians 12:7–10. Speaking in tongues energizes the "effectual operation" of the other eight manifestations, and thus holds an important place in The Way's doctrine for this reason.

The Way's beliefs about Christ's passion differ in several details: they believe Jesus was crucified on Wednesday (instead of Friday) and raised three days later on a Saturday before sunset (instead of Sunday morning). Jesus died upon a stake, together with four other individuals (instead of two), two thieves and two malefactors, based on the use of different words in the gospels of Luke and Matthew, specifically, kakourgoi and lēstai.

According to The Way, the cross upon which Jesus was crucified was not the traditional T-shaped cross, but rather a stake or the trunk of a tree. Furthermore, Jesus did not carry his cross; rather, after leaving the judgment hall, the soldiers immediately compelled Simon of Cyrene to bear the cross all the way to Calvary per the three Gospel accounts in Matthew 27:32, Mark 15:21 and Luke 23:26. The one account in John 19:17 which states "And he bearing his cross...", is argued that it refers to Jesus' spiritual "bearing of sin".

The Way makes a distinction between the bride of Christ and the body of Christ, the body of Christ beginning on the Day of Pentecost and continuing until the return of Christ.

The "thorn in the flesh" in 2 Corinthians 12:7 is interpreted as individuals sent by Satan to disrupt the apostle Paul's ministry, not an illness as it is commonly interpreted. The Way also does not believe that the dead immediately go to heaven to be in the presence of the Lord, or unbelievers to hell, but rather that death is a continuing state which will end only when Jesus Christ returns for his saints (1 Thessalonians 4:13–18; 1 Corinthians 15:51–54) and with his saints. In this way they believe that souls are not immortal, thus remaining dead until the final resurrection, which is known by some as "soul sleep". Wierwille also wrote that the "unsaved" simply "die a second and final death". Way followers reject water baptism, holding that it was not intended as a continuing practice after Pentecost, and that it applied only to Israel. With the coming of the greater (the practice of baptizing in holy spirit) the lesser (baptizing in water) is done away with.

The Way notably believes that once a person is born again, they receive "holy spirit" and cannot lose it through any sinful acts. Tithing one's net income to the church is a recommended minimum, taking the example from Abraham's donation to Melchizedek, as well as the instruction in Malachi 3:7–12. Additional voluntary giving is called "abundant sharing", and "plurality giving", which refers to the donation of any excess items the owner feels they no longer need or have too many of, generally within fellowships to help the other members.

The Way believes extreme forms of unusual or destructive behavior (i.e., extreme violence, alcoholism, homosexuality, some forms of mental illness) can be evidence that an individual is possessed by a "devil spirit". A "devil spirit" is equivalent to a demon in most other Christian cosmologies. The Way teaches that believers have the power to cast out devil spirits but should only do so if given divine revelation to do so.

== Other beliefs ==
=== Abortion ===
In contrast to Evangelical, Orthodox and Catholic Christians, The Way teaches that abortion is not murder as a fetus does not have "breath life" and therefore does not have its "living soul" until it takes its first breath when born.

=== Smoking and drinking ===
Unlike some Bible-based Christian sects, The Way is tolerant of smoking and drinking. They recommend a "two drink" limit for leaders, and those participating as active Way Corps do not use any tobacco products.

=== Homosexuality ===
The Way believes that homosexuality is not God's design and agrees with many Christian organizations on this position (Baptist, Roman Catholic, Evangelical Protestant, Pentecostal, Jehovah's Witnesses, Seventh-day Adventist, etc.). They reject the idea that homosexuality is genetically determined and believe that it is a person's free-willed choice. The Way derives its teaching through Biblical sources such as Romans 1:27 and Leviticus 18:22 in the King James Bible that "Thou shall not lie with mankind, as with womankind: it is abomination". If homosexuality were genetically determined then a homosexual would be destined by God to a lifetime of error and sin.

== Controversies ==
=== Cult allegations in the 1980s-1990s ===
According to sociologist J. Gordon Melton, "In the 1980s The Way International was widely denounced as a cult that 'brainwashed' its youthful converts, and opponents of the group made many attempts to draw away members through 'deprogramming'." On the World Religions and Spirituality Project website, sociologist David G. Bromley states that, at one point, The Way experienced more deprogrammings than the Unification Church. Criticisms included unquestioning obedience, "controlling doctrine, lifestyle choices, and even personal relationships. Former insiders describe an environment of fear, manipulation, and authoritarian oversight, all framed as divine guidance". In the 1988 book Combatting Cult Mind Control by American mental health counselor and researcher of new religious movements and cults Steven Hassan, a former member criticizes The Way for being a cult which lies on the authenticity of Wierwille's doctorate, uses speaking in tongues to block free thinking, underlines the Devil's power to generate fear and total obedience, and claims to be the only one to teach the biblical Truth, thus displaying elitism and paranoia among members. The French Commission on Cults registered The Way International as a cult in its 1995 report (see Governmental lists of cults and sects), under the name "La voie internationale", and stated it had between 50 and 500 followers in France. However, on 27 May 2005, the 1995 annex of the French report and cult classifications were officially cancelled and invalidated by the Jean-Pierre Raffarin's circulaire.

=== Sexual misconduct ===
The second president of The Way, Craig Martindale, admitted to sexual misconduct with a younger married female follower in early 2000. The woman and her husband sued The Way, as well as Martindale, Rosalie R. Rivenbark, John Reynolds, Donald E. Wierwille, Ramona Biden, Howard Allen, and up to 50 unnamed members of "The Way Leadership". Judge Schmitt of Shelby County's Common Pleas Court upheld four of their claims as viable, including the allegation that Frances Allen was sexually victimized by Martindale, Biden, and others; that the assault upon Frances Allen occurred as a result of civil conspiracy; that The Way engaged in a pattern of corrupt activity which included acts of assault and rape; and breach of contract. Defendants settled about a month after the ruling.

== See also ==
- Way Productions — The Way International's musical performers
- The Way College of Biblical Research - Indiana Campus
