= Nudus nudum Christum sequi =

Ascetic motto

"Nudus nudum Christum sequi" (or "Nudus nudum Christum sequere") is an early Franciscan and ancient Christian ascetic motto translated from Latin as "Naked followers of the naked Christ" which served as an adage to embrace the fragility of humanity and express the mortality of Jesus of Nazareth through the drawing of His pudenda ("which is to be ashamed of"; i.e. his genitalia). The phrase originated from Saint Jerome who wrote in four letters to embrace a life in the mold of Jesus of Nazareth—a life of poverty and humility—and to embrace a life like a man naked, following the "naked Christ" or the "naked cross".

== History ==
The phrase originated and was popularized by Eusebius Sophronius Hieronymus—known best as Saint Jerome—who wrote in four of his letters to embrace poverty, humility, and a life divorced from worldly desires. To further illustrate this point, Jerome offers the image of a man stripping himself naked to follow the "naked Christ" or the "naked cross". The phrase draws on the encounter Jesus of Nazareth had with the rich man in the synoptic Gospels:

The young man saith unto him, All these things have I kept from my youth up: what lack I yet? Jesus said unto him, If thou wilt be perfect, go and sell that thou hast, and give to the poor, and thou shalt have treasure in heaven: and come and follow me. (Gospel of Matthew 19.20–21, King James Version; cf. 16.24; see Mark 10.17–31, Luke 18.18–30)

The recommended following of "the naked crucified Christ" was integral to the larger and quintessential characteristics of Franciscan spirituality: a heartfelt contemplation of the poor and of the suffering humanity of Jesus. The humanization of Jesus has endured in many forms of art, poetry, and traditions within Christianity, such as the presepio and Stations of the Cross.

== Criticism and reception ==
In 1983, Leo Steinberg, a Russian-born American art critic, wrote The Sexuality of Christ in Renaissance Art and in Modern Oblivion as a blunt overlook of how many depictions of Jesus and his genitalia are "indisputably a central thematic concern." He first argues:

The first necessity is to admit a long-suppressed matter of fact: that Renaissance art, both north and south of the Alps, produced a large body of devotional images in which the genitalia of the Christ Child, or of the dead Christ, receive such demonstrative emphasis that one must recognize an ostentatio genitalium comparable to the canonic ostentatio vulnerum, the showing forth of the wounds.

In the book, he additionally attempts to find "theological grounds" for this concern to depict the teacher naked, which he sees as the embodiment of the doctrine of the Incarnation, showing that Jesus was linked with the great chain of human procreation – even though divinely perfect. This is in part due to the pattern of drawing the emphases of nudity in paintings depicting Jesus in the beginning and end of his life—the Word of God made Flesh (see Gospel of John 1.1).
