= Christian press =

Christian press may refer to:

- Christian media
- American Christian Press
- Christen Press, American soccer player
