= K. C. Pillai (bishop) =

- K. C. Pillai (1900–1970)
- Born: Mudigolam, Chittoor District, Andhra Pradesh, India
- Died: 20 February 1970; Birmingham, Alabama, US
- Education: Master of Arts, Doctor of Divinity
- Occupations: Bishop, Biblical Scholar
- Known for: Eastern Manners, Customs and Orientalisms of the Bible
- Spouse: Swarnamma Pillai
- Children: 3

Karnam Chengalvaraya Pillai (1900–1970) was a bishop, Antiochean Succession, Chennai (Madras), India.

== Career ==
He wrote books and worked with western Christians to help clarify what he believed were difficult Scriptural passages through an understanding of the eastern manners and customs.

He spent the last twenty years of his life in the United States on a special mission to acquaint Christians with the orientalisms of the Bible. While there, he became associated with Victor Paul Wierwille, the founding president of The Way International and according to the book Born Again to Serve by the American Christian Press, Pillai and Wierwille worked through every orientalism in the Bible from Genesis through Revelation over a six-week period in 1953.

== Selected works ==
- Light Through an Eastern Window
  - Robert Speller & Sons, publishers (1963) ISBN 0-8315-0057-3
  - The Way International: American Christian Press (1987). ISBN 0-910068-63-1
- Orientalisms of the Bible – Volumes 1 & 2
  - Munkus Publishing Company, INC. (1969, 1974)
  - The Way International: American Christian Press (1984). ISBN 0-910068-70-4

== Legacy ==
In 1980, Reverend Bo Reahard compiled several of Pillai's teachings in his work Old and New Testament Orientalisms – Teachings of Bishop K.C. Pillai and in 2010, Jeanie Strand Chilton published the work Eastern Customs of the Bible: The Teachings of Bishop K. C. Pillai.
