= Eye of a needle =

Metaphor for an unthinkable thought in Abrahamic religions

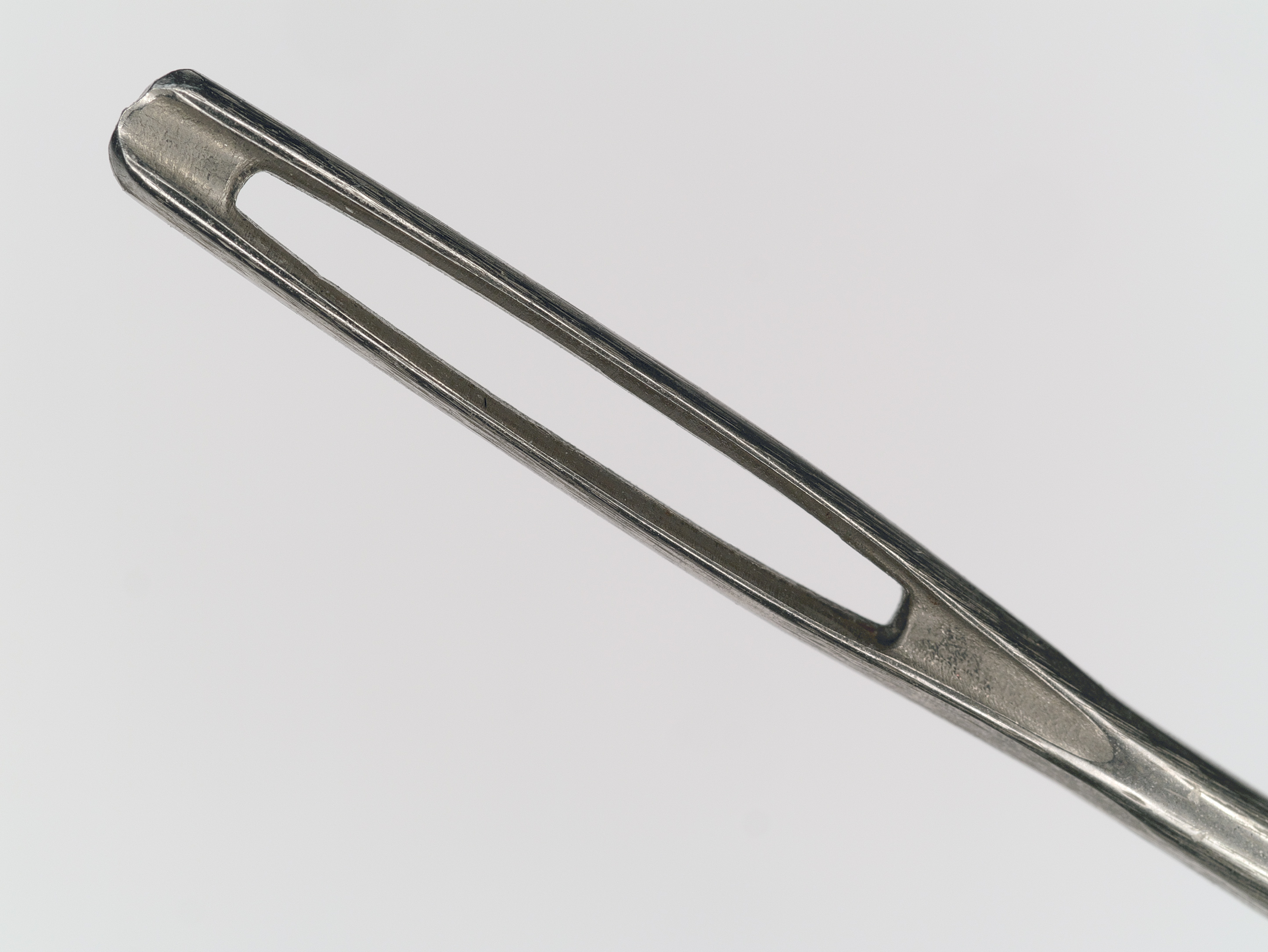
Eye of a needle

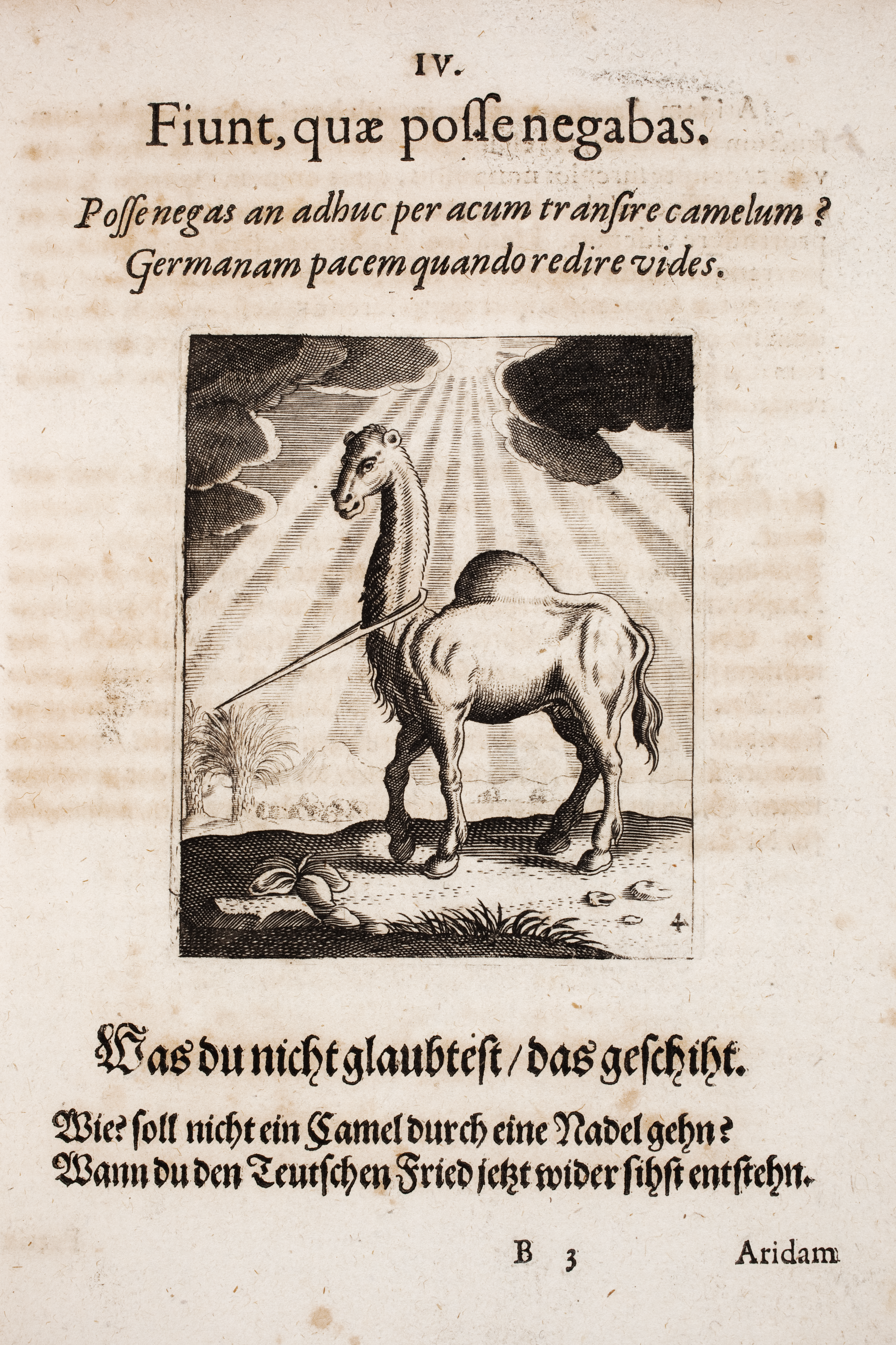
A dromedary camel passing through the eye of a needle, as a symbol of the improbable Peace of Westphalia. Engraving, Johann Vogel: Meditationes emblematicae de restaurata pace Germaniae, 1649.

The term "eye of a needle" is used as a metaphor for a very narrow opening. It occurs several times throughout the Talmud. The New Testament quotes Jesus as saying in Matthew 19:24, Mark 10:25, and Luke 18:25 that "it is easier for a camel to go through the eye of a needle than for a rich man to enter the kingdom of God". It also appears in the Qur'an 7:40, "Indeed, those who deny Our verses and are arrogant toward them – the gates of Heaven will not be opened for them, nor will they enter Paradise until a camel enters into the eye of a needle. And thus do We recompense the criminals."

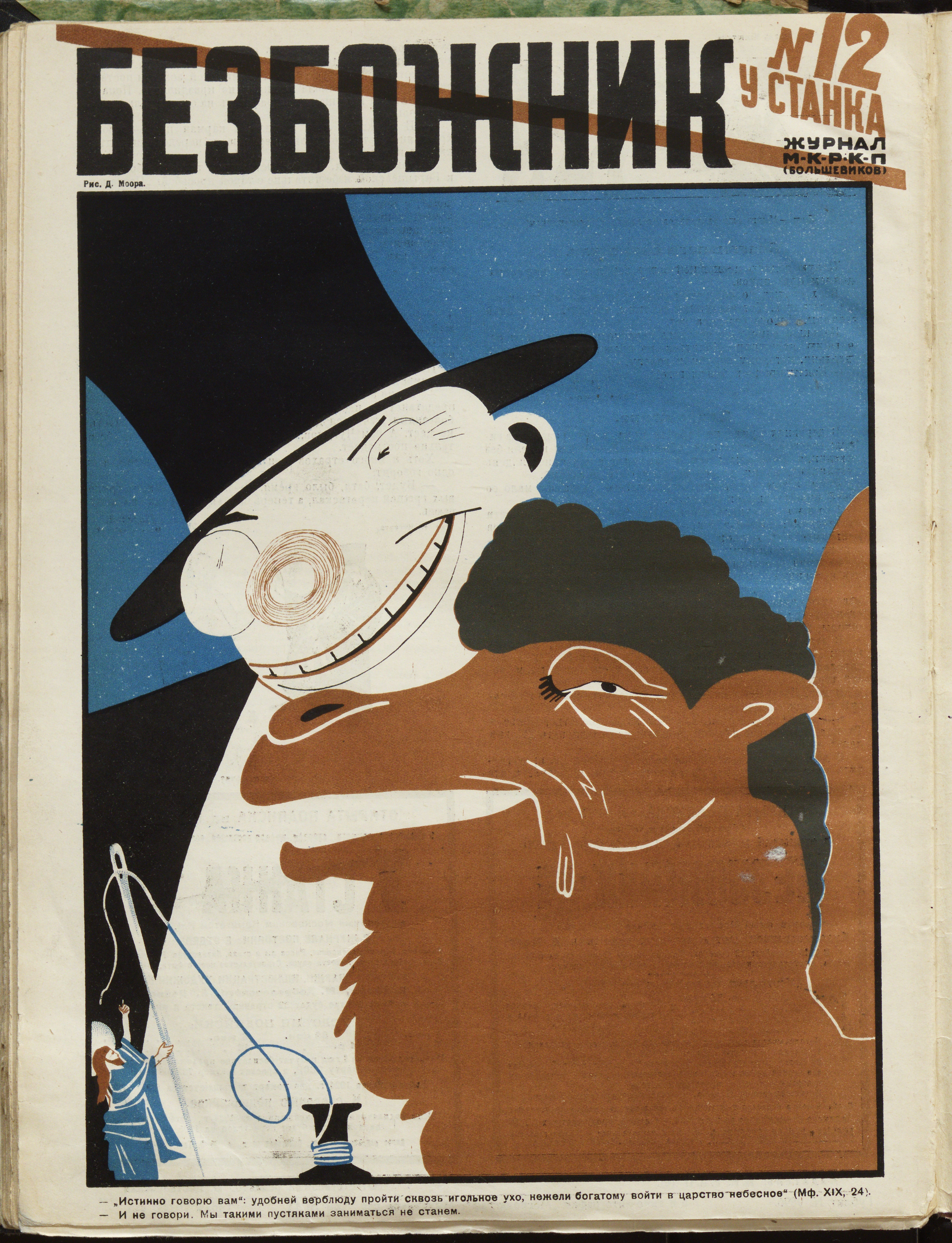
Mocking the religious metaphor in Soviet atheist magazine Bezbozhnik u Stanka, 1924

== Aphorisms ==
=== Judaism ===
The Babylonian Talmud applies the aphorism to unthinkable thoughts. To explain that dreams reveal the thoughts of a man's heart and are the product of reason rather than the absence of it, some rabbis say:

They do not show a man a palm tree of gold, nor an elephant going through the eye of a needle.

A midrash on the Song of Songs uses the phrase to speak of God's willingness and ability beyond comparison to accomplish the salvation of a sinner:

The Holy One said, open for me a door as big as a needle's eye and I will open for you a door through which may enter tents and camels.

Rav Sheishet of Nehardea applied the same aphorism to the reasoning for which the sages of Pumbedita were evidently famous: "Are you from Pumbedita, where they push an elephant through the eye of a needle?" (Baba Metzia, 38b).

=== Christianity ===
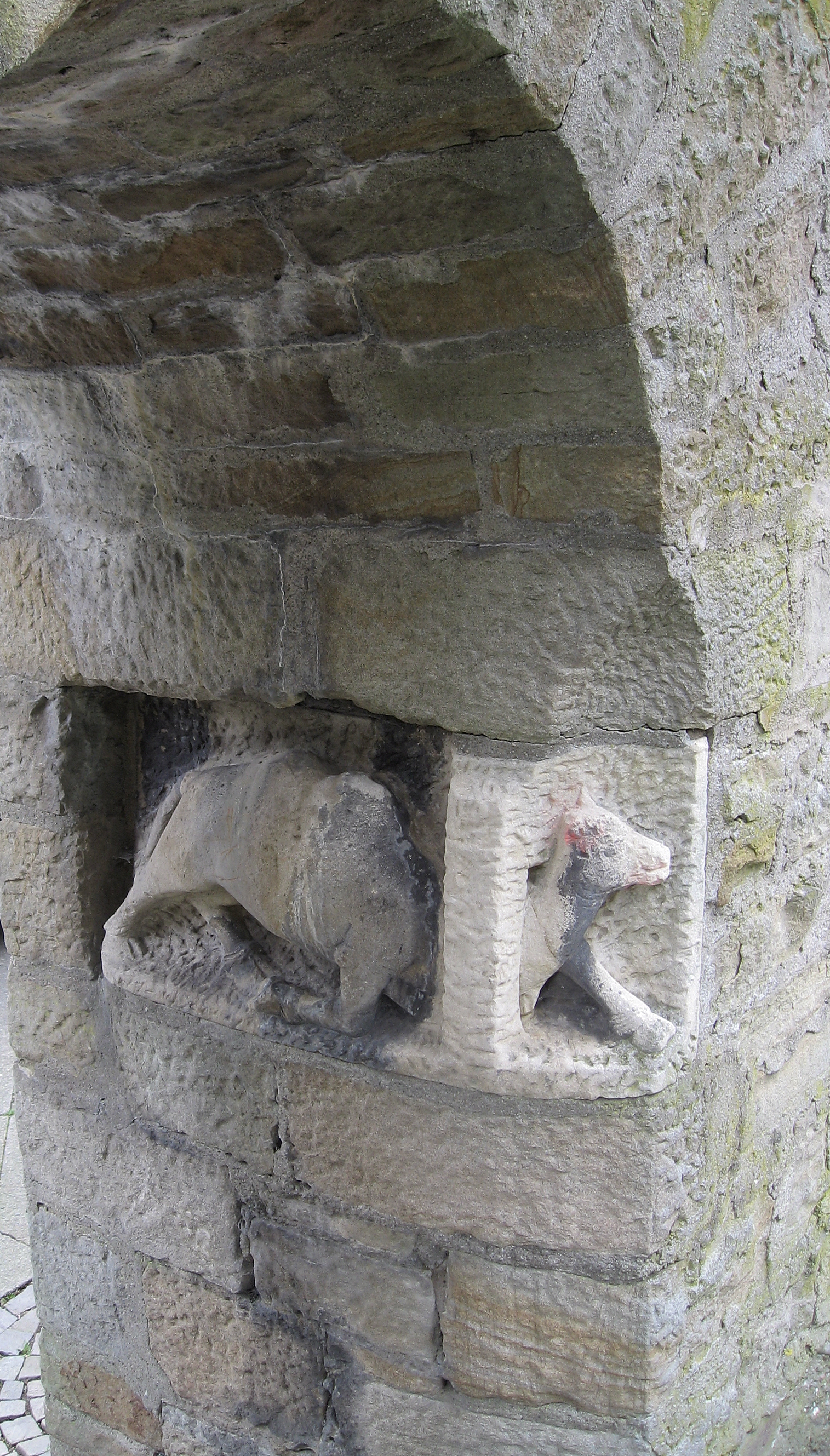
A church portal relief in Dortmund referencing Jesus's use of "camel through the eye of a needle" aphorism

"The eye of a needle" is a portion of a quotation attributed to Jesus in the synoptic gospels:

"I tell you the truth, it is hard for a rich man to enter the kingdom of heaven. Again I tell you, it is easier for a camel to go through the eye of a needle than for a rich man to enter the kingdom of God." When the disciples heard this, they were greatly astonished and asked, 'Who then can be saved?' Jesus looked at them and said, 'With man this is impossible, but with God all things are possible.'

The saying was a response to a young rich man who had asked Jesus what he needed to do to inherit eternal life. Jesus replied that he should keep the commandments, which the man replied that he had done so. Jesus responded, "If you want to be perfect, go, sell your possessions and give to the poor, and you will have treasure in heaven. Then come, follow me." The young man became sad and was unwilling to do that. Jesus then spoke that response, leaving his disciples astonished.

In modern times, the scripture has been used as a counterargument to the prosperity gospel, the belief that accruing wealth is a virtue favored by God.

==== Proposed alternative readings ====
The "Eye of the Needle" has been claimed to be a gate in Jerusalem, which opened after the main gate was closed at night. A camel could not pass through the smaller gate unless it was stooped and had its baggage removed – thus making it difficult, but not impossible, for a camel to "pass through the Eye of the Needle", and by analogy difficult, but not impossible, for a rich man to enter the kingdom of heaven. This alternative reading has been put forth since at least the 11th century and possibly as far back as the 9th century. However, there is no evidence for the existence of such a gate.

Cyril of Alexandria (fragment 219) claimed that "camel" was a Greek scribal error – that Biblical Greek: κάμηλος, romanized: kámēlos, lit. 'camel' was written in place of Biblical Greek: κάμιλος, romanized: kámilos, lit. 'rope' or 'cable'. Arthur Schopenhauer, in The World as Will and Representation, Volume 1, § 68, follows this reading when he translates the Greek word as Ankertau "anchor cable" rather than as "camel". George Lamsa, in his 1933 translation of the Bible into English from the Syriac, did the same. However, the evidence does not support this hypothesis, and in fact militates strongly against it (for example, the similar proverbs quoted above involving elephants, which are not homonymous with any form of cable).

=== Islam ===
According to the English interpretation of the Quran:

To those who reject Our signs and treat them with arrogance, no opening will there be of the gates of heaven, nor will they enter the garden, until the camel can pass through the eye of the needle: Such is Our reward for those in sin.

The camel, in Arabic jamal, can also be translated as "twisted rope".

A poem by Rumi says:

The double end of thread is not for the eye of the needle: inasmuch as thou art single, come into the needle.

'Tis the thread that is connected with the needle: the eye of the needle is not suitable for the camel.

== In non-religious context ==
The concept of a camel passing through the eye of a needle is also documented among the Multani people of Pakistan, "A string of camels is passing through the needle's eye!". The source does not indicate if this saying was used in religious contexts.

== See also ==
- Christian views on poverty and wealth
- Epistle of James, 5:1-6
- Cutwork
- Matthew 7:13, about the broad gate and the narrow gate
- Simple living
