= G. E. Lowman =

American clergyman (1897–1965)

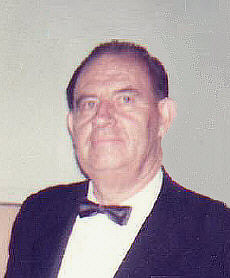
- Rev. Dr. G. E. Lowman in 1964
- Born: November 16, 1897; Linthicum Heights, Maryland, U.S.
- Died: January 18, 1965 (aged 67); St. Petersburg, Florida, U.S.
- Education: B.Th., Burton College and Seminary, July 1930
- Spouse: Minnie Anna Wagner
- Children: Elmer, Ruth, Edna, Doris, Vernon, Darlene
- Parent(s): Oliver Lowman and Annie Perkins
- Writings: Prophecies for the Times (series)
- Congregations served: Baltimore Gospel Tabernacle (1930–1959); International Gospel Broadcasters weekly radio program (1930–1965)

Guerdon Elmer Lowman, more familiarly G. E. Lowman (November 16, 1897 – January 18, 1965) was an American Christian clergyman and a pioneering international radio evangelist beginning in 1930, following a successful business career.

He was called by contemporary newspapers "a noted preacher", whose "forceful sermons" addressed "timely and interesting topics". His non-denominational radio ministry had a worldwide audience from the 1930s until 1965.

== Early years ==
G. E. Lowman was born in Baltimore, Maryland, where he worked in the local shipyards as a teenager, becoming a Christian at the age of 17. He married Minnie Wagner (1901–1988) on December 8, 1917, and they had six children.

In his early twenties, he began a commercial electrical contracting company. Later, he acquired a spinoff supermarket chain in the Baltimore region from Sanitary Grocery Stores, which he renamed "Twin Food".

== Ministry ==
=== Baltimore Gospel Tabernacle ===
In the late 1920s, G. E. Lowman was ordained as a Methodist minister and began preaching at churches and missions in the Baltimore area. He also became a familiar sight in the city, using a specially equipped bus with a platform and loudspeakers to hold outdoor evangelistic rallies on Baltimore street corners.

So popular was his preaching that G. E. Lowman founded the Baltimore Gospel Tabernacle in 1930, building a large Romanesque Revival-style stone church at the corner of Federal and Wolfe Streets, in an east Baltimore neighborhood near Johns Hopkins Hospital. A Lutheran church and later a Mormon congregation had previously occupied a portion of the site since 1893, and the newly constructed Baltimore Gospel Tabernacle incorporated the former structure in its design, more than tripling the building's overall size. When completed, the building had a seating capacity of 500 persons at a cost of $45,000 (approximately $735,000 in 2021 dollars). Several large stained glass windows were installed in the new edifice, one of which was donated by a Titanic survivor. Atop the Tabernacle's west tower was an illuminated cross, which revolved when services were underway, one of four revolving crosses in existence in the U.S. at the time.

The newly completed church was dedicated on October 19, 1930, and Pastor Lowman began weekly live radio broadcasts of the services on Wednesdays and Sundays on WCAO and WCBM. On the church's first anniversary in October 1931, the Baltimore Post reported: "The Gospel Tabernacle is interdenominational in character and from 10 to 15 different denominations are represented at the services". In celebration of the anniversary, "jubilee services were held nightly for two weeks, with ministers from different churches conducting the services," the newspaper said. Further expansion of the church occurred in 1933 with the addition of a south transept and a second balcony to accommodate the overflow crowds. By the late-1930s, attendance at the Tabernacle was typically 1,500-1,800 persons at each service. Prominent Baltimore attorney Theodore R. McKeldin (and later Mayor of Baltimore and future Maryland Governor) was a frequent Tabernacle guest speaker.

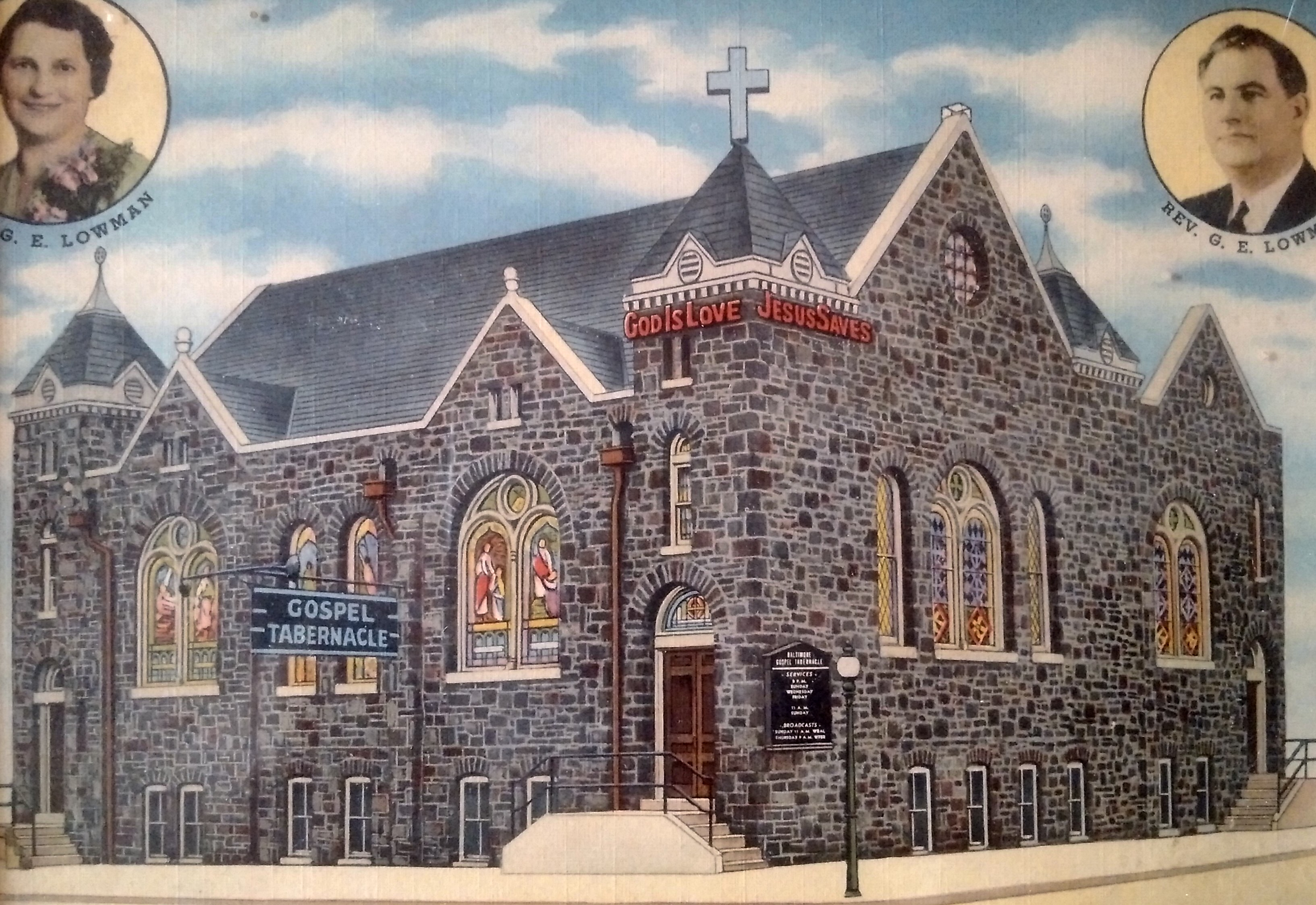
Rev. and Mrs. G.E. Lowman and the Tabernacle in a mid-1930s print, distributed to the radio audience

The Tabernacle broadcasts eventually reached coast-to-coast in the U.S., including such high-powered, Class 1-A clear channel radio stations as WABC in New York City, WLS in Chicago, and WBT in Charlotte, North Carolina. Worldwide, the program was broadcast on major medium wave and shortwave stations in Europe, Asia, Africa, and Australia, originated by flagship station WBAL (AM). By the late 1930s, the Pittsburgh Post-Gazette said of Rev. Lowman, "the noted radio evangelist and founder of the Baltimore Gospel Tabernacle ... is well-known to Pittsburghers inasmuch as his forceful sermons are transmitted here from the Baltimore Tabernacle". In August 1941, WNOX (now WNML) in Knoxville, Tennessee, began carrying the broadcast, which it advertised as "inspiring and timely messages by one of America's religious leaders", but six months later a controversy ensued when the radio station refused to broadcast a sermon in which Rev. Lowman mentioned the word "fornication", prompting protests from disappointed listeners. When the program debuted on WELI in New Haven, Connecticut, in 1940, a radio columnist for the New Haven Register described the broadcasts as "one of America's most unique and varied religious programs, conducted by Rev. G. E. Lowman, a noted preacher who takes for his topics timely and interesting subjects that are up-to-the moment".

During World War II, the U.S. Office of Censorship required Lowman's sermon texts to be submitted for review prior to airing, because of the broadcast's international coverage. This restriction curtailed his extemporaneous preaching style until wartime restrictions were lifted on August 15, 1945. When peace returned to the Philippines and civilian control of Manila's radio station DZRH was restored, the Tabernacle broadcast became a Sunday afternoon feature on the capital city's prominent station. Broadcasts on China's Radio Peking ended in 1949 with the Communist takeover, however. Other prominent short-wave stations carrying the broadcasts on a delayed basis included Radio Ceylon (now Sri Lanka) and Radio Monte Carlo.

In the late 1950s, a second weekly live radio program was also carried on the Mutual Broadcasting System network in the U.S. on Sunday nights. Ratings were adversely affected by prime time television competition from such popular programs as The Ed Sullivan Show in the same 8 p.m. Eastern time slot and the evening radio program ended in 1959.

The programs were also noted for their music, featuring the Tabernacle's Möller pipe organ accompanying the congregation singing hymn favorites. Each broadcast began with the signature theme song, O That Will Be Glory. Daughters Ruth, Edna, and Doris sang as the "Lowman Sisters", ending each broadcast with the Maori melody hymn, "Search Me, O God".

Pastor Lowman authored several books in the series, Prophecies for the Times. His ministry was nondenominational. He wrote, "Many claims are made by certain religions. But no one denomination can rightfully claim that it is the only one. The true church of our Lord and Master is made up of born again people. It is not what we belong to on this earth; it is what we are in Christ".

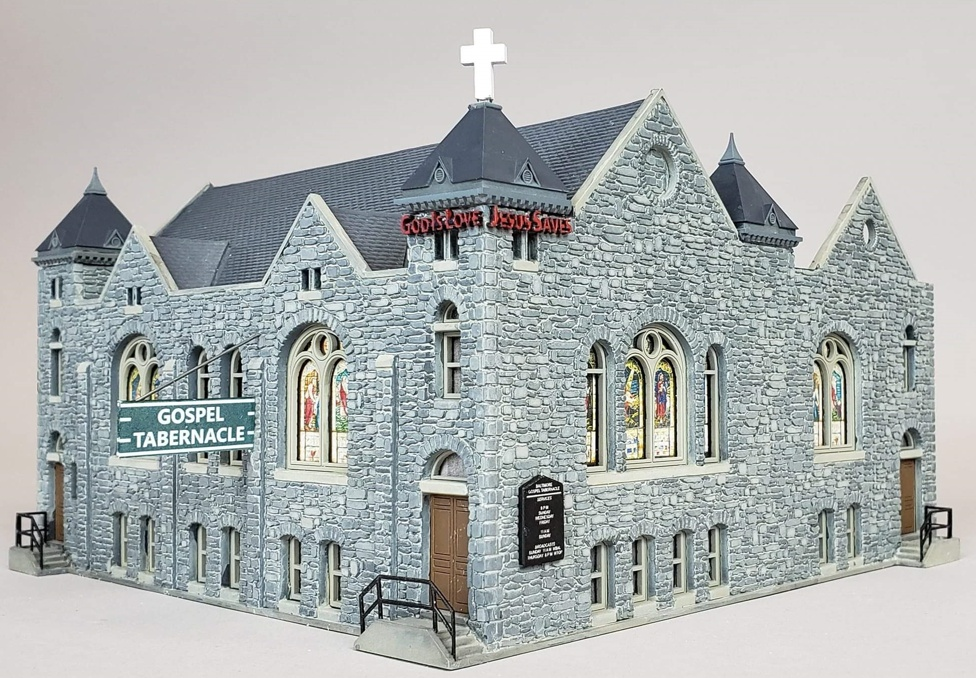
The Baltimore Gospel Tabernacle, as it appeared in the 1930s (HO scale model)

In addition to his writings and weekly ministry at the Tabernacle, Lowman conducted crusades in various cities, at such venues as Pittsburgh's 2,500–seat Soldiers and Sailors Memorial Hall. Outdoor rallies were sometimes held, such as an August 16, 1936, camp meeting at Fairmount Park in Red Lion, Pennsylvania, which attracted a crowd of 4,000 persons. They heard the Tabernacle's 36-voice choir and 18-piece band, along with an "inspiring sermon", the York Gazette and Daily reported. Another Red Lion gathering at Fairmount Park was held the following Labor Day weekend. The following March, he held meetings at the auditorium of William Penn Senior High School in York, Pennsylvania, attended by 1,600 people. Describing it as an "old fashioned spiritual revival", the York Gazette and Daily reported that there were "many conversions" among those listening to his sermon, America Awake, which called on his listeners to "pay less attention to the material side of life ... that one thing is needful — that needful thing being Christ". In November, 1937, the York School District refused to rent the school's auditorium for another evangelistic meeting, claiming that they were for-profit. Lowman's attorney, McKeldin, denied the allegation and cited community leaders in Baltimore who endorsed Lowman's ministry, quoting an Orphans Court judge who commended the "very splendid work he is doing among our people". Lowman was an early proponent of racial harmony during the segregation era, making several speaking appearances in the 1930s at the church of Elder Michaux, a popular African American minister in Washington, D. C.

=== International Gospel Broadcasters ===
The weekly radio broadcast originated live from the Baltimore Gospel Tabernacle on Sunday mornings at 11 a.m. until the final service there on December 13, 1959. The program then moved to studios in St. Petersburg, Florida, where it was produced and distributed by the International Gospel Broadcasters, a non-profit ministry founded by G. E. Lowman. He continued to make guest preaching appearances in the 1960s, such as in Williamsport, Pennsylvania, and Youngstown, Ohio. In April 1962, Lowman spoke at the dedication of the new sanctuary for the Community Gospel Church in Miami, Florida.

When John F. Kennedy, a Catholic, ran for president in 1960, Rev. Lowman questioned whether a Catholic in the White House might be subject to undue influence from the Vatican in secular matters. He wrote "Should a Roman Catholic Be President?" as a chapter in one of his Prophecies for the Times books, published in the summer of 1960, saying: "Each person has the right to their own religious belief. This is one of our precious freedoms and every denomination should have the right in every country to operate and not be hindered. A Roman Catholic is a member of an ecclesiastical system ... that demands the first allegiance of every true member ... and says in a conflict between church and state, the church must prevail." A Roman Catholic President, he said, would be subject to the absolute authority of the Pope according to pre-Vatican II church teachings. As archived in the Presidential Campaign Papers at the John F. Kennedy Presidential Library and Museum, Kennedy's campaign team had Pastor Lowman's book and the candidate responded to the controversy by declaring his belief in the separation of church and state.

Pastor Lowman's 35 years of radio broadcasts ended on January 31, 1965, shortly after his death in St. Petersburg, Florida. The former Baltimore Gospel Tabernacle sanctuary became the St. Paul Community Baptist Church, whose pastor at the time, Rev. Edward M. Revels, had listened to G. E. Lowman's radio broadcasts while working as a Pullman porter in his younger years.

== Honors and legacy ==
In honor of his ministry, Lowman was presented with the Key to the City of Baltimore by then-Mayor Theodore McKeldin on September 14, 1943. The key was made of wood removed from Baltimore's Flag House during the historic building's restoration that year. Pastor Lowman was awarded a Doctor of Divinity degree from Burton College and Seminary in Manitou Springs, Colorado, on May 20, 1957.

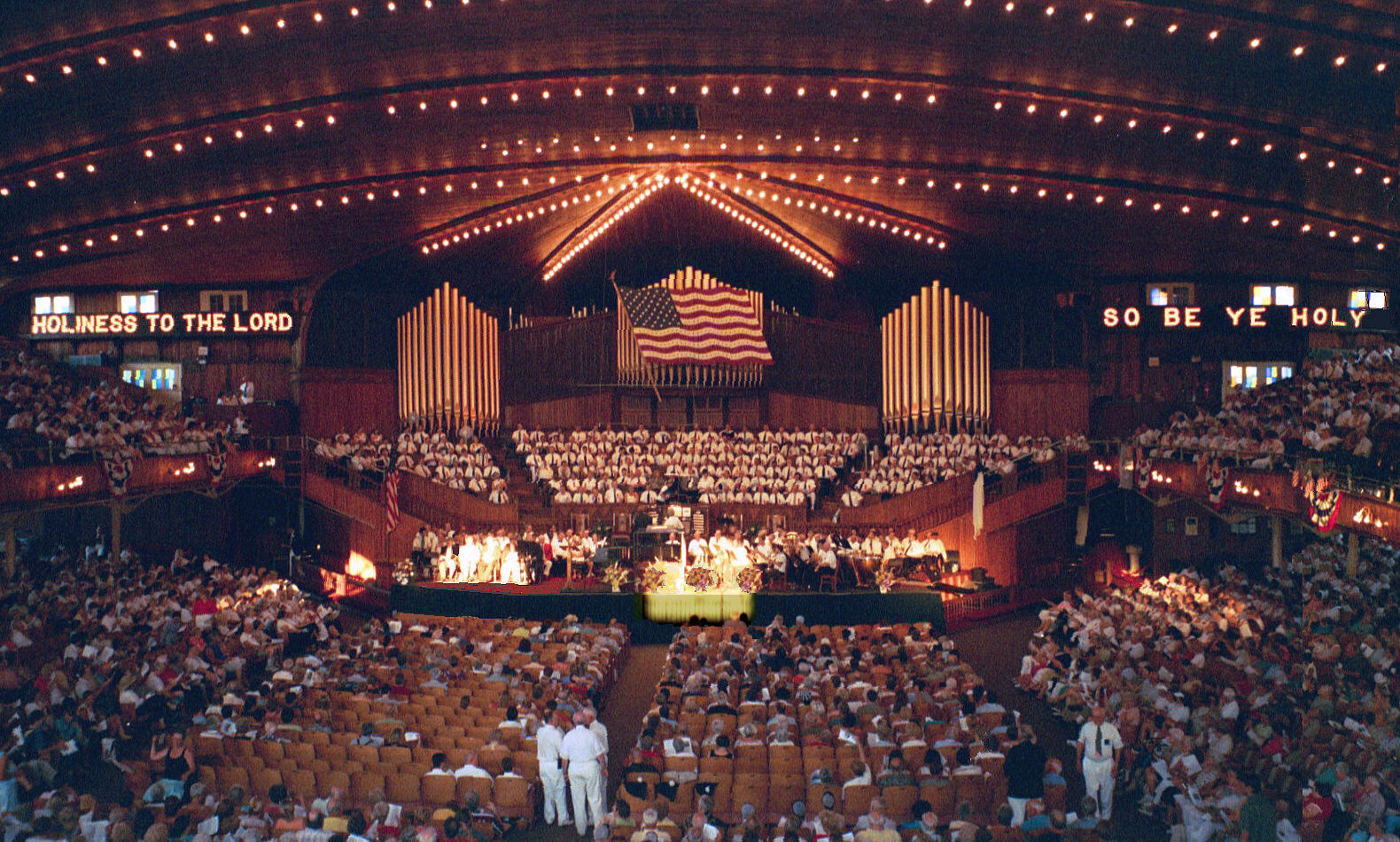
The Ocean Grove Great Auditorium, where a pipe organ rank was dedicated in Rev. Lowman's memory

The former Baltimore Gospel Tabernacle sanctuary, now the St. Paul Community Baptist Church, was designated as an historic landmark on May 6, 2009, by legislative act of the City of Baltimore, because of its "association with historic events and important people". In making the award announcement at City Hall ceremonies, then-mayor Sheila Dixon said, "The City of Baltimore cherishes these jewels because they are unique and authentic ... the real places that tell the real Baltimore stories".

On July 1, 2012, a new 16 ft. Open Wood rank was dedicated in his memory at the pipe organ of the Ocean Grove, New Jersey, Great Auditorium. Organist Gordon Turk played O That Will Be Glory, Pastor Lowman's radio program theme song, at the conclusion of the evening service.

During the 2016 Republican Party presidential primaries, candidate Ben Carson was criticized for saying he would not support a Muslim for president. Writing in The Washington Post, Sarah Kaplan compared Carson's stand to Lowman's opposition to Kennedy in the 1960 U.S. presidential election.

== Death ==
G. E. Lowman moved from his home in Hampton, Maryland, to St. Petersburg, Florida, in 1960, where he died five years later on January 18, 1965, of acute leukemia, ending the worldwide radio ministry of the International Gospel Broadcasters. He is interred at Dulaney Valley Memorial Gardens in Timonium, Maryland.

== Bibliography ==
- Prophecies for the Times in libraries (WorldCat catalog)
- Sermons and Helps for your Advancement toward the Kingdom of God in libraries (WorldCat catalog)
- Sermons and Scriptures: to help others to Christ and strengthen those that know him in libraries (WorldCat catalog)
- Prophecies and Signs for Future Events in libraries (WorldCat catalog)
