= H.E. Fledderjohann Property =

Historic complex in Ohio, United States

- H.E. Fledderjohann House, Doctor's Office and Summer Kitchen
- U.S. National Register of Historic Places
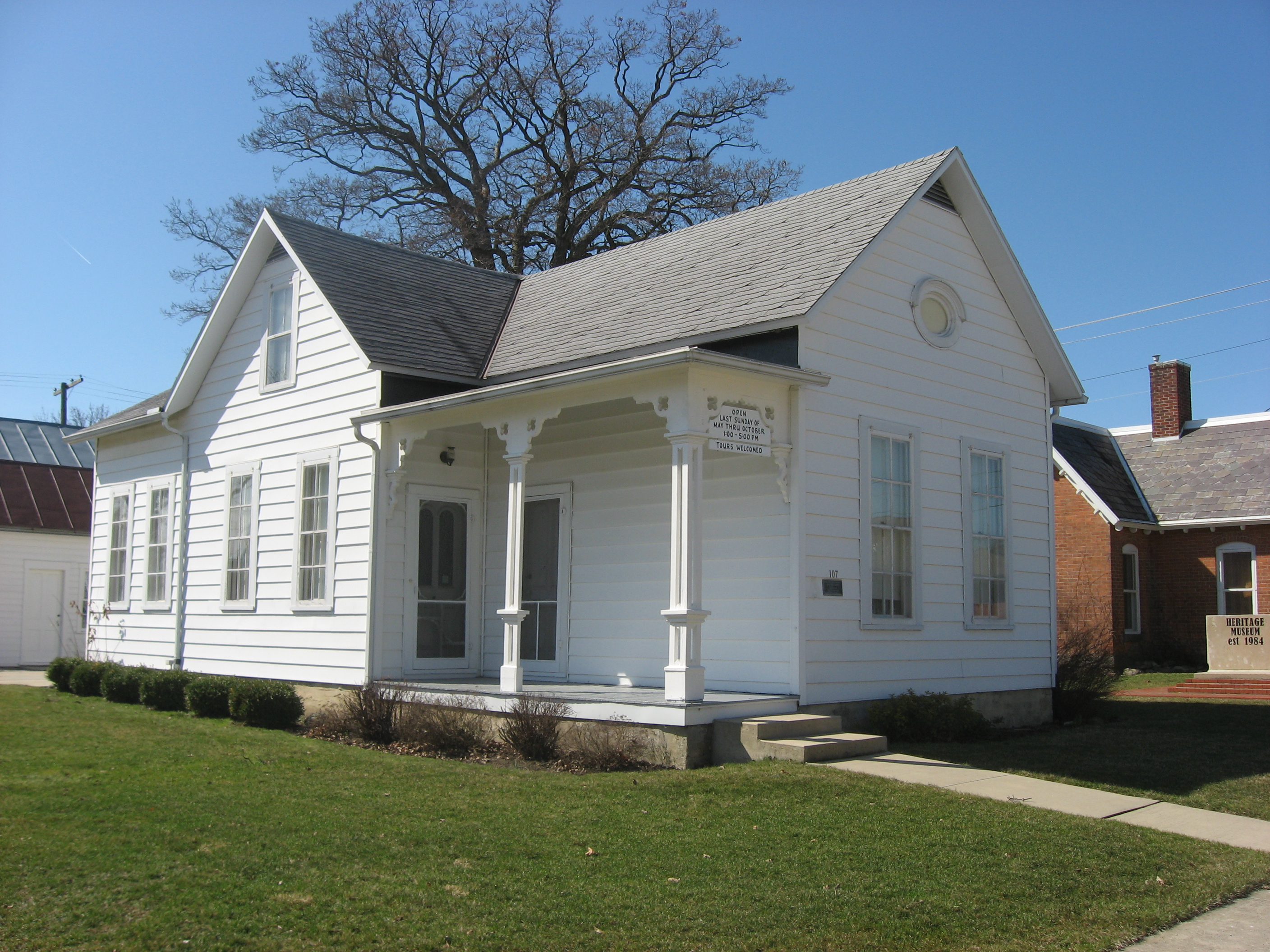
- Front of the house, with the office to the right and the kitchen to the left

- Location within Ohio Location within the United States
- Location: 107 E. German St., New Knoxville, Ohio
- Coordinates: 40°29′36″N 84°18′56″W
- Area: 2 acres (0.81 ha)
- Architectural style: Italianate, Queen Anne
- NRHP reference No.: 93001388
- Added to NRHP: December 10, 1993

The H.E. Fledderjohann Property is a complex of five historic buildings in the village of New Knoxville, Ohio, United States. Three of these structures — a house, a doctor's office, and a standalone kitchen building — were owned and used by Fledderjohann, a prominent New Knoxville physician in the late nineteenth and early twentieth centuries.

== Fledderjohann's life ==
Dr. Fledderjohann was the son of Herman Fledderjohann, a native of Prussia who immigrated to present-day Auglaize County in 1835. Soon after arriving, the elder Fledderjohann began laboring in the construction of the Miami and Erie Canal, and his diligence quickly led to him becoming a foreman and a leading man in the community. He was twice married and fathered eighteen children; among the sons borne by his second wife were Henry and B.A. Fledderjohann, who served in the Ohio House of Representatives. Henry Fledderjohann graduated from the medical school of the University of Pennsylvania in 1886. Upon entering the medical profession, Fledderjohann was well regarded by other physicians; he was a member of the Northwestern Ohio Medical Association, and in 1906, he was elected to the vice presidency of the Auglaize County Medical Society. For a time, he was also a public official, acting as the health officer for the New Knoxville Board of Health in 1902. Besides serving the community as a family doctor, Fledderjohann was also an inventor; he was granted a patent for a type of steam turbine in 1913.

== Buildings ==
Fledderjohann's house was built in 1879 by Gustave Zuelch, Fledderjohann's predecessor as community doctor; he served the village from 1878 to 1888. Located adjacent to the house is the doctors office. Built in 1890, the office is a one-story brick building with small rounded windows that open into the attic. The kitchen is a one-story frame structure located immediately behind the house. These three buildings were listed together on the National Register of Historic Places in 1993, primarily because of their connection to Fledderjohann. Today, Fledderjohann's property is operated as a museum by the New Knoxville Historical Society, with his residence as a historic house museum. Besides the three landmarked buildings, the museum complex includes a barn, a barber shop and a small log house.
