= Way Productions =

Way Productions is a group of musicians affiliated with The Way International. The lyrics to their songs are based on the Bible and practical application of it. They perform every Sunday afternoon at The Way's headquarters in New Knoxville, Ohio, for the Way's Sunday teaching services. They also perform at special events put on at various times throughout the year.

== Musical styles ==
- Gospel
- Rock and Roll
- Rock
- Soul
- Country/Western
- Jazz
- Blues
- Funk
- Classic R&B and modern R&B
- Dance oriented music
- Salsa
- Disco

== Musical Groups ==
=== Official ===
- Singing Ladies of the Way
- The Present Truth

=== Unofficial or former ===
- Fellow Workers With God
- High Country Trio
- Hope
- Joyful Noise
- Pressed Down, Shaken Together and Running Over
- Sing it Dave
- Selah (from the 1970s)
- The Victors
- Agape (UK)
- Takit
- Acts 29
- CORE
- Ted Ferrell
- Age of Grace
- Branded
- Jordan River Ramblers
- New Horizons
- Breakthrough
- Lakeview Telecasters
- Good Seed
- Bob Stanley

== Music titles ==
=== Some CD albums ===
- Thank You, Dorothy—Thank You, Rhoda (1985)
- Fellow Workers with God (1989)
- Word Over the World Singing Ladies of The Way (1991)
- Sing It, Dave (1992)
- Movin'It! The Singing Ladies of The Way (1993)
- The Way of Abundance and Power Singing Ladies of the Way(1996)
- Thank You Gentlemen (1997)
- The Prevailing Word in Music (1998)
- Living as Disciples (1999)
- Sound in the Fundamentals of Prevailing (2000)
- Jesus Christ: The Way, The Truth, The Life (2001)
- The Future Is Bright (2002)
- Moving Ahead (2003)
- Quiet Seas (2003)
- Valiant for the Truth: The Present Truth (2004)
- Walking with the Father (2005)
- Living in the Light of the Word (2006)
- Stepping Out on the Truth (2008)
- Simple & Sweet (2009)
- Giving of Our Abundance (2010)
- Power and Light (2011)
- For the Glory of God (2012)
- Let Your Light Shine (2013)
- Oh, What a Life I Live! (2014)
- We Are God's Holy Habitation (2015)
- Words to Live and Give (2016)
- Jesus Christ Our Promised Seed (2018)
- Children's Sing Along The Way (2018)
- Lighting The Way with Song (2019)
- Think On These Things (2020)
- In Him We Thrive (2021)
- Wake the World! (2022)
- Held By The Truth (2023)

=== Some songs ===
- The Promised Land of the Prevailing Word (Rock, 1998)
- The Present Truth (Blues, 1998, 2004)
- Biblical Solutions (Soul, 2006)
- There's A Harvest There (Jazz, 2006)
- Our Power for Abundant Living (Funk, 2008)
- Living Today for the Hope (Disco, 2012)
