= American Christian Press =

American Christian Press serves as the publishing arm of The Way International Biblical research, teaching and fellowship ministry, operating out of New Knoxville, Ohio.

== Ongoing publications ==
- The Way Magazine, published bi-monthly. Editor: Keith W. Jackson.

== Published works ==
=== Wierwille, Victor Paul. ===
- (1971) Power for Abundant Living (1st Ed). ISBN 0-910068-01-1
- (1971) Christians Should Be Prosperous (1st Ed). ISBN 0-910068-65-8
- (1972) Receiving the Holy Spirit Today (7th Ed). ISBN 0-910068-49-6
- (1975) Jesus Christ is Not God (2nd Ed). ISBN 0-910068-33-X
- (1980) Jesus Christ Our Passover (2nd Ed). ISBN 0-910068-30-5
- (1982) Jesus Christ Our Promised Seed (1st Ed). ISBN 0-910068-42-9
- (1982) Are the Dead Alive Now? (2nd Ed). ISBN 0-910068-40-2
- (1971) Studies in Abundant Living Series Vol I - The Bible Tells Me So (1st Ed). ISBN 0-910068-10-0
- (1971) Studies in Abundant Living Series Vol II - The New Dynamic Church (1st Ed). ISBN 0-910068-11-9
- (1971) Studies in Abundant Living Series Vol III - The Words Way (1st Ed). ISBN 0-910068-12-7
- (1977) Studies in Abundant Living Series Vol IV - God's Magnified Word (1st Ed). ISBN 0-910068-13-5
- (1985) Studies in Abundant Living Series Vol V - Order My Steps in Thy Word (1st Ed). ISBN 0-910068-59-3

=== Martindale, L. Craig. ===
- (1990) Teaching God's Word to Children. ISBN 0-910068-71-2
- (1993) The Rise and Expansion of the Christian Church in the First Century. ISBN 0-910068-78-X

=== Other Authors ===
- (1972) The Way: Living in Love by Elena S. Whiteside ISBN 0-910068-04-6
- (1978) Uncle Harry An Autobiography by Karen Martin Wierwille. ISBN 0-910068-15-1
- (1980) Will The Real You Please Stand Up by John A. Lynn. ISBN 0-910068-28-3
- (1981) Will The Real You Please Remain Standing by John A. Lynn. ISBN 0-910068-38-0
- (1981) The Living Word Speaks Studies in Biblical Research, Teaching, and Fellowship by Walter J. Cummins ISBN 0-910068-39-9
- (1983) Living in the Eye of the Storm by John A. Lynn. ISBN 0-910068-50-X
- (1983) God's Word in Culture by Elena S. Whiteside. ISBN 0-910068-51-8
- (1984) Outreach Strategies of Jesus Christ. (2nd Ed) ISBN 1-933283-01-7
- (1985) Studies in Biblical Accuracy Vol I - Demonstrating God's Power by Walter J. Cummins. ISBN 0-910068-60-7
- (1985) Life Lines Quotations of Victor Paul Wierwille. ISBN 0-910068-64-X
- (1996) Born Again to Serve by Dorothea Kipp Wierwille. ISBN 0-910068-79-8
- (1997) The Way International: Where God's Word Prevails. ISBN 0-910068-80-1
- (2000) Sing Along The Way. ISBN 1-933283-00-9
- (2001) Just The Way It Was by Dorothy Owens. ISBN 0-910068-89-5
- (2005) What God's Word Says about Angels. ISBN 0-910068-96-8
- (2009) On the Trail of Manners and Customs of the Bible by Bernita Jess. ISBN 1-933283-04-1

=== Aramaic New Testament Publications ===
- (1983) The Aramaic New Testament ISBN 0-910068-47-X
- (1985) The Concordance to the Peshitta Version of the Aramaic New Testament ISBN 0-910068-61-5
- (1985) The English Dictionary Supplement to the Concordance to the Peshitta Version of the Aramaic New Testament ISBN 0-910068-67-4
- (1988) Aramaic-English Interlinear New Testament
  - Volume 1 (Matthew-John) ISBN 0-910068-73-9
  - Volume 2 (Acts-Philemon) ISBN 0-910068-74-7
  - Volume 3 (Hebrews-Revelation) ISBN 0-910068-75-5

=== Reprints by The Way International ===
==== K.C. Pillai ====
- (1984) Orientalisms of the Bible. ISBN 0-910068-70-4
- (1987) Light Through an Eastern Window. ISBN 0-910068-63-1

==== E.W. Bullinger ====
- (1983) How to Enjoy the Bible. ISBN 0-910068-48-8

==== Other Authors ====
- (1994) Lexicon to the Syriac New Testament by William Jennings. ISBN 0-910068-69-0

==== Studies in Abundant Living Series ====
Studies in Abundant Living, Vols I - V are each a compilation of previously published pamphlets, Way Magazine articles or transcriptions of teachings. Some chapters are repeated, sometimes in expanded form in other books. At times these books, as well as Power for Abundant Living, Receiving the Holy Spirit Today and Christians Should Be Prosperous were included as part of the package with The Way's foundational class.

== European Christian Press ==
European Christian Press was the publishing arm of The Way in Great Britain Ltd., which was at one time associated with The Way International. They published several books of collected teachings of Way founder VP Wierwille, edited by Christopher Geer.

- (1987) Living Victoriously. ISBN 1-870676-00-9
- (1987) Take God At His Word. ISBN 1-870676-05-X
- (1989) We are His - He is Ours: The Honesty of Leadership. ISBN 1-870676-25-4
- (1990) Our Times (Collection of editorials and short articles originally printed in The Way Magazine) ISBN 1-870676-30-0
- (1990) Turn Your Eyes Upon Jesus. ISBN 1-870676-35-1
- (1993) Take A Stand For God. ISBN 1-870676-40-8
