= Lamsa Bible =

English translation of the Syriac Bible

The Holy Bible from Ancient Eastern Manuscripts (commonly called the Lamsa Bible) was published by George M. Lamsa in 1933. It was derived, both Old and New Testaments, from the Syriac Peshitta, the Bible used by the Assyrian Church of the East and other Syriac Christian traditions.

Lamsa, following the tradition of his church, claimed that the Aramaic New Testament was written before the Greek version, a view known as Aramaic primacy. This contrasts with the academic consensus that the language of the New Testament was Greek. Lamsa thus claimed his translation was superior to versions based on later Greek manuscripts. While Lamsa's claims are rejected by the academic community, his translation remains the best known Aramaic to English translation of the New Testament.

== Textual differences between Peshitta and Greek manuscripts ==
Some places in Lamsa's translation differ from the Greek texts used as the basis of other English-language Bibles.

=== Matthew 27:46 ===
An example is found in Matthew Matthew 27:46, where Lamsa has "My God, my God, for this I was spared!" where the Greek text has "My God, my God why hast thou forsaken me?"

And about the ninth hour
Jesus cried with a loud voice, saying,
Eli, Eli, lama sabachthani?
that is to say,
My God, my God, why hast thou forsaken me?

This is rendered in Lamsa's translation:

And about the ninth hour,
Jesus cried out with a loud voice and said,
Eli, Eli lemana shabakthan!
My God, my God, for this I was spared!

Though in fact the Peshitta does not have four lines in this verse. The 1905 United Bible Societies edition by George Gwilliam of the Peshitta in Syriac contains only three lines, the Aramaic "Eli, Eli,.. " (ܐܝܠ ܐܝܠ) etc. not being given twice:

ܘܠܐܦ̈ܝ ܬܫܥ ܫܥ̈ܝܢ
ܩܥܐ ܝܫܘܥ ܒܩܠܐ ܪܡܐ ܘܐܡܪ
ܐܝܠ ܐܝܠ ܠܡܢܐ ܫܒܩܬܢܝ

This verse in Greek manuscripts states that from the Cross, Jesus (quoting Psalm 22:1) cried out, 'My God, My God, why hast Thou forsaken Me?' (See Matthew 27:46) proponents of the priority of the Aramaic New Testament such as George Lamsa claim this verse is a mistranslation into Greek.

=== Matthew 19:24 ===
Some scholars of the Peshitta and the Greek New Testament claim that in Matthew 19:24 as the Aramaic word for 'camel' is written identically to the word for 'rope,' an error occurred due to the translator's limitations when the original scrolls were being transferred into Greek. This would mean Matthew 19:24 commonly translated as, 'It is easier for a camel to go through the eye of a needle than for a rich man to enter into the Kingdom of God.' Would read 'rope' instead of 'camel'. To support this they claim that rope, is much more in keeping with the imagery of a needle, and that it is probably what Jesus said, and what was originally recorded. Saint Cyril in his commentary on the Holy Gospel according to Luke (Luke 18:25) says that camel is the term used by those versed in navigation for a thick rope, thereby both stating that the term camel is the right one and that its meaning is that of a rope and not the animal. This suggests the Lamsa 'rope' translation is the more accurate "meaning" translation and 'camel' is the more accurate 1st century "slang" translation.
