= Aramaic New Testament hypotheses =

Belief that the Christian New Testament was originally written in Aramaic

Aramaic New Testament hypotheses are a number of hypotheses within Biblical scholarship which argue that the Christian New Testament derives in some form from an Aramaic original. A first version was initially advanced in the 17th and 18th centuries, arguing that all Gospels and Acts could derive from one Aramaic proto-Gospel. Subsequent current-day hypotheses trying to better establish this earlier hypothesis argue usually that some parts of the Gospels could derive from an Aramaic sayings-source. In current scholarship they enjoy no notable support compared to the consensus hypothesis that the New Testament was written in Koine Greek.

They are related to and often overlap with the Hebrew Gospel hypothesis, which posits a similar idea but with Hebrew instead of Aramaic.

== Greek original New Testament hypothesis ==
The current consensus view held by almost all scholars of the New Testament is that all of its contents were originally written in Koine Greek.

An example of how mainstream scholars have dealt with Aramaic influences within an overall view of the Gospels' original Greek-language development may be found in Martin Hengel's synthesis of studies of the linguistic situation in Palestine during the time of Jesus and the Gospels:

Since non-literary, simple Greek knowledge or competency in multiple languages was relatively widespread in Jewish Palestine including Galilee, and a Greek-speaking community had already developed in Jerusalem shortly after Easter, one can assume that this linguistic transformation [from "the Aramaic native language of Jesus" to "the Greek Gospels"] began very early. ... [M]issionaries, above all 'Hellenists' driven out of Jerusalem, soon preached their message in the Greek language. We find them in Damascus as early as AD 32 or 33. A certain percentage of Jesus' earliest followers were presumably bilingual and could therefore report, at least in simple Greek, what had been heard and seen. This probably applies to Cephas/Peter, Andrew, Philip or John. Mark, too, who was better educated in Jerusalem than the Galilean fishermen, belonged to this milieu. The great number of phonetically correct Aramaisms and his knowledge of the conditions in Jewish Palestine compel us to assume a Palestinian Jewish-Christian author. Also, the author's Aramaic native language is still discernible in the Marcan style.

== Aramaic original New Testament hypotheses ==
The hypothesis that the New Testament could have been written in Aramaic, the language of Jesus, and then translated to Greek is rejected by the majority of modern scholars.

The French priest Richard Simon in 1689 initially asserted that an Aramaic or Hebrew Gospel of Matthew lay behind the Nazarene Gospel, and thus served as the Proto-Gospel. A more extensive version of this theory claiming solely an Aramaic Proto-Gospel was first proposed by Gotthold Ephraim Lessing in 1784. It was expounded on by Johann Gottfried Eichhorn, who in 1804 provided a comprehensive basis for the Proto-Gospel hypothesis and argued for an Aramaic original gospel that each of the Synoptic evangelists had in a different intermediate form.

In 1887 John Hancock Pettingell, in spite of the now-established view of Greek originals, argued that some texts of the New Testament such as "the Gospel of Matthew, the Epistles to the Hebrews" might have been written "in the vernacular Syriac of the Jews". Some 19th-century scholars believe the place names in the Peshitta New Testament indicate it was written by someone with independent knowledge of Aramaic place names in Palestine mentioned in the Greek New Testament.

Throughout the 20th century Matthew Black tried to advance Lessing's hypothesis further, but only was able to establish with some degree of certainty that some parts of the Gospel of Mark could derive from an Aramaic sayings-source or tradition. His work was heavily critiqued for its methodology. It is republished today with a critical preface lauding it as the "highmark" of an older theory, but describing consequent developments in scholarship.

The 20th-century scholar Charles Cutler Torrey held to a view that the Gospels were composed in Aramaic. He also argued in a posthumous publication that the Greek in the Book of Revelation was so bad that it might be indicative of having been composed in Aramaic.

The 20th-century Vetus Syra translator E. Jan Wilson believed that Luke was written "in the Syriac dialect of Antioch", that Matthew also might be an Aramaic composition, that Mark was unlikely to be Aramaic and that John could not have been written in Aramaic. Fellow 20th-century translator George Lamsa advocated for a similar Syriac-based theory asserting a "Peshitta-original" in his translation of his Peshitta New Testament. However, his work is poorly regarded by most scholars in the field.

The common response by scholars in the field of New Testament studies to these theories is expressed by Sebastian Brock:

The only complete English translation of the Peshitta is by G. Lamsa. This is unfortunately not always very accurate, and his claims that the Peshitta Gospels represent the Aramaic original underlying the Greek Gospels are entirely without foundation; such views, which are not infrequently found in more popular literature, are rejected by all serious scholars.

== Outside of academia ==
At times leaders of the Assyrian Church of the East express the belief that the entire Syriac Peshitta New Testament in liturgical use by them is the original of the New Testament. However, almost all modern scholars view its Old Testament as a 2nd-century translation from Hebrew and its New Testament as a 5th-century translation from Greek.

Claims exalting Aramaic in such ways are directly connected to the emergence and current expression of Assyrian nationalism. Similar beliefs are present in various Messianic Jewish groups.

== See also ==
- List of English Bible translations#Modern Aramaic to English translations
