= K. C. Sreedharan Pillai =

Indian-American mathematician

K C Sreedharan Pillai
- Born: 1920; Travancore, British India (present-day Kerala, India)
- Died: 5 June 1985 (aged 64–65); Lafayette, Indiana, U.S.
- Education: University of Kerala; University of North Carolina, Chapel Hill
- Known for: multivariate analysis
- Scientific career
- Fields: Statistics
- Workplaces: Purdue University; University of the Philippines; United Nations
- Doctoral advisor: Samarendra Roy

K. C. Sreedharan Pillai (1920–1985) was an Indian statistician who was known for his works on multivariate analysis and probability distributions.

Pillai studied at the University of Travancore in Trivandrum. He graduated in 1941 and obtained his master's degree in 1945. He was appointed a lecturer at the University of Kerala in 1945 and worked there for six years until he went to the United States in 1951. After studying for one year at Princeton University, he went to the University of North Carolina where he was awarded a doctorate in statistics in 1954.

His first post was as a statistician with the United Nations, a post he held from 1954 until 1962. One of his achievements at that post was the founding of the Statistical Center of the University of the Philippines. He was a visiting Professor and Advisor to the University of Philippines for a number of years and supervised graduate students there. In 1962 Pillai was appointed Professor of Statistics and Mathematics at Purdue University. Pillai's research was in statistics, in particular in multivariate statistical analysis. Pillai was honoured by being elected a Fellow of the American Statistical Association and a Fellow of the Institute of Mathematical Statistics. He was an elected member of the International Statistical Institute.

He was a keen golfer too.

He died on 5 June 1985 in Lafayette, Indiana, USA.
