= New Knoxville, Ohio =

- Village
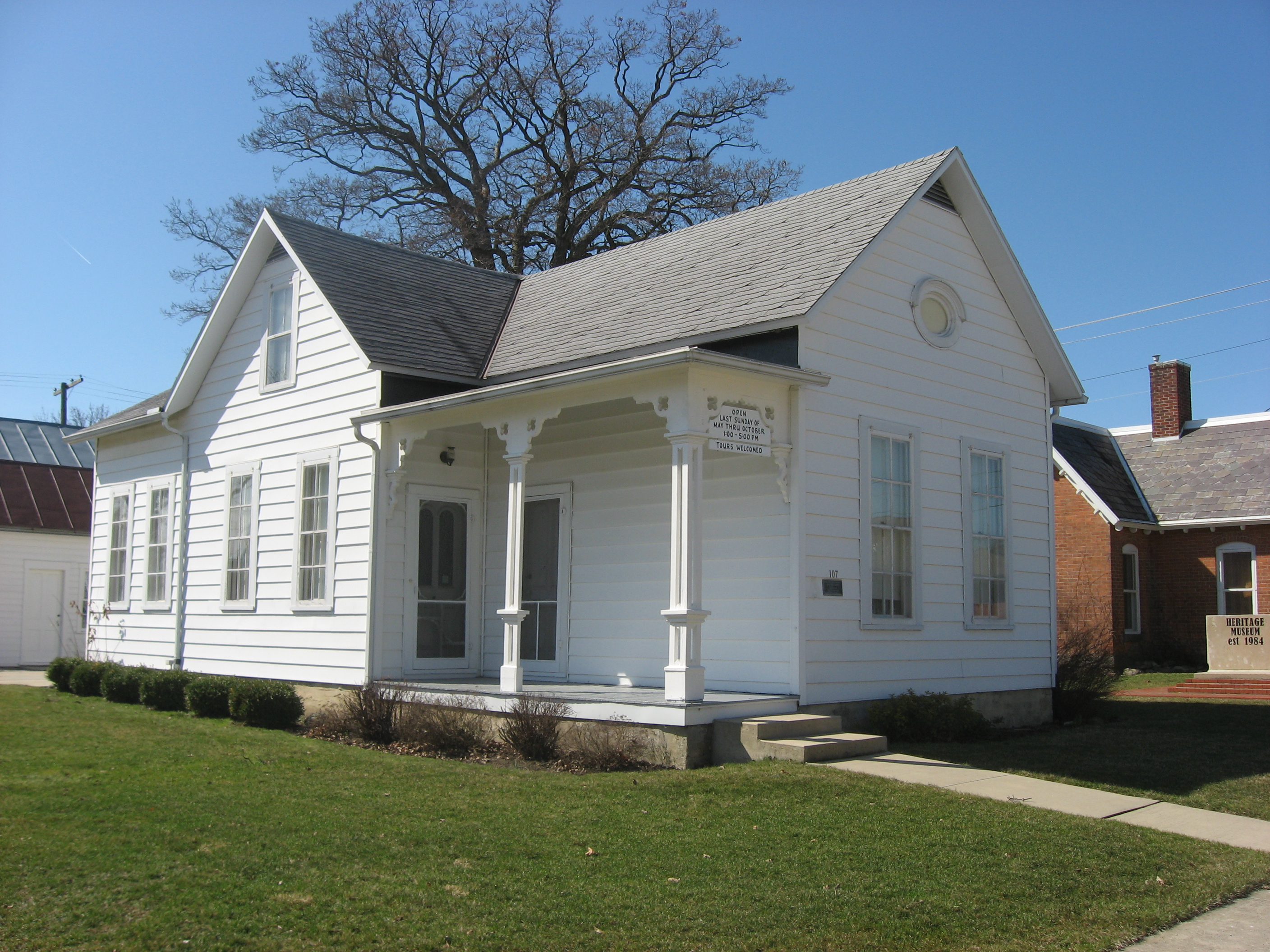
- H.E. Fledderjohann House

- Flag Logo

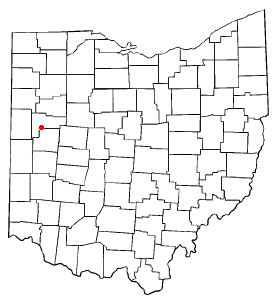
- Location of New Knoxville, Ohio

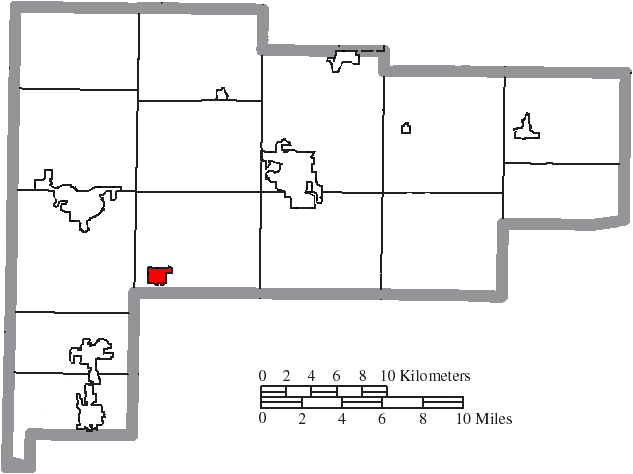
- Location of New Knoxville in Auglaize County
- Coordinates: 40°29′54″N 84°18′40″W
- Country: United States
- State: Ohio
- County: Auglaize
- Township: Washington
- Founded: 1836

Government
  - Mayor: Keith Leffel

Area
  - Total: 0.97 sq mi (2.51 km^{2})
  - Land: 0.97 sq mi (2.51 km^{2})
  - Water: 0 sq mi (0.00 km^{2})
- Elevation: 899 ft (274 m)

Population (2020)
  - Total: 946
  - Density: 977.4/sq mi (377.36/km^{2})
- Time zone: UTC-5 (Eastern (EST))
  - Summer (DST): UTC-4 (EDT)
- ZIP code: 45871
- Area code: 419
- FIPS code: 39-54838
- GNIS feature ID: 2399468
- Website: www.newknoxville.com

New Knoxville is a village in Auglaize County, Ohio, United States. It was established in 1836. The population was 946 at the 2020 census. It is included in the Wapakoneta, Ohio Micropolitan Statistical Area.

== History ==
New Knoxville was platted in 1836. A post office called New Knoxville has been in operation since 1858.

New Knoxville's community historical society maintains a historical museum in the village consisting of six buildings. Three of the buildings in the "Heritage Center Complex" are listed on the National Register of Historic Places because of their place as the home and office of Dr. H.E. Fledderjohann, a leading member of the community at the turn of the twentieth century.

== Geography ==
New Knoxville is located at 40°29′39″N 84°19′2″W (40.494233, -84.317260). According to the United States Census Bureau, the village has a total area of 0.89 square miles (2.31 km^{2}), all land.

== Demographics ==
Historical population
Census	Pop.	Note	%±
1890	514		—
1900	436		−15.2%
1910	487		11.7%
1920	537		10.3%
1930	528		−1.7%
1940	557		5.5%
1950	662		18.9%
1960	792		19.6%
1970	852		7.6%
1980	760		−10.8%
1990	838		10.3%
2000	891		6.3%
2010	879		−1.3%
2020	946		7.6%
U.S. Decennial Census

=== 2010 census ===
As of the census of 2010, there were 879 people, 355 households, and 250 families residing in the village. The population density was 987.6 inhabitants per square mile (381.3/km^{2}). There were 382 housing units at an average density of 429.2 per square mile (165.7/km^{2}). The racial makeup of the village was 98.6% White, 0.3% Native American, 0.3% from other races, and 0.7% from two or more races. Hispanic or Latino of any race were 1.3% of the population.

There were 355 households, of which 35.8% had children under the age of 18 living with them, 57.5% were married couples living together, 7.3% had a female householder with no husband present, 5.6% had a male householder with no wife present, and 29.6% were non-families. 26.5% of all households were made up of individuals, and 13.2% had someone living alone who was 65 years of age or older. The average household size was 2.48 and the average family size was 2.98.

The median age in the village was 39.4 years. 27.6% of residents were under the age of 18; 4.7% were between the ages of 18 and 24; 25% were from 25 to 44; 27.3% were from 45 to 64; and 15.4% were 65 years of age or older. The gender makeup of the village was 49.4% male and 50.6% female.

=== 2000 census ===
As of the census of 2000, there were 891 people, 348 households, and 249 families residing in the village. The population density was 1,135.4 inhabitants per square mile (438.4/km^{2}). There were 364 housing units at an average density of 463.9 per square mile (179.1/km^{2}). The racial makeup of the village was 98.54% White, 0.22% African American, 0.34% Asian, and 0.90% from two or more races. Hispanic or Latino of any race were 0.11% of the population.

There were 348 households, out of which 37.4% had children under the age of 18 living with them, 62.1% were married couples living together, 7.5% had a female householder with no husband present, and 28.4% were non-families. 26.4% of all households were made up of individuals, and 12.9% had someone living alone who was 65 years of age or older. The average household size was 2.56 and the average family size was 3.13.

In the village, the population was spread out, with 28.1% under the age of 18, 7.4% from 18 to 24, 32.4% from 25 to 44, 16.8% from 45 to 64, and 15.3% who were 65 years of age or older. The median age was 35 years. For every 100 females there were 92.0 males. For every 100 females age 18 and over, there were 92.5 males.

The median income for a household in the village was $42,375, and the median income for a family was $51,000. Males had a median income of $33,833 versus $23,750 for females. The per capita income for the village was $18,800. About 4.1% of families and 4.7% of the population were below the poverty line, including 5.4% of those under age 18 and 5.5% of those age 65 or over.

== Businesses and churches ==
New Knoxville is home to the First Church of New Knoxville [Non-Denominational] and to New Knoxville Methodist Church (formerly Salem Methodist).

Hoge Lumber is one of the largest businesses and employers in New Knoxville. Hoge Lumber is the world's largest producer of wood bowling lanes and has manufactured upward of 100,000 wood lanes.

Crown Equipment Corporation with its international headquarters and a manufacturing facility in nearby New Bremen has a motor manufacturing facility at New Knoxville and hangars their corporate jets at Auglaize County Neil Armstrong Airport at New Knoxville.

The Way International is a religious organization founded by Victor Paul Wierwille. It was founded on October 3, 1942, the year Wierwille began his Vesper Chimes radio program, a.k.a. the Chimes Hour Youth Caravan in nearby Van Wert. The Way International's headquarters, located about 2 miles (3 km) southwest of the New Knoxville village center, was formerly the Wierwille family farm.

The Auglaize County Neil Armstrong Airport is one of Ohio's finest county airports. The airport features a lighted 5650 x 100 foot runway, suitable to all types of aircraft including corporate jets.

== Education ==
The New Knoxville Local Schools system consists of a high school (New Knoxville High School), middle school, and elementary school. New Knoxville has a public library, a branch of the Auglaize County Public Library.

== Sister village ==
- Ladbergen, North Rhine-Westphalia, Germany

A lot of immigrants originating from the German village of Ladbergen settled down in the area around New Knoxville with which a town partnership was established. These immigrants became the ancestors of large numbers of residents of New Knoxville and the surrounding area, including Washington Township/Wapakoneta native Neil Armstrong. Closer relations between the two villages have been fostered by journeys by residents of both communities to the other. For the New Knoxville sesquicentennial in 1986, approximately 100 Ladbergen residents traveled to New Knoxville to join in the celebration.

New Knoxville's neighboring municipalities, Wapakoneta and Saint Marys, are sister cities with Ladbergen's neighbors Lengerich and Lienen, respectively.

== Notable people ==
- Evan Eschmeyer, professional basketball player
- Victor Paul Wierwille, Christian minister
