= George Lamsa =

Assyrian author (1892–1975)

George M. Lamsa
- Born: 5 August 1892; Mar Bishu, Ottoman Empire
- Died: 22 September 1975 (aged 83); Turlock, California
- Occupation: Biblical scholar
- Known for: The Holy Bible from Ancient Eastern Manuscripts

George Mamishisho Lamsa (Syriac: ܓܝܘܪܓܝܣ ܠܡܣܐ) (August 5, 1892 – September 22, 1975) was an Assyrian author. He was born in Mar Bishu in what is now the extreme east of Turkey. A native Aramaic speaker, he translated the Aramaic Peshitta Old and New Testaments into English. He popularized the claim of the Assyrian Church of the East that the New Testament was written in Aramaic and then translated into Greek, contrary to academic consensus.

== Life ==
Lamsa fled from the Ottoman Empire during the 1910s during World War I, initially settling in South America. In the 1920s, he immigrated to the United States, where he lived for the rest of his life. He studied at the Episcopal Theological Seminary in Alexandria, Virginia and at Dropsie College in Philadelphia, Pennsylvania. On September 22, 1975, he died in Turlock, California.

== History and views ==
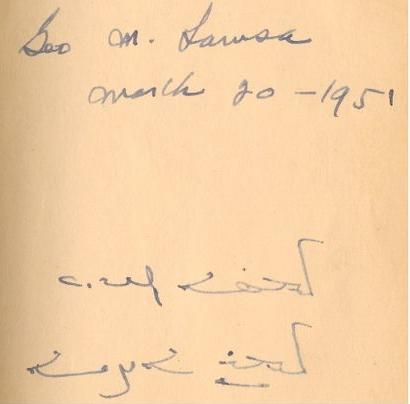
Signature of George Lamsa

Lamsa was a member of the Assyrian Church of the East, a Syriac church that uses the Peshitta as its Bible. Some of the modern Assyrian people speak a modern form of the classical Syriac language called Northeastern Neo-Aramaic. The Peshitta was written in classical Syriac, a dialect of Middle Aramaic, which is in turn a Semitic language. The language spoken in the first century would have been Old Aramaic, like the Judeo-Aramaic language, while Ancient Aramaic like Biblical Aramaic was used in Old Testament times.

Lamsa was a strong advocate of a belief traditionally held by part of that Church; that the Aramaic New Testament of the Peshitta was the original source text, and that the Greek texts were translated from it. According to Lamsa, "Aramaic was the colloquial and literary language of Palestine, Syria, Asia Minor and Mesopotamia, from the fourth century B. C. to the ninth century A. D." This view of the Assyrian Church regarding the Language of the New Testament is rejected by mainstream scholarship, but Lamsa's views won support among some churches such as The Way.

Lamsa further claimed that while most of the Old Testament was written in Hebrew, the original was lost and the present Hebrew version, the Masoretic Text, was re-translated from the Peshitta.

Lamsa produced his own translation of the Bible in the form of The Holy Bible from Ancient Eastern Manuscripts, which is commonly called the Lamsa Bible.

=== Translation of Matthew 19:24 with the word 'rope', instead of 'camel' ===
According to Lamsa, the Aramaic word for 'camel' is written similarly to the word for 'rope.' Matthew 19:24, according to Lamsa, is correctly translated as, 'It is easier for a rope to go through the eye of a needle than for a rich man to enter into the Kingdom of God.'

=== Translation of Eli, Eli, lama sabachthani ===
A notable difference between Lamsa's translation and other versions of the New Testament occurs in the fourth of the Words of Jesus on the cross – Eli, Eli, lama sabachthani. That is regarded by more conservative scholars as a quotation in Aramaic of the opening of Psalm 22, which in English is "My God, my God, why have you forsaken me?" It is similar to how the psalm appears in the Aramaic Peshitta Old Testament and it appears in earlier Aramaic Targums. Lamsa believed that the text of the Gospels was corrupt and that it is not a quotation but should read /Eli, Eli, lemana shabaqthani, which he translates as: "My God, my God, for this I was spared!" An accompanying footnote in Lamsa's English version of the Bible says Jesus's meaning was "This was my destiny."

Aramaic grammars and dictionaries, including CAL and Payne Smith, disagree with Lamsa's assertion about Jesus' last words, as the word שבקתני [shvaqtani] in Aramaic is the perfect 2nd person singular form of the verb שבק [shvaq] which means "to leave, to leave s.t. left over, to abandon," or "to permit" with the 1st person singular pronoun affixed. That would, in turn, cause the phrase to translate as "why have you left me?" "why have you let me be?" "why have you abandoned me?" or "why have you permitted me?"

== Reception ==
Where many scholars hold that the sources of the New Testament and early oral traditions of fledgling Christianity were indeed in Aramaic, the Peshitta appears to have been strongly influenced by the Byzantine reading of the Greek manuscript tradition and is in a dialect of Syriac that is much younger than the one that was contemporary to Jesus.

Critics of Lamsa assert that he, like many other native Aramaic-speakers, extend the semantic areas of words beyond the evidence of existent texts.

Bruce Chilton, scholar and prominent Aramaist, has said:

"A still less defensible tendency confuses Aramaic of the first century with Syriac, a different form of the language. The approach of George Lamsa, who used the Peshitta Syriac version as an index of replicating Jesus’ teaching in Aramaic, has been taken up and popularized by Neil Douglas-Klotz. This approach willfully perpetuates a basic confusion of language, since Aramaic and Syriac come from different centuries and areas (although they are closely related Semitic languages), and is based on uncritical treatment of the Peshitta, a Syriac version of the Gospels."

Neil Douglas-Klotz, former chair of the Mysticism Group of the American Academy of Religion, defends Lamsa and points out that the differences between the 1C Palestinian Aramaic and the Syriac of the Peshitta are minimal concerning the roots of the key words that Jesus must have used:

"Aramaic Christians of all branches today use the version called the Peshitta, meaning “simple” or “straight.” It is in an Aramaic dialect called Syriac; however, all the major words that Jesus must have used are the same in his slightly earlier Palestinian Aramaic."

In 1989, the Christian Evangelical apologetics research ministry Christian Research Institute asserted in a published review that several of Lamsa's theological positions and interpretations were not supported by the Bible. The review concludes by saying:

"On the surface, Lamsa appears to be a revealer of biblical truth and culture and a friend of evangelical Christianity. Closer study, however, has revealed that Lamsa promotes metaphysical, not evangelical teachings which have led him to inaccurate interpretations and translations of portions of the Bible. As an ambassador of Nestorian, not biblical culture, Lamsa became a cultic figure in his own right."

Neil Douglas-Klotz makes the case that one needs to take into account both the way of knowing (epistemology) and psychology of ancient Semitic languages in order to properly interpret the words of a prophetic figure:

"In ancient times, people knew everything by its context. They heard practical things in a practical way. They heard the words of a prophet or shaman on many possible levels if they had “ears to hear.” The ancient Semitic languages suited themselves to this multi-levelled understanding. They employ a root-and-pattern system in which individual letters and sounds each have meaning and then combine with one another to create new meanings.... Later, Semitic grammar developed, and grammarians began to limit the basic root of meaning into set combinations of two or three letters. The ancient Semitic way was freer and more open; individual letters combined and recombined like notes in a jazz suite. From this creative process arises the multi-levelled translation and rendering of sacred texts called midrash in the early Jewish tradition, and ta’wil in the Islamic one."

William M. Branham, evangelist and personal friend to Lamsa has said:

"To our gratification we find the words in both amazingly the same so that there is no difference actually in content or doctrine. We may even conclude that God has allowed these newly discovered manuscripts and recent publications of already known scripts to come before us to prove the authenticity of what we already had. And we find that though translators may fight each other, scripts do not."

Edwin Yamauchi was particularly critical of Lamsa's adherence to Assyrian Church traditions about the Peshitta, in particular since the Peshitta is written in a later eastern dialect of Aramaic removed from the western dialect spoken in Judea at the time of Jesus.

It is in fact Lamsa’s faith in the dogma of the Assyrian Church of Iraq which he grandiosely calls “the Church of the East” which serves as the basis of his conviction in the superiority of the Syriac Peshitta Version…. The Syriac of the Peshitta is not the language of coastal Syria around Antioch, which was evangelized in the first century A.D., but of the area in the interior around Edessa, one hundred fifty miles from the coast, which was evangelized between A.D. 116 and 216…. No one but an unquestioning adherent of “The Church of the East” would subscribe to the legendary account of the apostolic roots of the Edessene church. In the light of the claims advanced by Lamsa for Syriac, it should be underlined that Syriac is an eastern and not a western dialect of Aramaic, and indeed that it is “a form of Aramaic that emerges toward the beginning of the third century A.D.”

== Works ==
- Life in the Harem. Washington, D.C: [s.n.], 1921.
- The Secret of the Near East: Slavery of Women, Social, Religious and Economic Life in the Near East. Philadelphia, PA: Ideal Pr., 1923.
- Emhardt, William Chauncey, and George Mamishisho Lamsa. The Oldest Christian People: A Brief Account of the History and Traditions of the Assyrian People and the Fateful History of the Nestorian Church. NY: Macmillan, 1926.
- Did 'the Jews' Kill Jesus? NY:[s.n.], 1930.
- Key to Original Gospels. Philadelphia, Pa: John C. Winston Co, 1931.
- My Neighbor Jesus: In the Light of His Own Language, People, and Time. St. Petersburg Beach, Fla: Aramaic Bible Soc., 1932.
- The Four Gospels According to the Eastern Version. Philadelphia: A.J. Holman, 1933.
- Gospel Light: Comments on the Teachings of Jesus from Aramaic and Unchanged Eastern Customs. Philadelphia: A.J. Holman, 1936.
- The Book of Psalms, According to the Eastern Version. Philadelphia: A.J. Holman, 1939.
- Modern Wisdom. New York: Association Pr., 1939.
- The Shepherd of All: The Twenty-Third Psalm. Philadelphia, Pa: A.J. Holman, 1939.
- Josephus and the Greek Language. New York: [s.n.], 1940.
- The New Testament According to the Eastern Text: Translated from Original Aramaic Sources. Philadelphia: A.J. Holman, 1940.
- Second Reader in Aramaic. Philadelphia: [s.n.], 1942.
- New Testament Commentary from the Aramaic and the Ancient Eastern Customs. Philadelphia: A.J. Holman, 1945.
- New Testament Origin. Chicago: Ziff-Davis, 1947.
- The Short Koran, Designed for Easy Reading. Chicago: Ziff-Davis, 1949.
- The Holy Bible from Ancient Eastern Manuscripts: Containing the Old and New Testaments. Philadelphia: [s.n.], 1957.
- Was Jesus an Essene? A Comparative Study of Jesus and the Prophets; a New Light on the Hidden Years. Pontiac, Mich: Charles R. Hocklin, 1959.
- A Brief Course in the Aramaic Language. [s.n.], 1960.
- Old Testament Light: A Scriptural Commentary Based on the Aramaic of the Ancient Peshitta Text. Englewood Cliffs, N.J: Prentice-Hall, 1964.
- Gems of Wisdom. Lee's Summit, Mo: [Unity School of Christianity], 1966.
- The Kingdom on Earth. Lee's Summit, Mo: Unity Books [distrib. Hawthorn, NY], 1966.
- The Shepherd of All: The Twenty-Third Psalm. San Antonio, Tex: Aramaic Bible Center, 1966.
- And the Scroll Opened. Garden City, N.Y: Doubleday, 1967.
- More Light on the Gospel: Over 400 New Testament Passages Explained. Garden City, N.Y: Doubleday, 1968.
- The Hidden Years of Jesus. Lee's Summit, MO: Unity Books, 1968.
- The Man from Galilee; A Life of Jesus. Garden City, N.Y: Doubleday, 1970.
- Roses of Gulistan. St. Petersburg Beach, Fla: Aramaic Bible Society, 1972.
- Old Testament Light: A Scriptural Commentary Based on the Aramaic of the Ancient Peshitta Text. Philadelphia: Holman, 1978.
- Pearls of Wisdom. Marina del Rey, Calif: De Vorss, 1978.
- Idioms in the Bible Explained; and, A Key to the Original Gospel. San Francisco, CA: Harper & Row, 1985.
- The Holy Bible from the Ancient Eastern Text: George M. Lamsa's Translations from the Aramaic of the Peshitta. San Francisco: Harper & Row, 1985.
- New Testament Light: More Light on the Gospels, Acts, the Epistles, and Revelation: Over 400 Passages Explained. San Francisco: Harper & Row, 1988.
- The Modern New Testament from Aramaic. Marina del Rey, CA: DeVorss, 1998.
- Lamsa, George Mamishisho, and Daniel Jon Mahar. The Deluxe Study Edition of The Modern New Testament from the Aramaic: With New Testament Origin, Comparative Bible Verses, & a Compact English-Aramaic Concordance. Martinez, GA: Aramaic Bible Soc., 2001.

Biographical works

- Lamsa, George Mamishisho, and Tom Alyea. The Life of George M. Lamsa, Translator. St. Petersburg, Fla: Aramaic Bible Soc., 1966.

== See also ==
- Lamsa Bible
- Language of Jesus
- Nestorianism
- Words of Jesus on the cross, section "Eli Eli lema sabachthani"
