= Neil Armstrong Airport =

Airport in Ohio, United States of America

Auglaize County Neil Armstrong Airport
- IATA: AXV; ICAO: KAXV; FAA LID: AXV

Summary
- Airport type: Public
- Owner: Auglaize County Airport Authority
- Serves: Wapakoneta, Ohio
- Opened: 1956
- Elevation AMSL: 912 ft (278 m)
- Coordinates: 40°29′37″N 084°17′53″W
- Website: www.neilarmstrongairport.com

Map
- Location of airport in Ohio AXV (the United States)

Runways
Direction	Length		Surface
Direction	ft	m	Surface
08/26	5,500	1,676	Asphalt

Statistics (2021)
- Aircraft operations (year ending 9/14/2021): 12,306
- Based aircraft: 34
- Source: Federal Aviation Administration

Auglaize County Neil Armstrong Airport (IATA: AXV, ICAO: KAXV, FAA LID: AXV) is a public use airport located in New Knoxville, Ohio, eight nautical miles (9 mi, 15 km) southwest of the central business district of Wapakoneta, Ohio. It is owned by the Auglaize County Airport Authority. This airport is included in the National Plan of Integrated Airport Systems for 2019–2023, which categorizes it as a general aviation facility.

Nearby Wapakoneta is the birthplace of Neil Armstrong, aviator, astronaut and first person to walk on the Moon. The airport engages in education programs for young locals.

== History ==
N.K. Airport, Inc. was incorporated in June 1955 and began purchasing land for an airport east of New Knoxville. Construction of a hangar was underway in April 1959, with plans for runway lighting to follow.

Plans for the Neil Armstrong Airport were announced on 13 April 1966 by Governor Jim Rhodes during a homecoming event for Neil Armstrong following Gemini 8. Fundraising efforts began two months later. After the airport authority initially selected a site, it was informed in late October that the site would be unsuitable due to the proximity of a nearby cable television tower. A new slightly more than 80-acre (32 ha) site, the location of the New Knoxville Airport, was selected in December and a groundbreaking for the 4,000-foot (1,200 m) runway was held in late July 1967. The airport was dedicated on October 8th.

A proposal to build an administration building was delayed after no bids under the $50,000 amount made available by the state were submitted. It was a further setback for the airport, after airline service was ended approximately two months before. However, construction of the building was underway in February 1971. The decision in a lawsuit attempting to evict VIP Aviation, the fixed-base operator, for insufficient insurance was overturned on appeal in July 1975. A hangar for the Crown Corporation had been completed by late February 1977. After eight years in the position, the airport manager, Mickey Pierce, was fired in January 1979 due to claims of poor management from the county commissioners. Pierce, in a lawsuit that he lost prior to his removal, alleged that he was targeted because he called out a purported conflict of interest with the Crown Corporation. A 1,000-foot (300 m) runway extension and 860-foot (260 m) parallel taxiway were dedicated on 20 November 1979. A proposal for a new 4,288 sq ft (398.4 m^{2}) t-hangar was accepted and an underground fuel system was installed in 1982 and 1983, respectively.

The county purchased about 6 acres (2.4 ha) of land from a local farmer in August 1989. Work to lengthen the taxiway by 1,540 feet (470 m) had begun by early November 1994. The county purchased just over 1.7 acres (0.69 ha) of land to improve safety in August 1995. A plan to purchase an Airport Remote Radio Access System for the airport was announced in May 1998. Construction of a 13,750 sq ft (1,277 m^{2}) t-hangar was completed in April 2000. A project in 2004 lengthened the runway 500 feet (150 m) and extended a taxiway. Gary Katterheinrich, who had managed the airport since 1978, retired in summer 2007.

A project to improve the drainage at the airport was approved in January 2018. A new 4,700 sq ft (440 m^{2}) terminal building was built at the airport in 2020. In 2024, the airport was host to nearly 90 aircraft who arrived to view a total solar eclipse. A jet engine from a Learjet 28 tested by Neil Armstrong was loaned to the airport in August 2025.

== Facilities and aircraft ==
Auglaize County Neil Armstrong Airport covers an area of 140 acres (57 ha) at an elevation of 912 feet (278 m) above mean sea level. It has one runway, Runway 08/26, which is 5,500 by 100 feet (1,676 x 30 m) with an asphalt surface.

The airport has a fixed-base operator that sells both avgas and jet fuel. The facility offers services such as general maintenance, catering, and courtesy transportation; it also has amenities such as internet, conference rooms, a crew lounge, snooze rooms, showers, and more.

For the 12-month period ending September 14, 2021, the airport had 12,306 aircraft operations, an average of 34 per day: 85% general aviation, 15% air taxi, and <1% military. At that time there were 34 aircraft based at this airport: 28 single-engine airplanes, 5 jets, and 1 multi-engine airplane.

== Accidents and incidents ==
- On 24 July 1975, a twin-engine Beechcraft made an emergency landing in a field after taking off from the airport.
- On March 8, 2014, a Cessna 310 experienced a fire in the nose compartment while taxiing at the Neil Armstrong Airport. The preceding flight was uneventful. After shutting down and exiting the airplane, the pilot said he could hear fire in the nose and noticed discolored paint on the nose compartment; he subsequently removed the nose access panel and extinguished the fire with a carbon dioxide fire extinguisher. The probable cause of the incident was found to be a fire due to a fuel leak of the cabin heater system; contributing to the accident was the inadequate maintenance of the airplane, which failed to identify leaks in the heater system.

== See also ==
- List of airports in Ohio
