= Jesus and the rich young man =

Episode in the New Testament

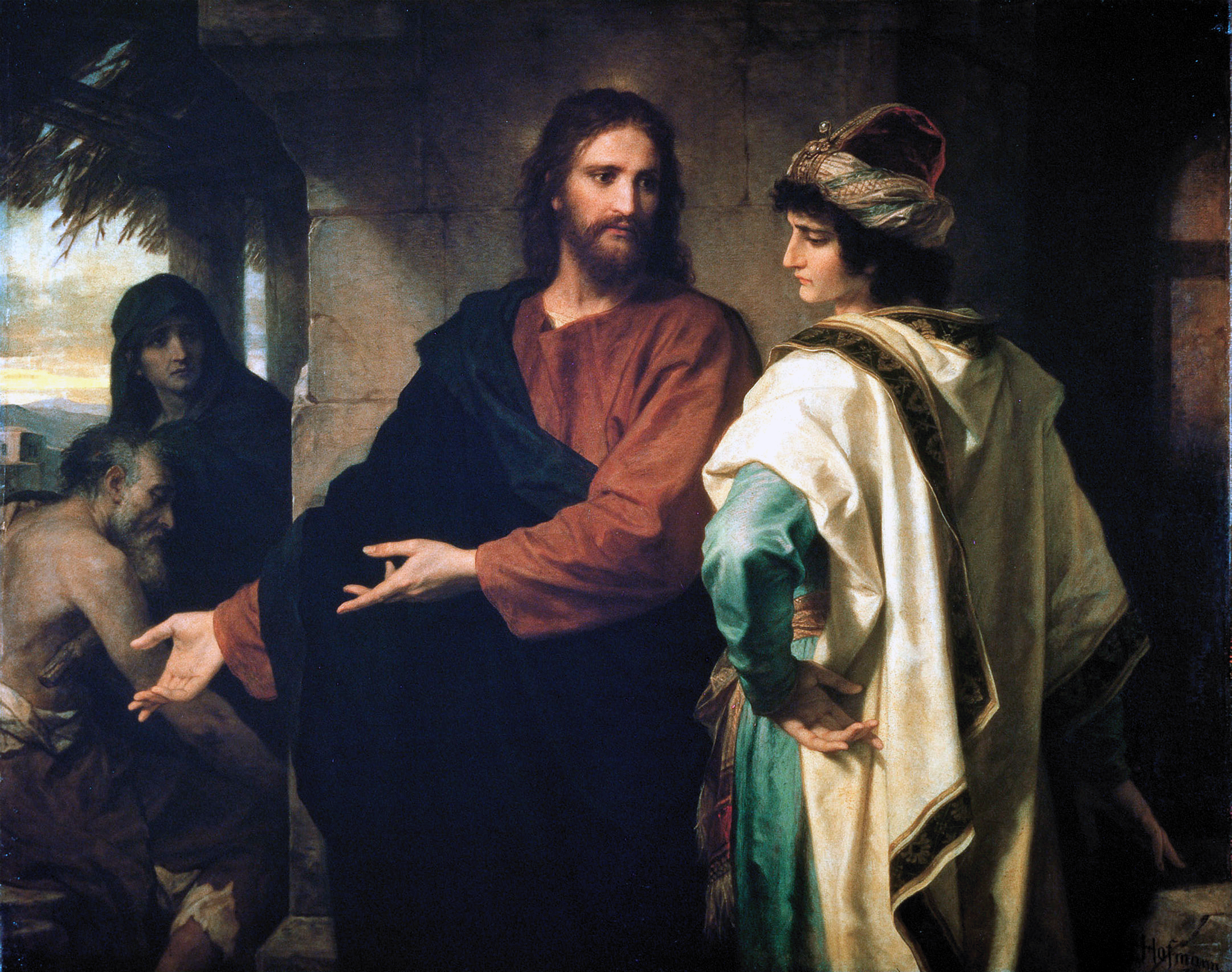
Christ and the Rich Young Ruler by Heinrich Hofmann

Jesus and the rich young man (also called Jesus and the rich ruler) is an episode in the life of Jesus recounted in the Gospel of Matthew 19:16–30, the Gospel of Mark 10:17–31 and the Gospel of Luke 18:18–30 in the New Testament. It deals with material wealth, eternal life and the world to come.

== Narratives ==
Luke 18:25 from the Codex Vaticanus, an early manuscript of the Greek Bible

In Matthew, Mark, and Luke, the discussion is set within the period when Jesus ministered in Perea, east of the River Jordan. In Matthew, a rich young man asks Jesus what actions bring eternal life. First, Jesus advises the man to obey the commandments. When the man responds that he already observes them, and asks what else he can do, Jesus adds:

If you want to be perfect, go, sell your possessions and give to the poor, and you will have treasure in heaven. Then come, follow me.

Luke has a similar episode and states that:

When he heard this, he became very sad, because he was very wealthy. Jesus looked at him and said, "How hard it is for the rich to enter the kingdom of heaven! Indeed, it is easier for a camel to go through the eye of a needle than for someone who is rich to enter the kingdom of heaven."

The non-canonical Gospel of the Nazarenes is mostly identical to the Gospel of Matthew, but one of the differences is an elaboration of this account. It reads:

The other of the rich men said to him "Master, what good thing shall I do and live?" He said to him "Man, perform the law and the prophets." He answered him "I have performed them." He said to him "Go, sell all that thou hast and divide it to the poor, and come, follow me." But the rich man began to scratch his head, and it pleased him not. And the Lord said to him "How can you say 'I have performed the law and the prophets'? seeing that it is written in the law 'Thou shalt love thy neighbor as thyself,' and look, many of your brothers, sons of Abraham, are clad with dung, dying for hunger, and your house is full of much goods, and there goes out therefrom nought at all unto them." And he turned and said to Simon his disciple, sitting by him, "Simon, son of John, it is easier for a camel to enter through the eye of a needle than a rich man into the kingdom of the heavens".

== Interpretation ==
This event relates the term "eternal life" to entry into the Kingdom of God. The account starts with a question to Jesus about eternal life, and Jesus then refers to entry into the Kingdom of God in the same context. The rich young man was the context in which Pope John Paul II brought out the Christian moral law in chapter 1 of his 1993 encyclical letter Veritatis splendor.

While Jesus's instructions to the rich young ruler are often interpreted to be supererogatory for Christians, Dietrich Bonhoeffer argues that this interpretation acquiesces in what he calls "cheap grace", lowering the standard of Christian teaching:

The difference between ourselves and the rich young man is that he was not allowed to solace his regrets by saying: "Never mind what Jesus says, I can still hold on to my riches, but in a spirit of inner detachment. Despite my inadequacy I can take comfort in the thought that God has forgiven me my sins and can have fellowship with Christ in faith." But no, he went away sorrowful. Because he would not obey, he could not believe. In this the young man was quite honest. He went away from Jesus and indeed this honesty had more promise than any apparent communion with Jesus based on disobedience.

Separately, dispensational theologians distinguish between the Gospel of the Kingdom and the Gospel of Grace that is taught in dispensational churches today to avoid conflict with the doctrine which states that salvation is "by grace through faith" articulated in Ephesians 2:8–9.

Justus Knecht reflects on this passage, writing: "The young man had kept the commandments from his youth up; and yet he did not feel satisfied. He wished to do even more than was commanded, or was absolutely necessary; in other words, he wished to reach a higher state of perfection. Our Lord, seeing this, gave him this counsel: 'If thou wishest to be perfect, become voluntarily poor, and follow Me.' There is no desire more noble, or more pleasing to God than the desire for perfection; and as our Lord looked at the young man, He loved him for this yearning of his soul." Knecht goes to say that unfortunately the young man "resisted our Lord’s gracious invitation, because of his too great attachment to the things of this world."

=== In the Church Fathers ===
In his Latin work entitled Quis dives salvetur ("Who is the Rich Man That Shall Be Saved?"), St Clement of Alexandria stated that wealth in itself is neither good nor bad, it is a tool to be used and in itself it is not wrong. He does not espouse the pauperism typical of the Middle Ages; on the contrary, he declares that it is lawful for Christians to possess private property, without prejudice to the duty of charity, to share and redistribute their wealth to the poor. He said:

What does this mean? Not, as some shallow people suppose, that they should cut themselves off from their possessions and wealth, but that they should divert their thoughts from these to higher things, and from the excessive desire and craving for wealth, which is the thorn in their flesh, and tends to suffocate the seed of the life within them. [The rich] must not neglect their salvation as if they were already condemned, nor must they throw wealth overboard or condemn it as treacherous and hostile to life, but they must learn in what way and how to use wealth and procure life. For one is not absolutely lost because he is rich in the grip of fear, nor is one absolutely saved by the certainty and faith that one will be saved.

— Quis dives salvetur.

If you know how to use it well, it will bring you justice; if you use it badly, it will reveal the injustice that is in you. By its very nature it is made to serve, not to command. Wealth, in itself, is neither good nor bad; it does not bear responsibility and therefore does not bear guilt. It is up to the human will, to his ability to choose, to establish how to use the wealth he possesses. It is absurd, therefore, to reject wealth rather than the passions of the soul. In this case, it becomes impossible to make the best use of external goods together with the achievement of inner perfection.

— Clement of Alexandria's Homily entitled Who Is the Rich Man That Is Being Saved

The problem of property and the relationship between rich and poor is also dealt with in De Nabùthae_{it} by St Ambrose of Milan.

== See also ==
- Christian views on poverty and wealth
- Christian socialism
- Epistle of James, 5:1–6
- Evangelical counsels
- Eye of a needle
- Gospel harmony
- Jesuism
- Simple living
- With God, all things are possible
