= Pikes Peak Bible Seminary =

American unaccredited university (1927-?)

Coordinates: 38.85948°N 104.91636°W

Pikes Peak Bible Seminary was an unaccredited correspondence school in Manitou Springs, Colorado. It was founded by C. J. Burton in 1927, and was also known as Burton College and Seminary.

The seminary was used in the 1930s and 1940s by pastors seeking doctorates while serving in a church: William Hendriksen obtained a Doctor of Sacred Theology degree from Pikes Peak (before getting a Doctor of Theology from Princeton Theological Seminary) while Victor Paul Wierwille received a Doctor of Theology degree.

The seminary was regarded as a diploma mill by the United States Office of Education.
