= National Register of Historic Places listings in Darke County, Ohio =

National Register locations in Ohio

Location of Darke County in Ohio

This is a list of the National Register of Historic Places listings in Darke County, Ohio.

This is intended to be a complete list of the properties and districts on the National Register of Historic Places in Darke County, Ohio, United States. The locations of National Register properties and districts for which the latitude and longitude coordinates are included below, may be seen in a Google map.

There are 26 properties and districts listed on the National Register in the county.

This National Park Service list is complete through NPS recent listings posted December 12, 2025.

== Current listings ==
	Name on the Register	Image	Date listed	Location	City or town	Description
1	Bear's Mill	Bear's Mill	June 10, 1975 (#75001372)	6450 Arcanum-Bear's Mill Rd., east of Greenville; 40°06′24″N 84°32′31″W	Adams Township	
2	Anna Beir House	Anna Beir House	April 11, 1977 (#77001055)	214 E. 4th St. 40°06′08″N 84°37′47″W	Greenville	
3	Broadway Bridge	Broadway Bridge	February 22, 1996 (#96000114)	Broadway over Greenville Creek; 40°06′15″N 84°38′07″W	Greenville	
4	Brown Township Building	Brown Township Building	August 30, 1983 (#83001955)	Main and Weller Sts. 40°12′49″N 84°38′14″W	Ansonia	
5	Carnegie Library and Henry St. Clair Memorial Hall	Carnegie Library and Henry St. Clair Memorial Hall	November 26, 1980 (#80002986)	520 Sycamore St. and W. 4th St. 40°05′59″N 84°37′58″W	Greenville	
6	James and Sophia Clemens Farmstead	James and Sophia Clemens Farmstead	March 15, 2001 (#01000199)	467 Stingley Rd., northwest of Palestine; 40°04′39″N 84°47′43″W	Liberty Township	
7	Benjamin Franklin Coppess House	Benjamin Franklin Coppess House	March 10, 1978 (#78002052)	209 Washington St. 40°05′54″N 84°37′48″W	Greenville	
8	Darke County Courthouse, Sheriff's House and Jail	Darke County Courthouse, Sheriff's House and Jail	December 12, 1976 (#76001409)	4th and Broadway; 40°06′02″N 84°37′54″W	Greenville	
9	William English House	William English House	June 2, 1982 (#82003562)	11291 State Route 47, northeast of Versailles; 40°15′05″N 84°27′34″W	Wayne Township	
10	Fort Jefferson Site	Fort Jefferson Site	November 10, 1970 (#70000488)	State Route 121, west of Fort Jefferson; 40°01′32″N 84°39′24″W	Neave Township	
11	Garst House	Garst House	November 16, 1977 (#77001056)	205 N. Broadway; 40°06′25″N 84°38′13″W	Greenville	
12	Greenville Mausoleum	Greenville Mausoleum	October 21, 1976 (#76001410)	West St., Greenville Cemetery; 40°06′25″N 84°38′27″W	Greenville	
13	Greenville South Broadway Commercial District	Greenville South Broadway Commercial District	March 1, 1984 (#84003657)	Roughly S. Broadway from Main to Washington and Martin Sts. 40°06′04″N 84°37′55″W	Greenville	
14	Holy Family Catholic Church	Holy Family Catholic Church	July 26, 1979 (#79002817)	State Route 185 at Frenchtown; 40°14′46″N 84°31′25″W	Wayne Township	
15	Knights of Pythias Hall	Knights of Pythias Hall	August 31, 2018 (#100002876)	118 E. Washington St. 39°58′03″N 84°42′33″W	New Madison	
16	Lambert-Parent House	Lambert-Parent House	May 23, 1980 (#80002987)	631 E. Elm St. 40°12′03″N 84°47′57″W	Union City	
17	Lansdowne House	Lansdowne House	April 20, 1979 (#79001824)	338 E. 3rd St. 40°06′14″N 84°37′43″W	Greenville	
18	Leftwich House	Leftwich House	October 21, 1975 (#75001373)	203 S. Washington St. 40°05′54″N 84°37′48″W	Greenville	
19	Dr. Donovan Robeson House	Dr. Donovan Robeson House	December 12, 1976 (#76001411)	330 W. 4th St. 40°05′55″N 84°38′07″W	Greenville	
20	St. Louis Catholic Church and Rectory	St. Louis Catholic Church and Rectory	July 26, 1979 (#79002835)	East of U.S. Route 127; 40°19′29″N 84°34′13″W	North Star	
21	St. Nicholas Catholic Church and Rectory	St. Nicholas Catholic Church and Rectory	July 26, 1979 (#79002841)	State Route 705 and Washington St. 40°20′26″N 84°29′33″W	Osgood	
22	St. Peter Evangelical Lutheran Church	St. Peter Evangelical Lutheran Church	June 4, 1980 (#80002988)	South of Versailles on St. Peter Rd. 40°11′45″N 84°27′56″W	Wayne Township	
23	Studabaker-Scott House and Beehive School	Studabaker-Scott House and Beehive School	June 15, 1978 (#78002053)	South of Greenville on State Route 49; 40°04′15″N 84°37′56″W	Greenville Township	
24	Versailles Town Hall and Wayne Township House	Versailles Town Hall and Wayne Township House	February 18, 1981 (#81000432)	4 W. Main St. 40°13′21″N 84°29′05″W	Versailles	
25	Christopher C. Walker House and Farm	Christopher C. Walker House and Farm	April 7, 1982 (#82003561)	Southwest of New Madison, north of State Route 121; 39°56′58″N 84°44′10″W	Harrison Township	
26	Waring House	Waring House	September 16, 1977 (#77001057)	304 W. 3rd St. 40°05′59″N 84°38′07″W	Greenville	

== See also ==
- List of National Historic Landmarks in Ohio
- Listings in neighboring counties: Jay (IN), Mercer, Miami, Montgomery, Randolph (IN), Preble, Shelby, Wayne (IN)
- National Register of Historic Places listings in Ohio
