= Waring House (Greenville, Ohio) =

Historic house in Ohio, United States

- U.S. National Register of Historic Places
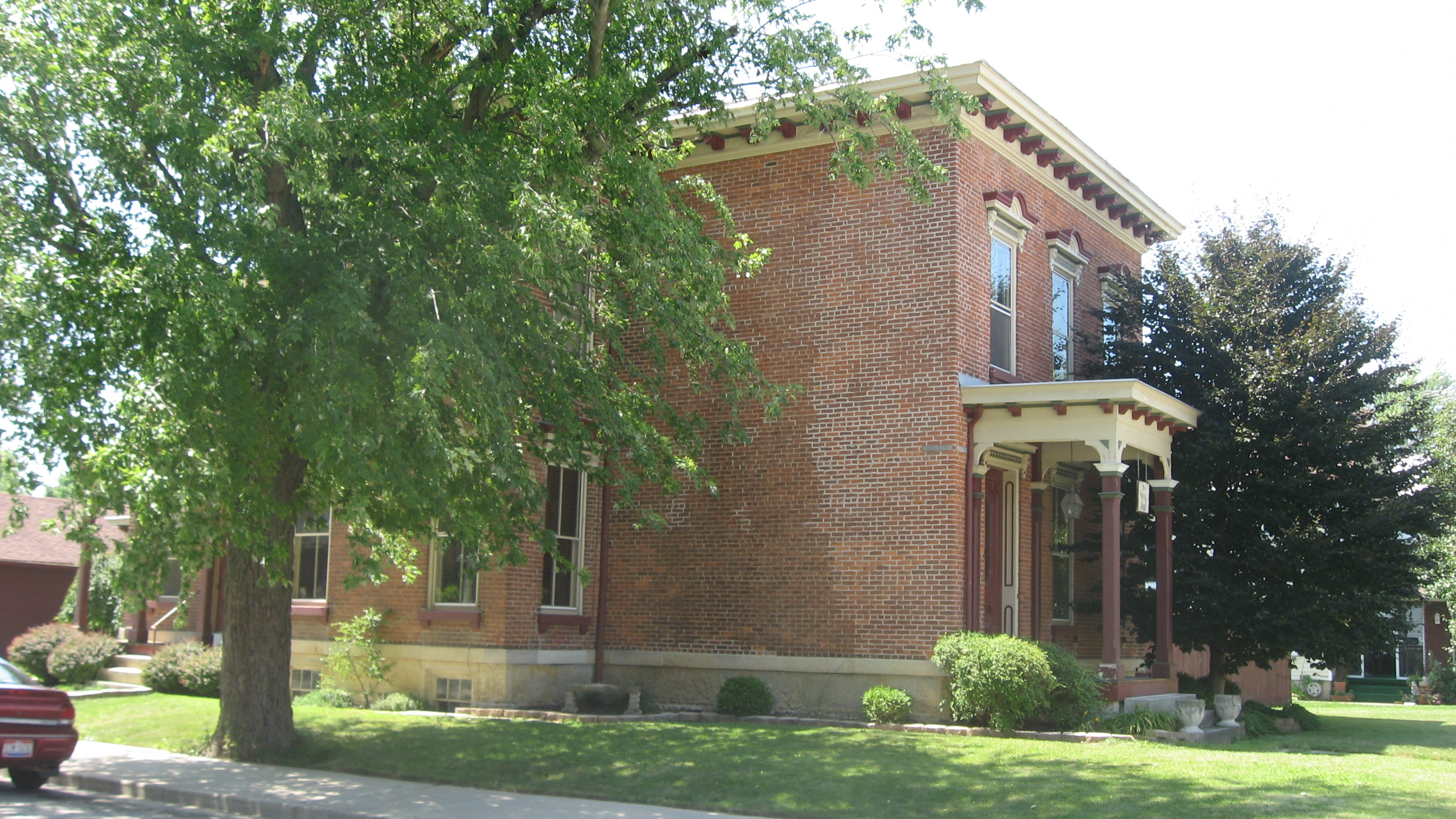
- Front and side of the house

- Location within Ohio Location within the United States
- Location: 304 W. 3rd St., Greenville, Ohio
- Coordinates: 40°5′59″N 84°38′7″W
- Area: less than one acre
- Built: 1869
- Architectural style: Late Victorian
- NRHP reference No.: 77001057
- Added to NRHP: September 16, 1977

The Waring House (also known as the "Waring-Stockslager Home") is a historic house in Greenville, Ohio, United States. Built by Oliver C. Perry, the house was started in 1860, but construction was only substantially completed in 1869, and the details took two more years to finish. As soon as he had finished the house, Perry sold it to T.M. Taylor, who in turn sold it to the family of local businessman and county commissioner Thomas Waring. Waring and his family were the first individuals to occupy the house, taking up residence in November 1874.

The Waring House is a brick structure that rests upon a foundation of stone; it is topped with a roof of asphalt, and various other elements are made of metal. Its overall floor plan is rectangular, although modified by the addition of three wings to the rear. The dining room is a major part of a substantial two-story, two-bay wing attached to the main portion of the house, while two single-story wings — a single-bay structure in the form of a large pavilion, and a double-bay structure containing the kitchen — are in turn attached to the dining room wing.

Among the Waring House's leading architectural elements are its windows, especially the distinctive segmental windows of the dining room wing. Overall, the house is a fine example of the Victorian style of residential architecture; although many nineteenth-century Greenville houses have been well preserved to the present time, few are as pristine as the home of Thomas Waring. In recognition of its historically significant architecture, the Waring House was listed on the National Register of Historic Places on September 16, 1977; it was recognized as important primarily in the local community. Six other Greenville houses — known as the Beir, Coppess, Garst, Lansdowne, Leftwich, and Robeson Houses — have been accorded a similar honor; the Waring House was the fourth of these seven buildings to receive this designation. Today, the Waring House is operated as a bed and breakfast.
