= Edward Sigerfoos =

United States Army general

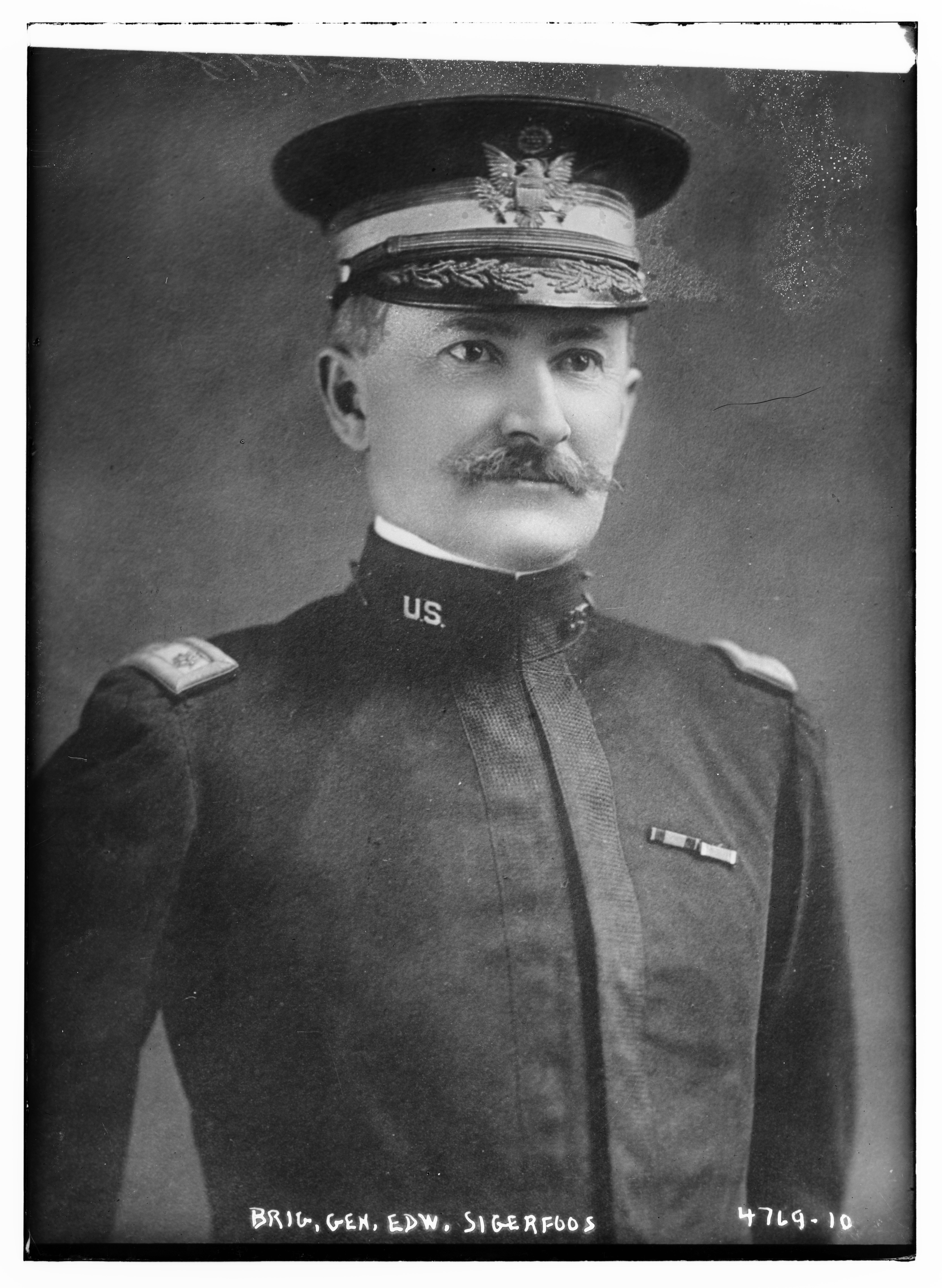
- Bain News Service Collection, Library of Congress
- Born: December 14, 1868; Potsdam, Ohio, U.S.
- Died: October 7, 1918 (aged 49); Montblainville, Meuse, France
- Burial place: Arlington National Cemetery, Arlington County, Virginia
- Education: Ohio State University (B.Ph.); University of Minnesota Law School (LL.B., LL.M.)
- Spouse: Opal (Robeson) Sigerfoos (m. 1895-1918, his death)
- Children: 2
- Military career
- Allegiance: United States
- Branch: United States Army
- Service years: 1891–1918
- Rank: Brigadier General
- Commands: 152d Depot Brigade; 56th Infantry Brigade
- Conflicts: Philippine–American War; Border War (1910–19); World War I
- Awards: Distinguished Service Medal (U.S. Army)

Brigadier General Edward Sigerfoos (December 14, 1868 – October 7, 1918) was a senior United States Army officer. From 1891 to 1918, his military service included a number of assignments in the continental United States, Cuba, the Philippines, China, and France. He saw active service in the Philippine–American War and World War I. While in France in 1918, he was nominated by President Woodrow Wilson for promotion to brigadier general. During the Meuse-Argonne Offensive, he was wounded mortally and died shortly before the United States Senate confirmed his nomination. He was promoted posthumously and was the only American general to be killed in combat during the war.

== Early life ==
Edward Sigerfoos was born to George W. Sigerfoos and Nancy Sigerfoos (née Shank) on December 14, 1868. The elder Sigerfoos had a number of professions during his lifetime, working as a school teacher at one point, until finally opening a dry goods business in Arcanum, Ohio in 1872. He ran this business until his death three years later.

Sigerfoos' path to becoming commissioned as a United States Army officer was unconventional for his time. Deciding to attend the Ohio State University with his brother Charles, Sigerfoos arrived at the institution in the fall of 1885 and spent two years at a preparatory school before matriculating as a freshman. He served as a cadet during his university days and eventually commanded a company of students as a captain. His capabilities as a leader resulted in presentation of a sword acknowledging him for having the best drilled company. In addition, he received a medal to recognize his performance during a state drill and ceremony contest in Portsmouth, Ohio.

In addition to his cadet leadership role, Sigerfoos was a prominent member of the study body. A university peer later recalled him as being "not an ordinary student." Sigerfoos "took high rank in the class room, won honors as a public speaker" and was chief editor of the student newspaper. He also maintained a close association with a group of students that later in life would become academically influential, including Francis C. Wood. Sigerfoos was a member of Phi Beta Kappa, Beta Theta Pi, and Sigma Xi.

Shortly after graduating with a B.Ph. degree in 1891, Sigerfoos applied for a commission in the regular army. Of 3,500 applicants, Sigerfoos was one of only 25 selected. He was appointed as a second lieutenant in the 5th Infantry Regiment on August 1, 1891.

== Military service prior to 1900 ==
=== Prelude to the Spanish–American War ===
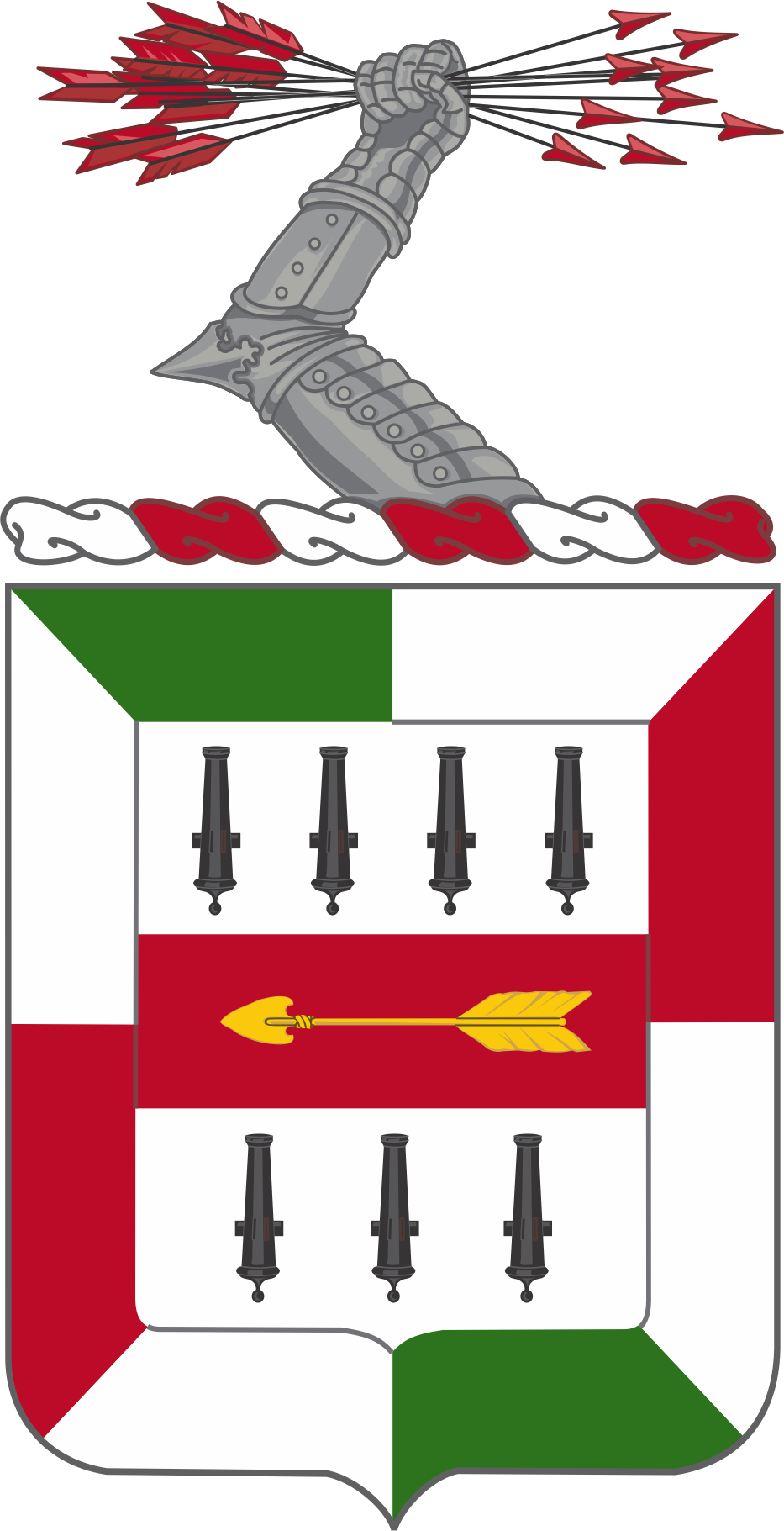
The coat of arms for the 5th Infantry Regiment.

In May 1891, changes were made to the disposition of the various companies of the 5th Infantry Regiment. The companies at first were dispersed to St. Augustine, Jackson Barracks, and Mount Vernon Arsenal; however, later that year two more companies were transferred elsewhere, with one moving to Fort Sam Houston and the other to Fort Leavenworth. Sigerfoos was stationed at Fort Leavenworth by January, 1893. It was at this time that a local newspaper interviewed him on the subject of military training and the various schools on the post. He was found to be "unusually handsome and intelligent." He went through the United States Infantry and Cavalry School, located on the post, and completed the course as an honor graduate in 1895. Afterwards he rejoined his regiment, which departed Fort Leavenworth in the fall of 1894, at Fort McPherson. The regiment remained there until the Spanish–American War began.

=== Spanish–American War and Occupation of Cuba ===
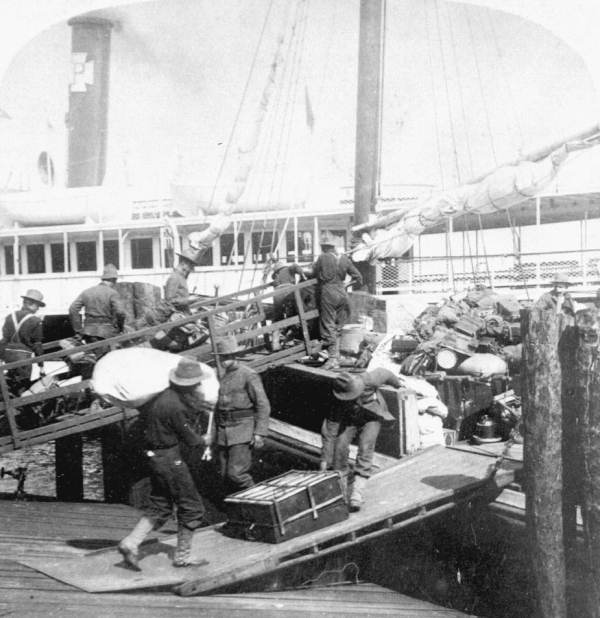
Tampa was a strategic supply base and center of water transportation for United States military forces operating in the Caribbean during the Spanish–American War.

In mid-July the regiment was concentrated in Tampa for the invasion of Puerto Rico. During the spring of 1898, in anticipation of war with Spain, the 5th Infantry Regiment received orders to man a number of coastal fortifications on the southern coast of the United States. Most of the regiment left Fort McPherson by mid April with the bulk of it, the headquarters, band, and four companies, sent to Tampa. Sigerfoos was left in charge of the post for an unspecified period of time. He had with him a detachment of two men from each company and men from the signal corps, with orders to guard the fort's property and protect the officers' families. Sigerfoos was promoted to first lieutenant on April 26 after the war began.

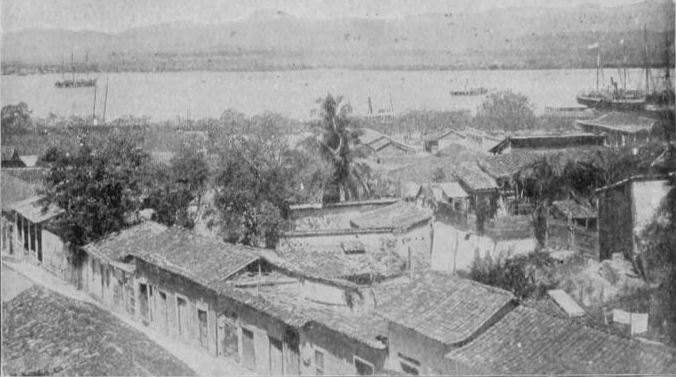
Photo of Santiago de Cuba taken in 1898.

In mid-July the regiment was concentrated in Tampa for the invasion of Puerto Rico; however, it ultimately did not participate in the campaign. Hostilities ended before the regiment saw combat. Instead, it left the country on August 21, 1898, for occupation duty in the city of Santiago de Cuba. The men arrived to their destination on August 25. Remaining as one whole unit until the spring of 1899, the withdrawal of volunteer infantry regiments from Cuba prompted the 5th Infantry Regiment to be broken up into detachments. These detachments were spread throughout the province of Santiago and were "actively engaged" in the suppression of the "frequent depredations of organized brigands."

By early January 1899, the regiment's headquarters was established at Morro Castle with Sigerfoos acting as battalion adjutant of the depot battalion. The depot battalion, the 3rd battalion, left Cuba for Fort Sheridan on September 21 of that year. By the time the entire regiment left Cuba, it lost two officers and seventy-four enlisted men to a variety of tropical diseases.

=== Philippine–American War and Occupation of the Philippines ===
Sigerfoos enjoyed a brief respite in Illinois before his regiment embarked on another tour of duty overseas. In early February, 1900, Sigerfoos was appointed recorder for an army retiring board that was to meet in Chicago under the command of assistant judge advocate-general Thomas F. Barr." He was appointed to serve on another board later that month. Scheduled to meet at Fort Sheridan, the purpose of this board was to examine candidates for the United States Military Academy.

Elements of the regiment began to leave for the Philippines in late August 1900, with the entire regiment in the islands by that winter. Sigerfoos would remain there for the next three to four years, part of which was in direct participation in the Philippine–American War and later the United States occupation of the islands. He was promoted to captain on February 2, 1901, and in the following September was made an adjutant. During its service in the war, the 5th Infantry Regiment was actively pursuing forces of the Philippine Republican Army. The companies and various detachments of the regiment marched a total of over 15,426 miles and engaged in thirty-eight skirmishes and minor actions before hostilities ended in July, 1902. In areas under American control, it became necessary for the military to administer law. Sigerfoos served as judge-advocate on a number of military commissions throughout the year of 1901. One such commission met at Vigan, in the province of Ilocos Sur on Luzon, in June. The commission tried Noverto Pré, an insurgent army officer for "murder in violation of the laws and customs of war." Sentenced "to be hung by the neck until...dead," Pré's sentence was commuted to fifteen years of hard labor at a prison in Manila. The proceedings of this case, along with nine other murder trials in which Sigerfoos served as judge-advocate, was published in an extensive rebuttal by the War Department in response to allegations that the United States military was committing atrocities against Filipinos during the war. The War Department called the allegations "either unfounded or grossly exaggerated."

== Military service after 1900 ==
=== Continued career ===
After returning to the continental United States in the early 1900s, in 1905 Sigerfoos was assigned as professor of military science at the University of Minnesota. The assignment allowed him to join his brother Charles, a professor of animal biology, as a faculty member. In addition to his duties as an instructor, Sigerfoos enrolled in the university's law school. He received his LL.B. in 1908 and his LL.M. the following year. Using his experience as a judge advocate in the Philippines, in 1908 he published an article exploring the question of whether or not United States military forces in the Philippines were entitled to a trial by jury. He concluded that servicemen were "amenable to trial by the civil courts" when offenses are committed against their native laws; however, a "trial by jury will not be accorded them" unless Congress extended the Seventh Amendment to the Philippines.

=== Service in China ===
Sigerfoos arrived to China on March 28, 1917, in order to serve with the 15th Infantry Regiment stationed in the city of Tianjin.

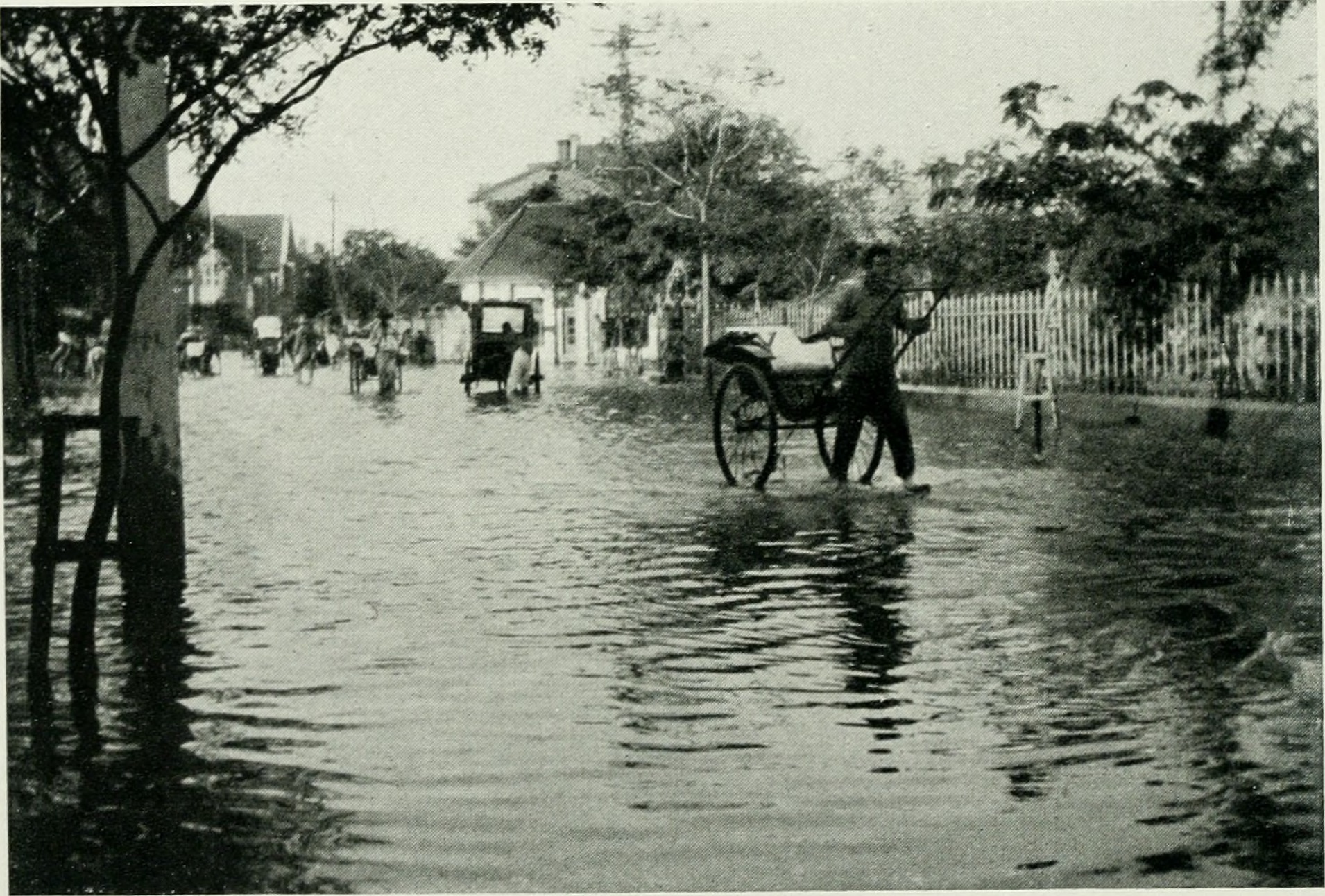
Photo of the 1917 flood that struck Tianjin.

A disastrous flood struck the vicinity of Tianjin later that year. Dr. Paul S. Reinsch, the American Minister at Peking, received monetary assistance from the American Red Cross Society that was to be used in relief work. A committee was formed and tasked with outlining the policy and controlling the work. The members in October agreed that with winter fast approaching, priority would be given to the adequate accommodation of some of the city's 55,000 refugees. It was decided that a camp of "1,000 huts, of reed and mud," were to be built and Sigerfoos, a member of the committee, was assigned as administrator.

Called the 'American Flood Relief Camp,' more than 6,000 flood survivors were eventually cared for at the facility before its dismantlement in the early spring of 1918. Sigerfoos returned to the United States in mid January 1918 and was not in charge of the camp upon its closure. "Major Morrow and his associates" received praise for their efficient management of the facility, in which superior sanitary conditions prevented the outbreaks of any contagious diseases; however, Sigerfoos was also responsible for this successful outcome.

=== World War I ===
Sigerfoos commanded first the 152d Depot Brigade at Camp Upton, New York. He was later appointed to command the 56th Infantry Brigade and nominated for promotion to brigadier general.

== Death ==
=== Mortally wounded ===
On September 29, 1918, Sigerfoos was mortally wounded near Montblainville, France, close to the Argonne Forest. He had been in command of the 28th Division's 56th Brigade for only an hour. He lingered until October 7, when he died of his wounds.

=== Reburial ===
Sigerfoos was initially buried in the cemetery near the hospital where he died. In 1921, he was reburied at Arlington National Cemetery.

== Legacy ==
Congress approved Sigerfoos' promotion to brigadier general on October 10, unaware that he had died. In 1920, Congress enacted legislation indicating that Sigerfoos would retain the posthumous rank of brigadier general, and that his effective date of rank would be October 4, 1918.

Among Sigerfoos' awards was the Army Distinguished Service Medal, which was awarded posthumously to recognize his World War I service. After the war, two American Legion posts were named for him, one in New York City and one in Arcanum, Ohio.

== Dates of promotions ==
Insignia	Rank	Component	Date
No Insignia in 1886	Second Lieutenant	5th Infantry Regiment	August 1, 1891 (Appointed Aug. 1, accepted Aug. 4)
	First Lieutenant	5th Infantry Regiment	April 26, 1898
	Captain	5th Infantry Regiment	February 2, 1901
	Major	7th Infantry Regiment	September 5, 1913
	Lieutenant Colonel	15th Infantry Regiment	September 4, 1917
	Colonel	National Army	November 5, 1917
	Colonel	Regular Army (Temporary)	February 26, 1918
	Brigadier General	National Army	October 4, 1918

== Personal life and family ==
Sigerfoos married Opal Robeson, daughter of Dr. Donovan Robeson, at Arcanum, Ohio, on December 27, 1895. Dr. Robeson later in his life moved to and built a home in Greenville, Ohio. It is currently listed on the National Register of Historic Places.

The couple had two children: Grace and Edward.

The younger Edward followed in his father's footsteps and entered the army as well. Graduating from the University of Michigan in 1935 with a M.D., he became commissioned as a first lieutenant in the Medical Corps the following year. He saw service in World War II, the Korean War, and the Vietnam War, eventually leaving the army as a colonel His wife, Frances, was daughter of Olin H. Longino. Longino entered the army in September 1908, becoming assigned to the Coast Artillery Corps, rising to the rank of brigadier general in early 1941. Edward Sigerfoos died on May 5, 2000, and is buried at Fort Sam Houston National Cemetery.
