= Donovan Robeson House =

Historic house in Ohio, United States

- Dr. Donovan Robeson House
- U.S. National Register of Historic Places
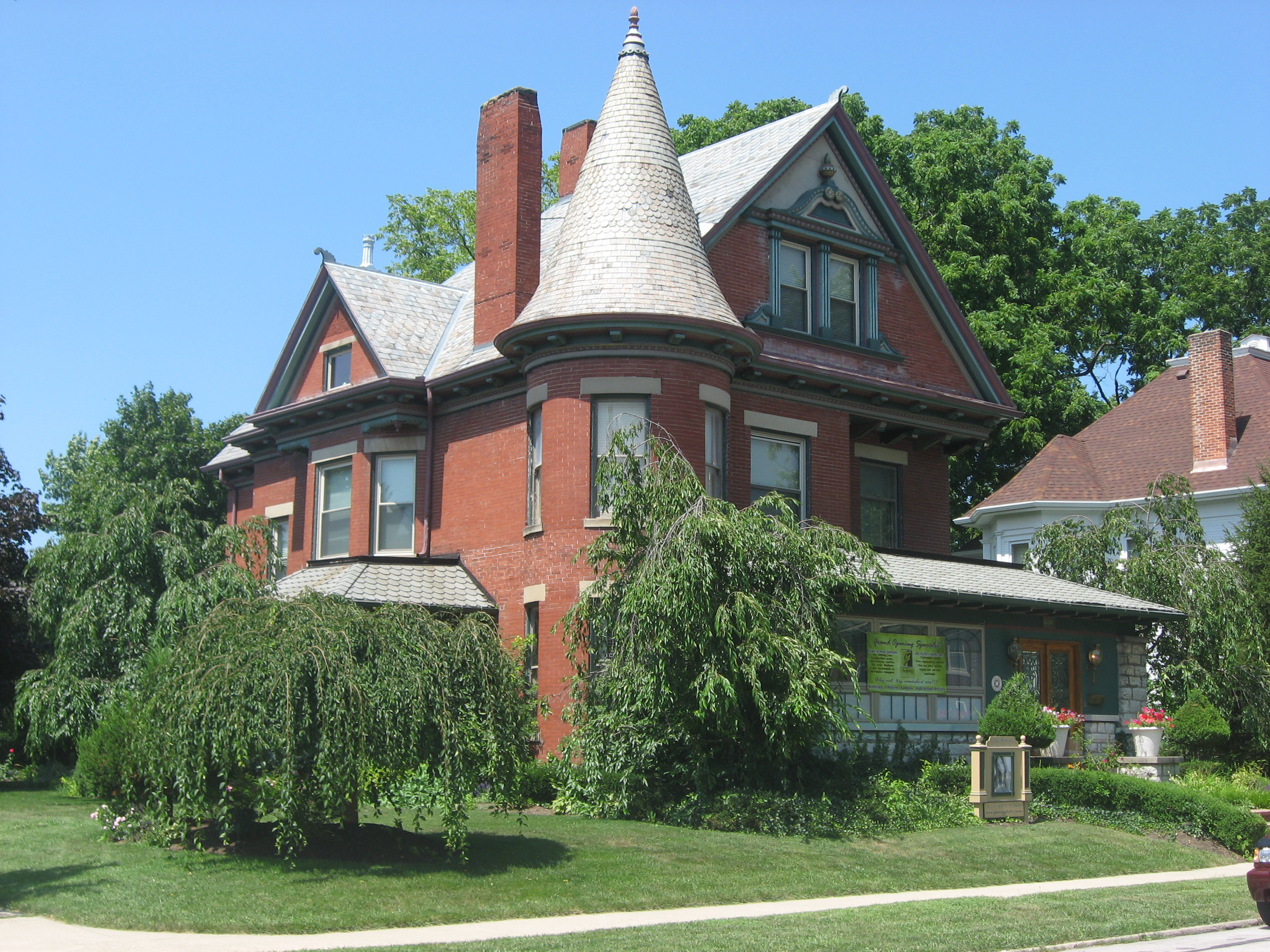
- Front of the house

- Location within Ohio Location within the United States
- Location: 330 W. 4th St., Greenville, Ohio
- Coordinates: 40°5′55″N 84°38′7″W
- Area: less than one acre
- Built: 1902
- Architectural style: Queen Anne
- NRHP reference No.: 76001411
- Added to NRHP: December 12, 1976

The Donovan Robeson House is a historic house in Greenville, Ohio, United States. Located along Fourth Street west of downtown, the Robeson House has been ranked as the city's most significant Queen Anne mansion.

As of May 2021, the house is known as Clark House and has fallen into disrepair with roof shingles missing, overgrown and neglected landscaping and almost the entire house in various states of repair.

== Robeson's life ==
After graduation from the Ohio Medical College in 1870, Robeson practiced medicine in Illinois for a short while before moving to Darke County. In 1895, his daughter Opal married Edward Sigerfoos. Following a period of service in the village of Arcanum, he moved to Greenville in 1900, where he arranged for the construction of a combined house-and-office building. Besides maintaining his medical practice, Robeson was a public servant, holding office as a county probate judge from 1902 to 1908.

== Architecture ==
Built in 1902, the Robeson House is a two-and-a-half story brick house with a front turret. Among the most significant details are its stone foundation, its slate roof, and a pavilion-style porch on the front. Inside, the living room is heated by a Mission Revival style fireplace, and the dining room is ornamented with a sideboard of walnut.

As of 2021, the pavilion-style porch has been entirely removed affecting the front aesthetic of the house -as would the removal of any signature Queen Anne wraparound porch. The remaining porch is a rectangular closed-in "Florida Room" merely the size of the entrance porch. The built-in sideboard of walnut has also been removed and is no longer evidenced in the home.

== Recognition ==
In December 1976, the Robeson House was listed on the National Register of Historic Places because of its well-preserved historic architecture. It was the fourth place in Greenville to be listed, after the Leftwich House, the Greenville Mausoleum, and the courthouse complex.

As of 2021, the formerly, well-preserved historic architecture is in extreme disrepair and key elements of the architecture (pavilion-style wraparound porch, walnut sideboard) which placed it on the registry have been removed.
