= Broadway Bridge (Greenville, Ohio) =

- U.S. National Register of Historic Places
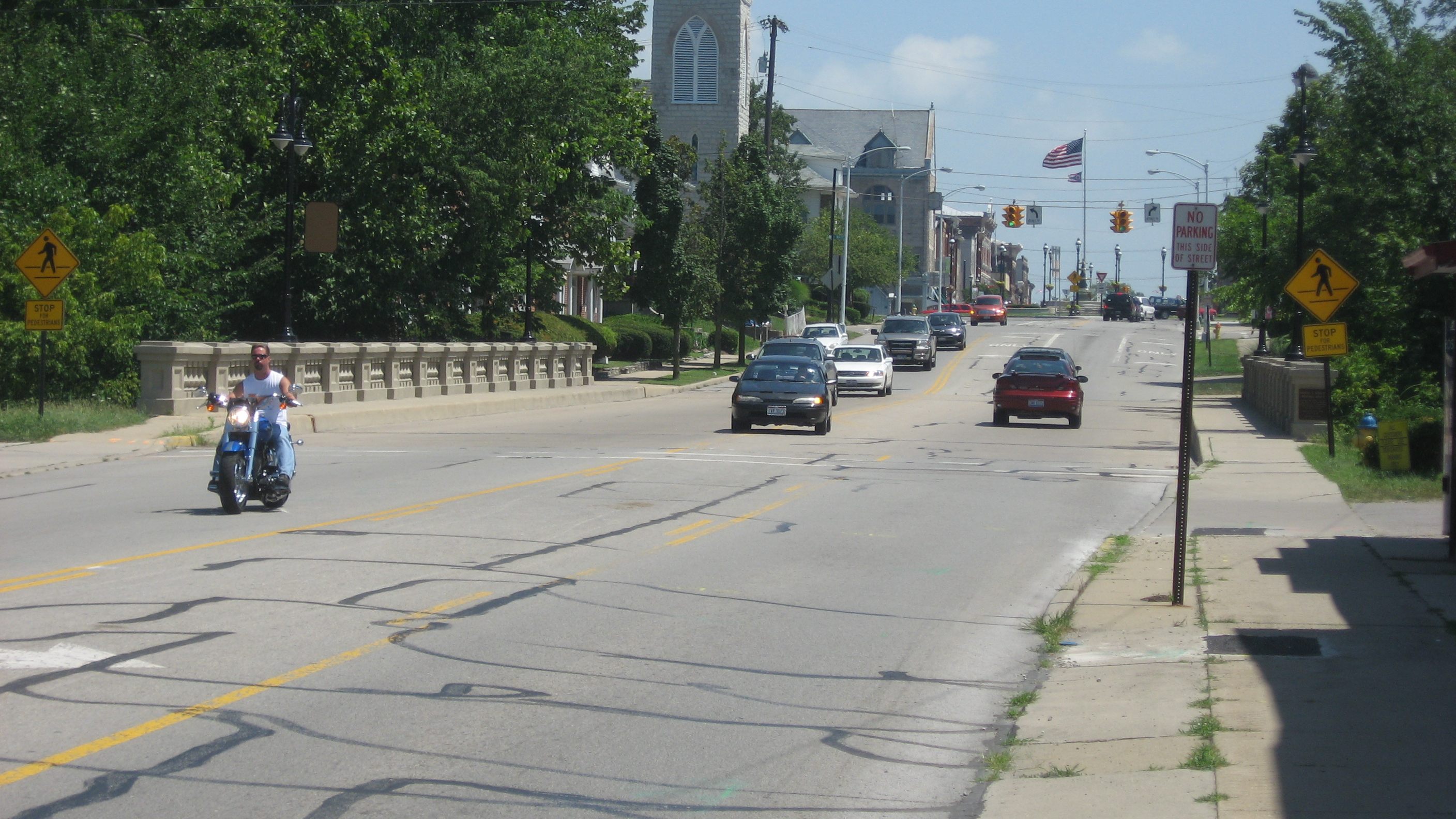
- Overview from northwest, looking toward downtown

- Location within Ohio Location within the United States
- Location: Broadway over Greenville Creek, Greenville, Ohio
- Coordinates: 40°6′15″N 84°38′7″W
- Area: Less than 1 acre (0.40 ha)
- Built: 1909
- Architects: Walter Rice; A.W. Zesiger
- Architectural style: Three-hinged arch
- NRHP reference No.: 96000114
- Added to NRHP: February 22, 1996

The Broadway Bridge is a historic arch bridge that spans Greenville Creek on the edge of downtown Greenville, a city in the far western part of the U.S. state of Ohio. Constructed in the early twentieth century, it carries one of the city's most important streets and connects the city's northern and southern sections. One of several large concrete bridges designed by a Cleveland engineer, it has been named a historic site.

== History ==
As late as 1857, Greenville was restricted to the southeastern side of Greenville Creek; only about four or five houses were located in what has since become the northern part of the city. However, a Greenville Creek bridge existed by this time, and around it existed a smattering of industries. Like today, Broadway was an important thoroughfare, with the old courthouse occupying a place on the public square, and a dense commercial district lining both sides of the street for several blocks to the south of the square. The current courthouse was constructed in 1874, and Broadway was paved with brick in 1900 as numerous commercial buildings continued to rise along its sides. The location of the present bridge is close to the Treaty of Greenville signing grounds; construction by the bridge in the late nineteenth or early twentieth centuries revealed burials of officers from the Legion of the United States.

In 1994, the bridge was designated as an Ohio Historic Civil Engineering Landmark by the American Society of Civil Engineers.

== Architecture ==
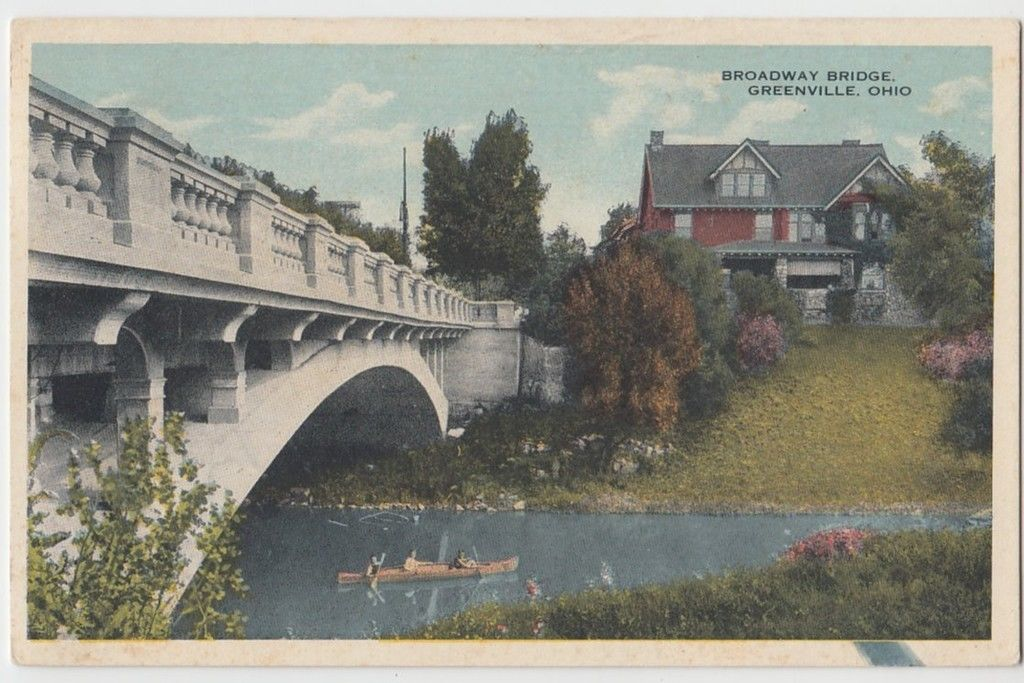
Upstream side of the bridge, pictured circa 1920

Constructed in 1909, the Broadway Bridge is a three-hinged arch bridge built of concrete. A single span crosses the entire stream, and a balustrade prevents vehicles and pedestrians from falling over the side into the stream. The bridge's designer, A.W. Zesiger, constructed multiple three-hinged arch concrete bridges; one that spanned a creek at Brookside Park in Cleveland was once considered the world's flattest semi-elliptical arch. These two bridges were constructed in a similar manner, although the slightly flatter Cleveland bridge was lighter and smaller than the Greenville bridge, whose location required it to carry heavier loads than a bridge placed in a park. Not long after completing the bridge in Greenville, Zesiger became known for a substantially larger structure: as the Cuyahoga County Bridge Engineer, he helped to supervise the construction of the concrete-and-steel Detroit-Superior High Level Bridge, which was completed in 1917.

== Preservation ==
In 1996, the Broadway Bridge was listed on the National Register of Historic Places, qualifying both because of its place in local history and because it remained a well-preserved example of early twentieth-century engineering. It is one of twelve National Register-listed locations in Greenville; among the others are the courthouse and the business district on Broadway, which has been named a historic district. Today, two state highways — State Routes 49 and 571 — cross Greenville Creek on the bridge.
