= Waring House =

Waring House may refer to:

- Waring House (Greenville, Ohio)
- Daniel Waring House, also known as Indian Hill, located just outside the village of Montgomery, New York
