= Studabaker-Scott House and Beehive School =

Historic house in Ohio, United States

- U.S. National Register of Historic Places
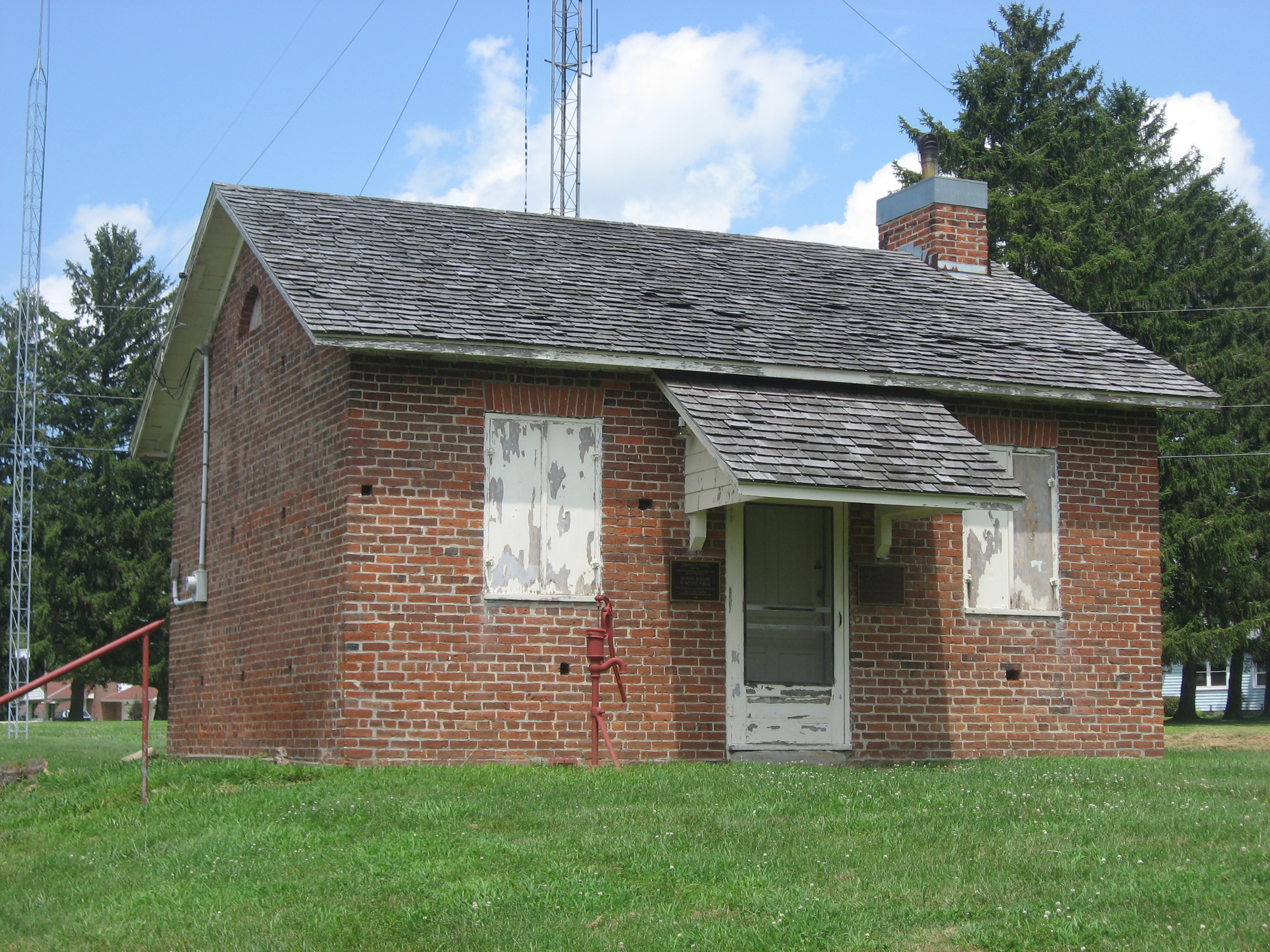
- Front of the Beehive School

- Location within Ohio Location within the United States
- Nearest city: Greenville, Ohio
- Coordinates: 40°4′15″N 84°37′56″W
- Area: 0 acres (0 ha)
- Built: 1835
- Architectural style: Victorian, Greek Revival, Federal
- NRHP reference No.: 78002053
- Added to NRHP: June 15, 1978

The Studabaker-Scott House and Beehive School are two historic buildings near the city of Greenville in Darke County, Ohio, United States. Located along State Route 49 south of the city, both are unusually well-preserved remnants of the architecture of the middle third of the 19th century.

A native of Pennsylvania, Abraham Studabaker settled in Scioto County, Ohio in 1795; after moving northwest to Warren County, he travelled north and built a cabin in modern-day Darke County in 1808, becoming the first settler within the present boundaries of Adams Township. From the county's earliest years, Studabaker was a prominent member of local society; when Darke County was formed in 1816, he was elected to the county commission. Moving to Greenville Township in 1815, he built a larger homestead in 1835, but it was a simple structure like that of most period houses.

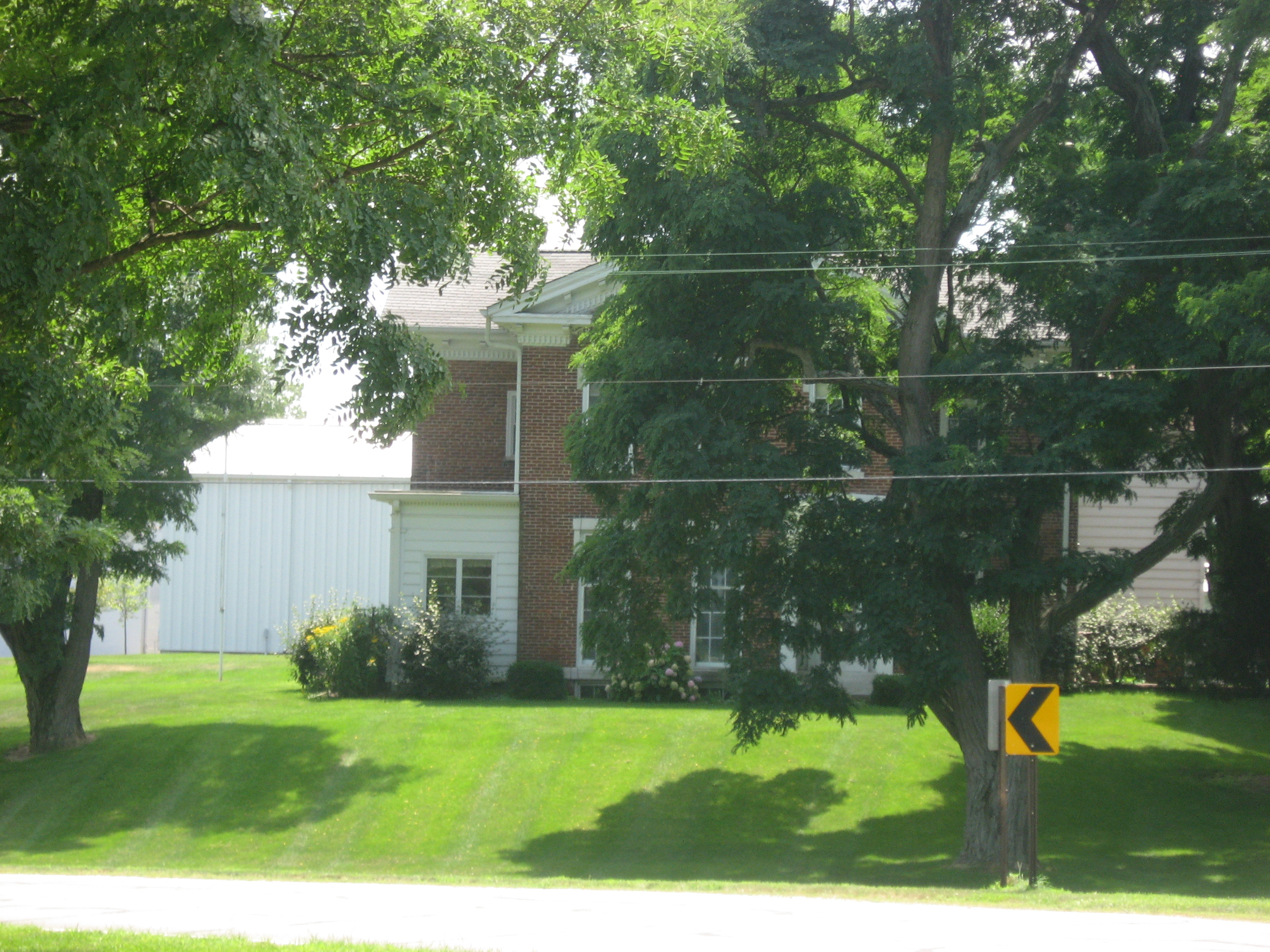
Front of the Studabaker-Scott House

In the 1850s, many former pioneers began to expand their homesteads: as prosperity increased, landowners renovated their old houses according to the prevailing architectural styles of the day. Studabaker followed this pattern; his old farmhouse took on a mix of the Early Victorian and Greek Revival architectural styles, and its location along one of the county's most important roads gave his house a prominence enjoyed by few other houses in the area.

Located very close to Abraham Studabaker's house is the Beehive School. Built in 1846, it was one of the earliest permanent school buildings — in contrast to the primitive log structures built by the first settlers — in Darke County. Unlike the Studabaker House, this brick building features elements of the Federal style of architecture.

In 1978, the house and school were listed on the National Register of Historic Places. Although the two buildings both qualified for inclusion on the Register, they and a third contributing building were listed together as a single property. Key to their being listed on the Register was their well-preserved historic architecture and their connection to Abraham Studabaker, because of his place as one of the region's leading pioneers.
