= Lansdowne House (Greenville, Ohio) =

Historic house in Ohio, United States

- U.S. National Register of Historic Places
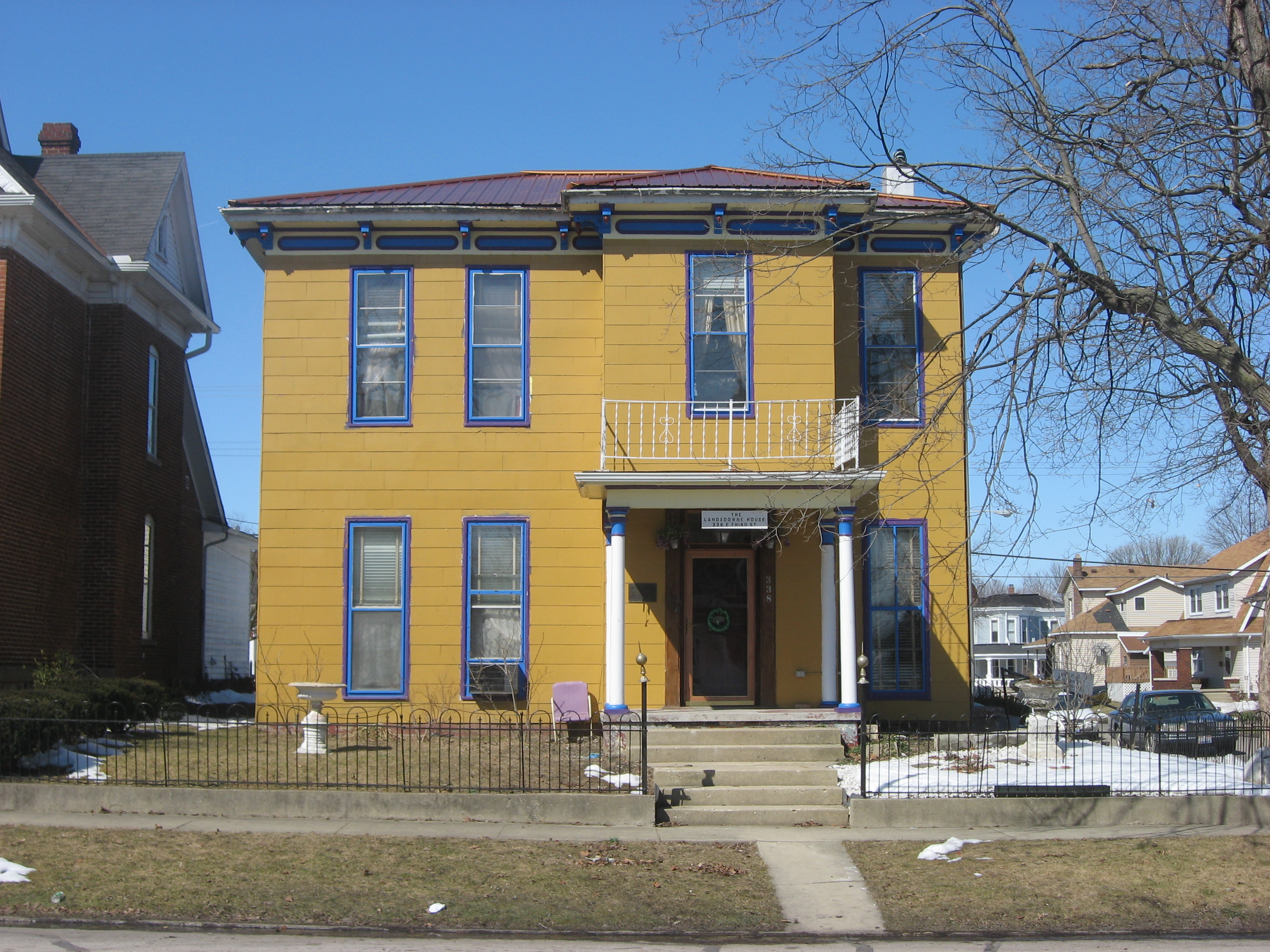
- Front of the house

- Location within Ohio Location within the United States
- Location: 338 E. 3rd St., Greenville, Ohio
- Coordinates: 40°6′14″N 84°37′43″W
- Area: Less than 1 acre (0.40 ha)
- Built: 1870
- NRHP reference No.: 79001824
- Added to NRHP: April 20, 1979

The Lansdowne House is a historic house in Greenville, Ohio, United States. Built in 1870, it was the residence of Zachary Lansdowne, who was a pioneer in the development of the U.S. Navy's airship program and commanded the airship Shenandoah. A native of Greenville, Lansdowne attended the United States Naval Academy upon graduating from Greenville High School; as Shenandoah's skipper, he was killed in its crash on September 3, 1925.

Architecturally, the Lansdowne House is unremarkable. It is a simple two-story rectangular frame structure, topped with a shingled roof and supported by a foundation of limestone.

In 1979, the Lansdowne House was listed on the National Register of Historic Places. It qualified to be added to the Register because of its connection to Zachary Lansdowne.
