= Benjamin Franklin Coppess House =

Historic house in Ohio, United States

- U.S. National Register of Historic Places
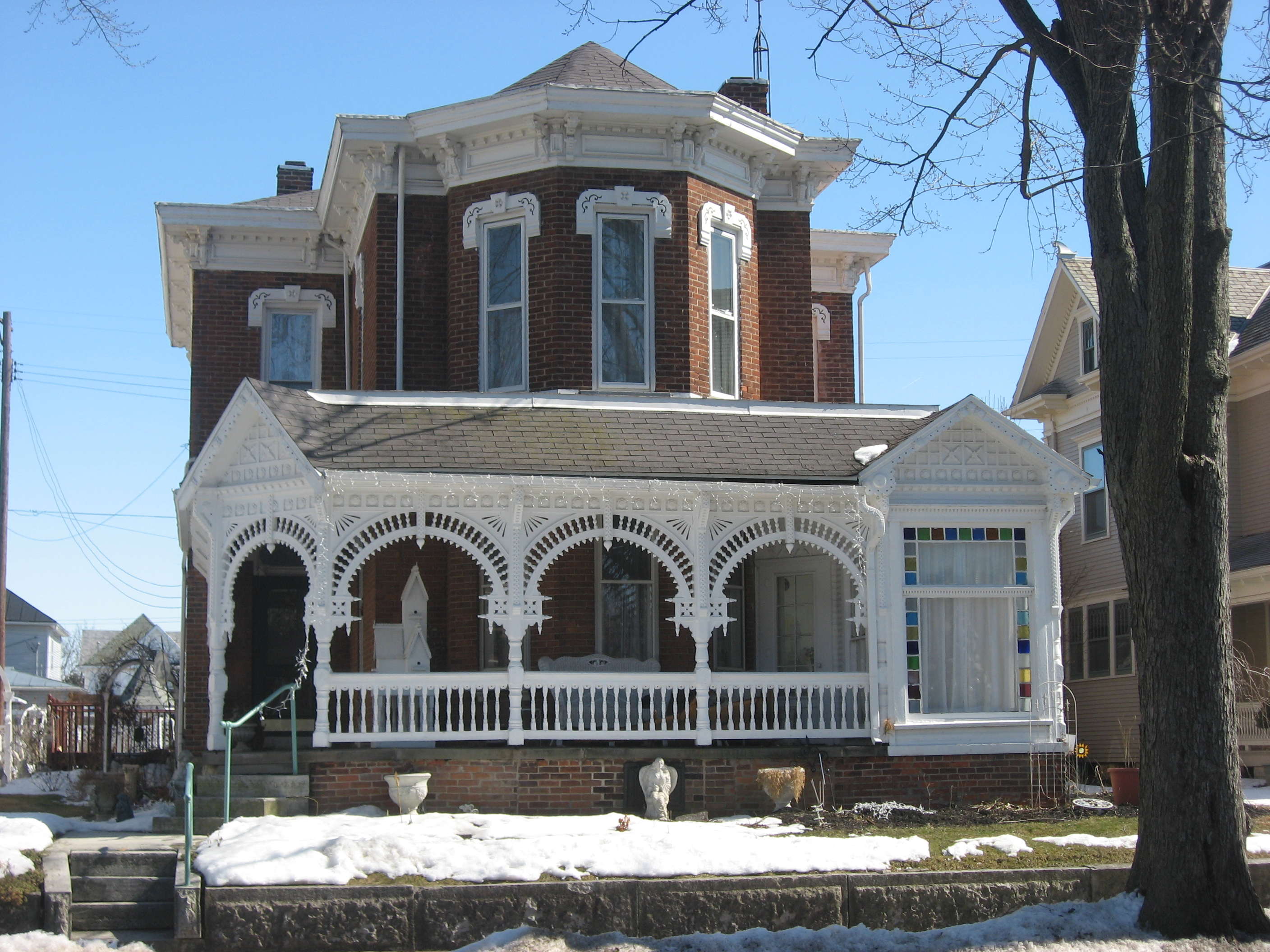
- Front of the house

- Location within Ohio Location within the United States
- Location: 209 Washington St., Greenville, Ohio
- Coordinates: 40°5′54″N 84°37′48″W
- Area: Less than 1 acre (0.40 ha)
- Built: 1882
- Architectural style: Queen Anne/Stick-Eastlake
- NRHP reference No.: 78002052
- Added to NRHP: March 10, 1978

The Benjamin Franklin Coppess House, built in 1882, is a historic Queen Anne and Stick-Eastlake style house located at 209 Washington Street in Greenville, Ohio, United States.

The old house certainly appears more beautiful to many because of the flower gardens that have been planned by the owner.

== Architecture ==
Featuring an unusually detailed Stick-Eastlake brick facade, the Coppess House is a T-shaped building that is supported by a stone foundation; the roof is asphalt, and minor elements of stone are also visible. A large enclosed porch and a veranda wrap around the "lower" portion of the "T", which faces the street, while above and behind the porch, placed at the base of the "T", sits a large bay window. The porch is among the most crucial components of the building, due to elements such as exquisitely detailed arches formed of tiny spindles, which sprout from columns meant to resemble massive table legs; one must walk under one such arch to use the porch's main entrance, located on one of its corners, and three more such arches are placed on the front and on the side to either side of the entrance. Small gables are placed over the porch's main entrance and a subsidiary one, decorated with small sculptures, both carven and molded.

== Historical significance ==
In 1978, the Coppess House was listed on the National Register of Historic Places, qualifying because of its historically significant architecture; it is one of two such houses on Washington Street, along with the Leftwich House elsewhere in the same block. As well as its distinctive porch, the house is historically significant because of a bathroom — it is believed to have been the first Greenville building with a flush toilet. Its builder, Benjamin Coppess, was a farmer and local government official in Darke County and the grandson of one of the county's earliest pioneers.
