= Anna Beir House =

Historic house in Ohio, United States

- U.S. National Register of Historic Places
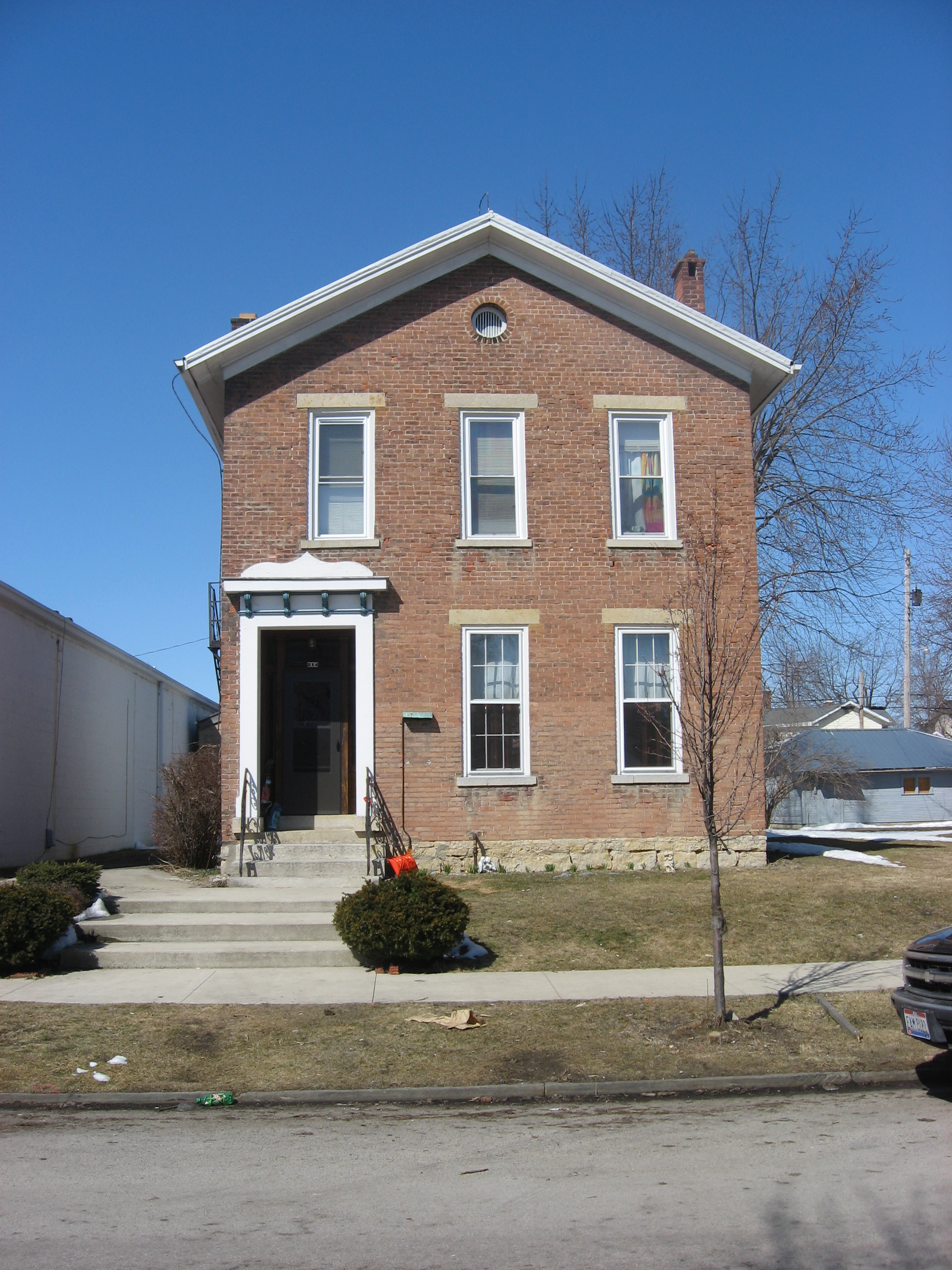
- Front elevation of Anna Beir House

- Location within Ohio Location within the United States
- Location: 214 E. 4th St., Greenville, Ohio
- Coordinates: 40°6′8″N 84°37′47″W
- Area: Less than 1 acre (0.40 ha)
- Built: 1865
- Architect: Conrad Beir
- Architectural style: Late Victorian
- NRHP reference No.: 77001055
- Added to NRHP: April 11, 1977

The Anna Beir House, built in 1865 by Conrad Beir, is a historic two-story redbrick house located at 214 East 4th Street in Greenville, Ohio. Miss Anna Beir was a longtime art teacher in Greenville, who devised the house to the city of Greenville upon her death in the 1930s. It was used by the Greenville Art Guild for many years until a fire in the 1970s. A gallery in the Greenville Carnegie Library is named for Miss Beir. On April 11, 1977, the house was added to the National Register of Historic Places.

When he built the house, Conrad Beir was simultaneously serving as the pastor of the German Methodist Church in Greenville and in business as a tailor. His daughter Anna was born in the house in 1873, and it remained her residence until her death in 1939. The house is a plain brick structure built in a simple rectangular shape, two stories tall; the gabled facade is divided into three bays. Set on a stone foundation, the brick house is topped with a metal roof and features miscellaneous stone elements; it is typical of middle-class residences of the period. For much of her life, Beir was a prominent educator; her thirty-six-year tenure in the city schools gave her a high reputation both locally and in the wider region. Although multiple colleges attempted to win her away, her dedication to Greenville and her influence on the city's residents prompted her to decline all such requests in favor of remaining with her native city.
