= Montblainville =

- Commune
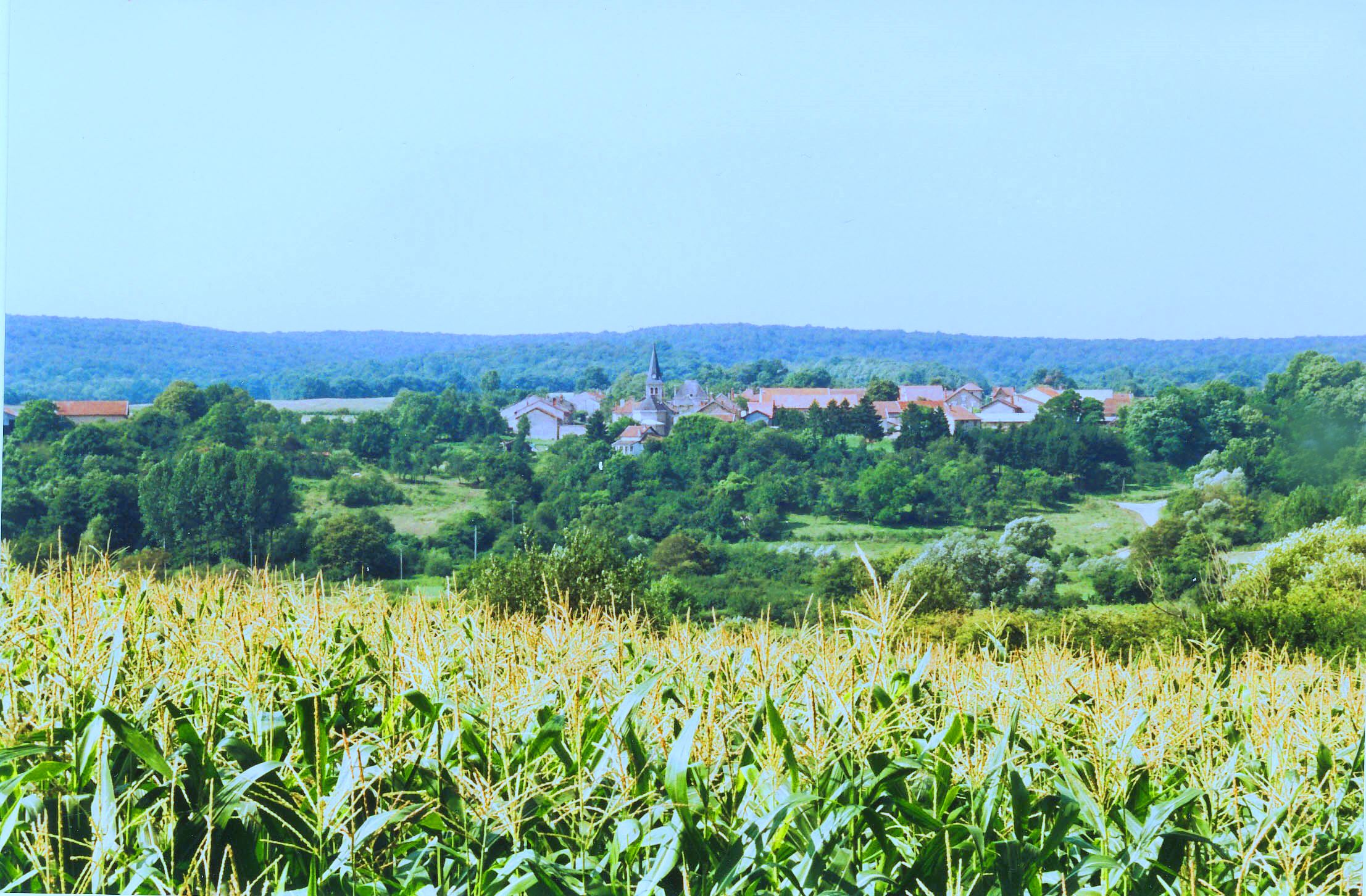
- A general view of Montblainville

- Coat of arms
- Location of Montblainville
- Location within France Location within Grand Est
- Coordinates: 49°14′54″N 5°00′47″E
- Country: France
- Region: Grand Est
- Department: Meuse
- Arrondissement: Verdun
- Canton: Clermont-en-Argonne
- Intercommunality: Argonne-Meuse

Government
  - Mayor (2020–2026): Patrice Pérard
- Area^{1}: 12.06 km^{2} (4.66 sq mi)
- Elevation: 196 m (643 ft)
- Highest elevation: 256 m (840 ft)
- Lowest elevation: 140 m (460 ft)
- Population (2023): 58
  - Density: 4.8/km^{2} (12/sq mi)
- Time zone: UTC+01:00 (CET)
  - Summer (DST): UTC+02:00 (CEST)
- INSEE/Postal code: 55343 /55270
- ^{1} French Land Register data, which excludes lakes, ponds, glaciers > 1 km^{2} (0.386 sq mi or 247 acres) and river estuaries.

Montblainville (French pronunciation: [mɔ̃blɛ̃vil]) is a commune in the Meuse department in Grand Est in north-eastern France.

== See also ==
- Communes of the Meuse department
