= Greenville Mausoleum =

Historic site in Ohio, US

- U.S. National Register of Historic Places
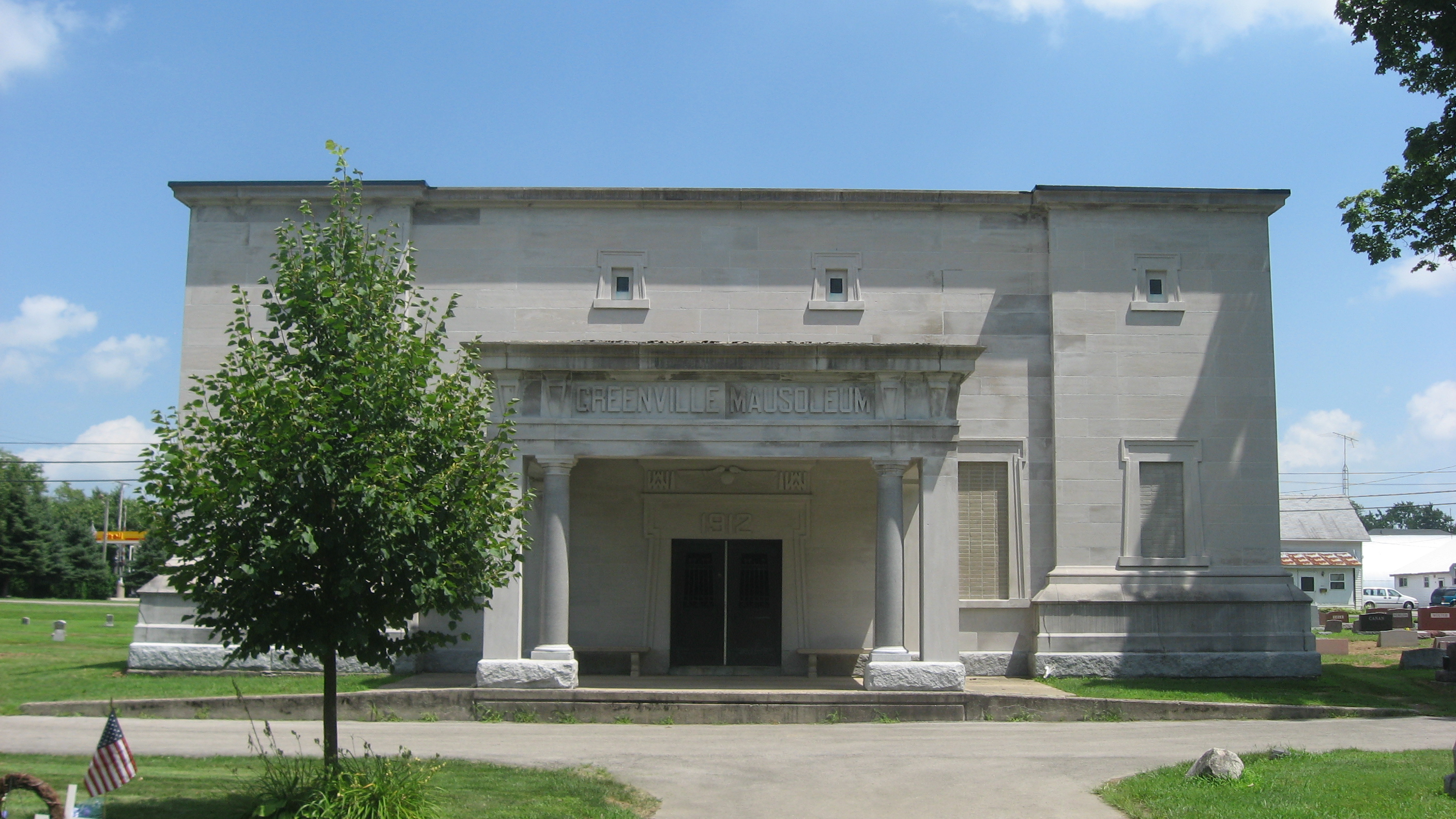
- Front of the mausoleum

- Location within Ohio Location within the United States
- Location: West St. in the Greenville Cemetery, Greenville, Ohio
- Coordinates: 40°6′25″N 84°38′27″W
- Area: 0 acres (0 ha)
- Built: 1913
- Architect: Dr. J.P. Collett
- Architectural style: Second Egyptian Revival
- NRHP reference No.: 76001410
- Added to NRHP: October 21, 1976

The Greenville Mausoleum is an Egyptian Revival structure in Greenville, Ohio, United States. Built in 1913, this historic mausoleum is built of concrete covered with courses of limestone, resting on a foundation of granite and covered with a roof of ceramic tiles. Among its most distinctive elements are the marble pillars, topped with capitals of the Doric order, that line the main entrance. The main portion of the interior, built in a basilican style with multiple aisles, contains approximately four hundred concrete and marble crypts, and the building's wings house individual family crypts. It is lit by twelve clerestory windows under the roofline.

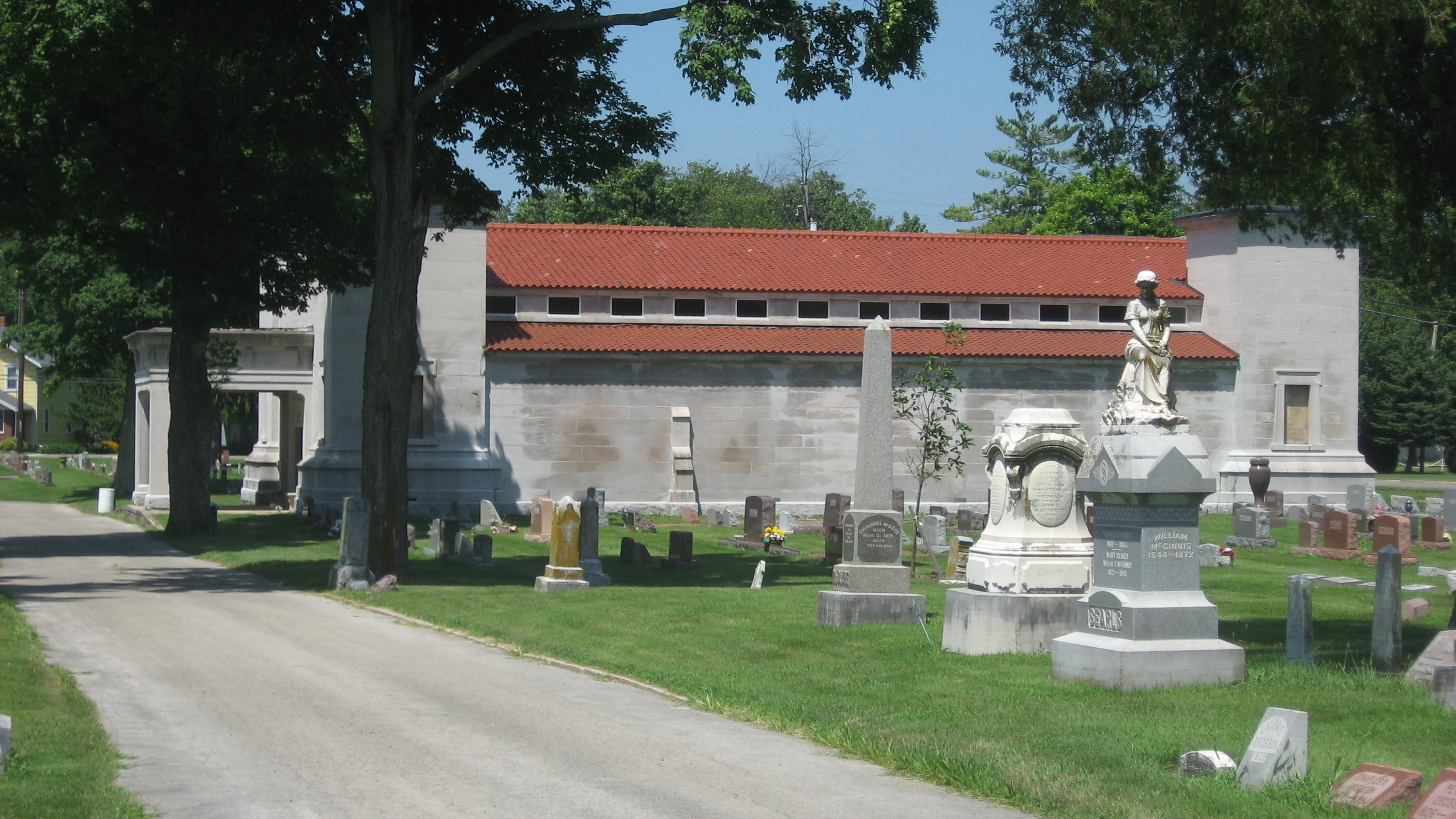
Southern side of the mausoleum

Located along West Street adjacent to the cemetery's main entrance, the mausoleum was the brainchild of local doctor J.P. Collett. He chose a unique design for the structure: no other Egyptian Revival mausolea have been built near Greenville. Most historic cemetery buildings in western Ohio employed other styles of architecture; for example, the mausoleum in Fostoria and the Woodland Cemetery offices in Dayton were built in the Neoclassical and Romanesque Revival styles respectively. In recognition of its distinctive architecture, the mausoleum was listed on the National Register of Historic Places in 1976, being the fourth Darke County site to receive this recognition.
