= William English House =

Historic house in Ohio, United States

- U.S. National Register of Historic Places
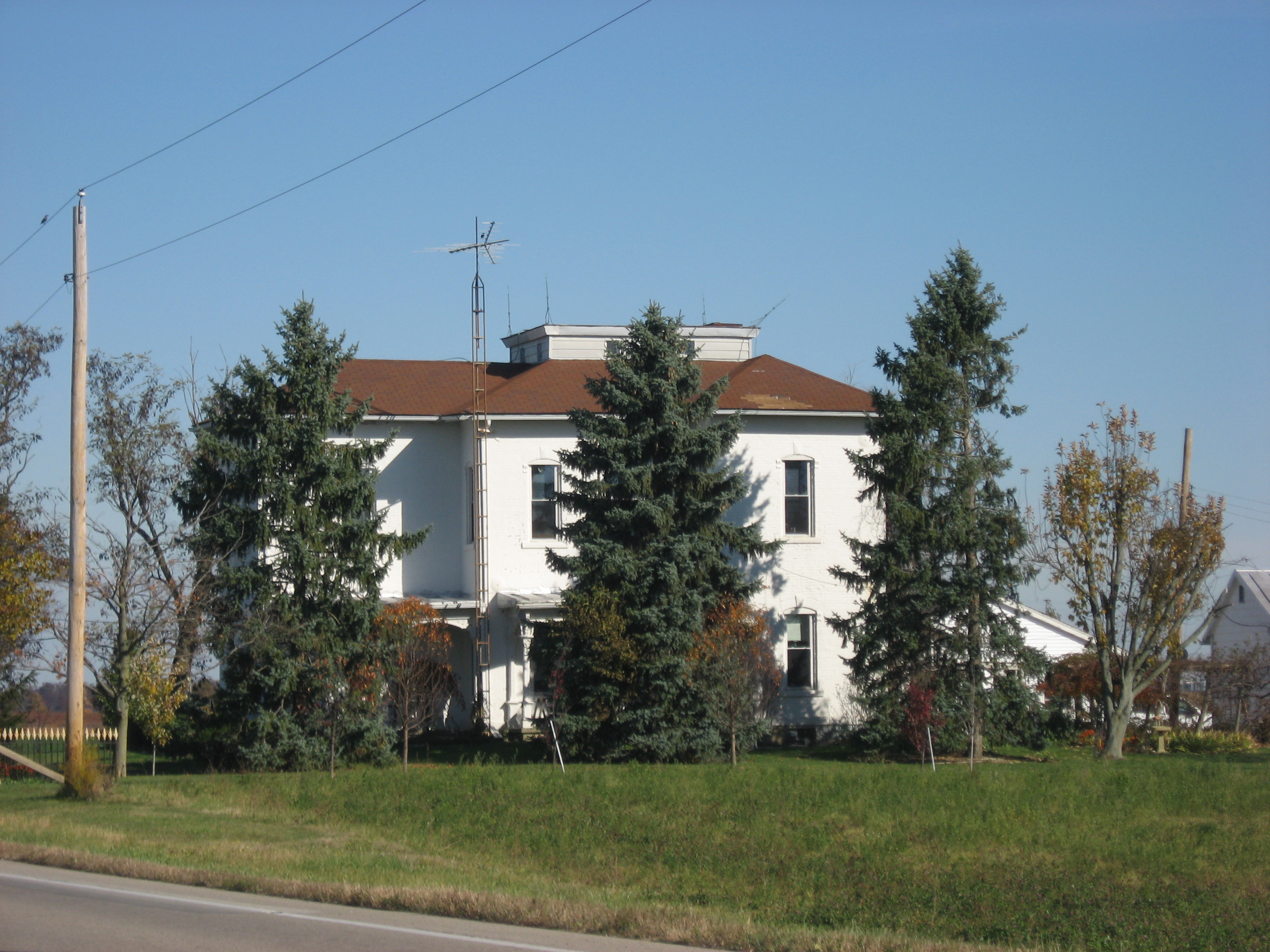
- Southern side of the house

- Location within Ohio Location within the United States
- Location: 11291 State Route 47, Wayne Township, Darke County, Ohio
- Nearest city: Versailles
- Coordinates: 40°15′5″N 84°27′34″W
- Area: less than one acre
- Built: 1881
- Architect: William English
- Architectural style: Italianate
- NRHP reference No.: 82003562
- Added to NRHP: June 2, 1982

The William English House is a historic farmhouse in the far western portion of the U.S. state of Ohio. Located along State Route 47 northeast of the village of Versailles in the northeastern corner of Darke County, the house was built in 1881 as the residence of William English, an astronomically-inclined farmer. English was a native of Ireland who immigrated to the United States in 1823. Besides farming, English operated a brickworks on his property, and his employees generally lived in the same house as his family. Consequently, the house is significantly larger than would have been necessary for the family members alone.

When English erected a new Italianate house in 1881, he ensured that its details aligned with certain astronomical features. Four doors and eight windows on the front (western side) of the house are placed to face exactly westward, and multiple doors on recessed porches on the southern side of the house are placed so that the sun's light illuminates them at noon on a certain day of the year. The house's location atop a small hill overlooking State Route 47 ensures that the light of the sun is more frequently cast upon it.

In 1982, the English House was listed on the National Register of Historic Places because of its well-preserved historic architecture.
