= Greenville Carnegie Library =

- Carnegie Library and Henry St. Clair Memorial Hall
- U.S. National Register of Historic Places
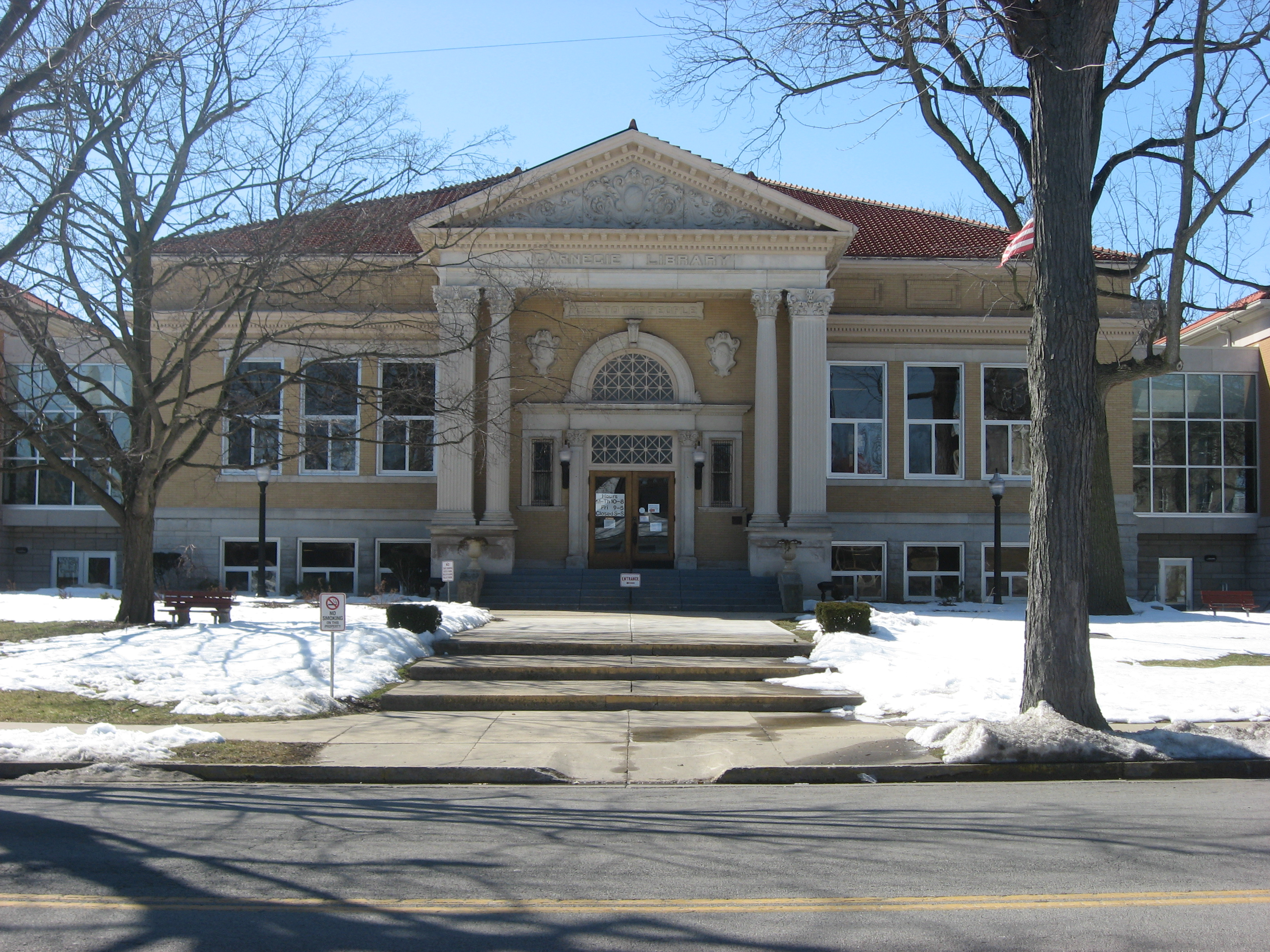
- Front of the library

- Location within Ohio Location within the United States
- Location: 520 Sycamore St. and W. 4th St., Greenville, Ohio
- Coordinates: 40°5′57″N 84°37′59″W
- Area: 4 acres (1.6 ha)
- Built: 1901
- Architect: William S. Kaufman; Howard & Morrison
- NRHP reference No.: 80002986
- Added to NRHP: November 26, 1980

The Greenville Carnegie Library is a historic library on the edge of downtown Greenville, Ohio, United States. A Carnegie library built for the community in the early 20th century, the library and an adjacent school building have been designated a historic site because of their landmark architecture.

== Early history ==
Soon after F. Gillum Cromer became the superintendent of the Greenville city school system in 1888, he began to plan for the creation of a library for the city's students. Financing for the library was largely dependent on the children of the city, who performed entertainments on Washington's Birthday; the monies earned were used to pay for the books and for the upkeep of the library system. As the library increased in size, it was decided to expand it and to open it to members of the public. From 1892 to 1901, the library was housed in the basement of a store on Fifth Street.

== Construction ==
In the spring of 1901, the city's board of education petitioned Andrew Carnegie to donate money for the expansion of the library. In response, Carnegie offered $15,000 on the condition that the city pledge $1,500 annually for its support. After examining the library system in Pittsburgh and consulting its head librarian, the board requested $25,000 and pledged $2,500 annually; Carnegie accepted this offer. After the board accepted bids on plans, the members discovered that the desired structure would cost nearly $30,000 and ordered a revision of the plans; however, when this news reached prominent local businessman Henry St. Clair, he requested that the revision be cancelled and pledged sufficient funds for the building as originally planned. St. Clair's wish having been granted, the library's cornerstone was laid on October 30, 1901, and construction was completed on March 19, 1903; the structure had cost $31,177.50.

== Architecture ==
The Carnegie Library is a rectangular building approximately 90 feet (27 m) long, 70 feet (21 m) wide, and two stories tall. Brick walls, trimmed with oolite, rest on a foundation of Bedford limestone, and the structure is topped with a roof of red tiles. The floors are decorated with multiple frescoes and mosaics, and many stained glass windows illuminate the interior. Patrons are served with marble-finished restrooms on both floors. At the time of construction, the library was ornamented with statues and elaborate wooden panelling.

== Memorial Hall ==
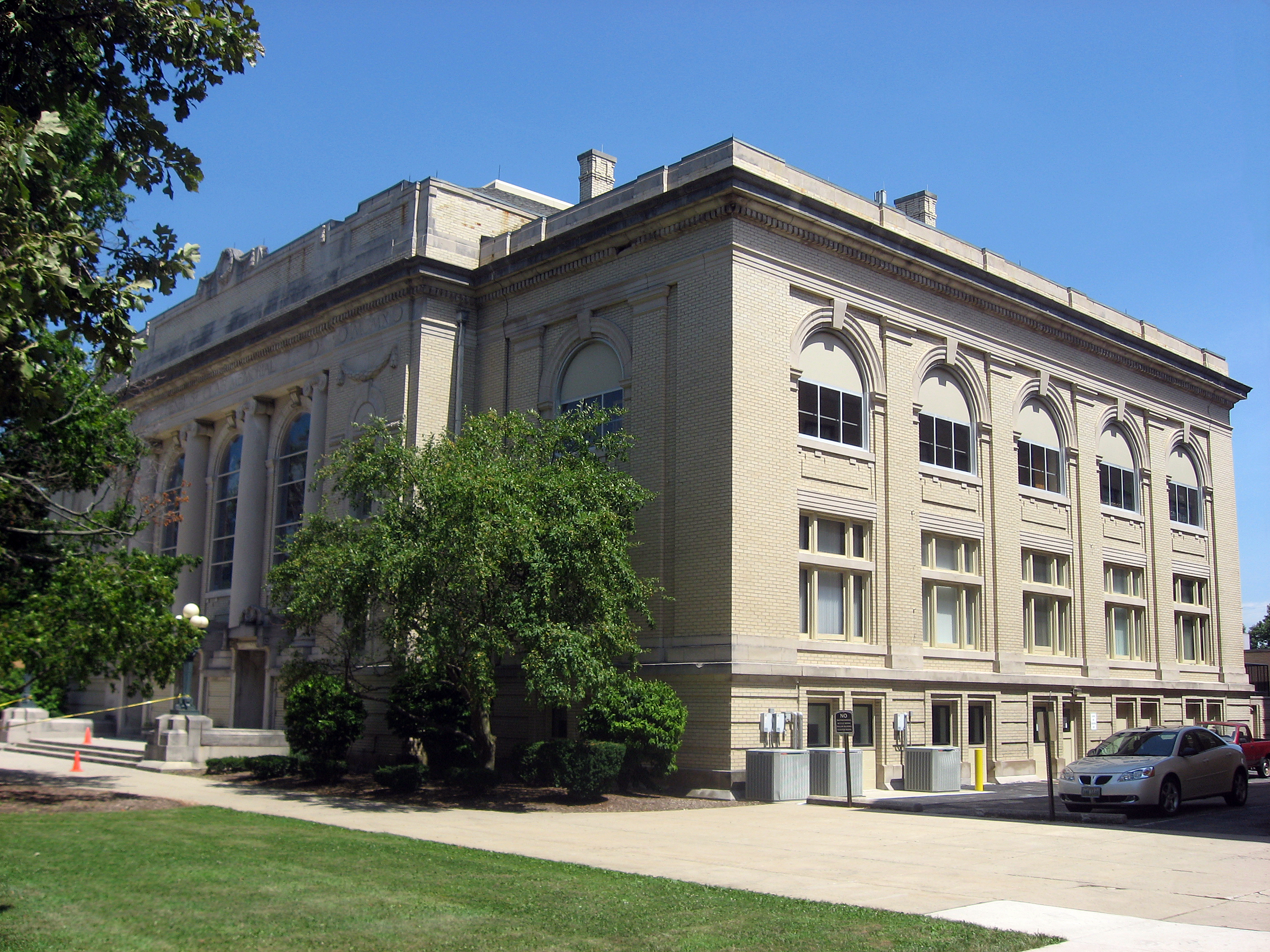
Front of the St. Clair Memorial Hall

Following Henry's St. Clair's death on October 7, 1908, the city benefited greatly from his will — $100,000 was to be given to the city's board of education for the erection and maintenance of an assembly hall for the use of the city schools. Board members soon voted to build this hall adjacent to the Carnegie library; as the 1868 high school already occupied this location, the entire building was moved a short distance to the south in the summer of 1909. Excavation for the new assembly hall commenced in the spring of 1910, and the cornerstone was laid on June 30. Large crowds attended the laying ceremony; an orator from the Grand Lodge of Ohio was the primary speaker, and members of the leading families of Darke County provided patriotic music.

After a long period of construction, the building was dedicated on May 3, 1912, and given the name of "Henry St. Clair Memorial Hall." While the construction of the hall and the removal of the high school had cost $135,000, the board of education was not left impoverished; St. Clair's widow compensated the board for the extra expenses. The finished structure, built of brick and stone in a manner similar to the library, featured a large auditorium and a range of classrooms for the city's students. Soon after construction was completed, the building was opened to the community for events such as political gatherings, religious conventions, and Chautauquas.

== Recognition ==
In 1980, the library and memorial hall were listed on the National Register of Historic Places for their architectural significance. Approximately 4 acres (1.6 ha) of land around the buildings were included in the area designated as historic; much of which has been part of a park created during the process of moving the city high school.
