= Darke County Courthouse, Sheriff's House and Jail =

Local government building in the United States

- Darke County Courthouse, Sheriff's House, And Jail
- U.S. National Register of Historic Places
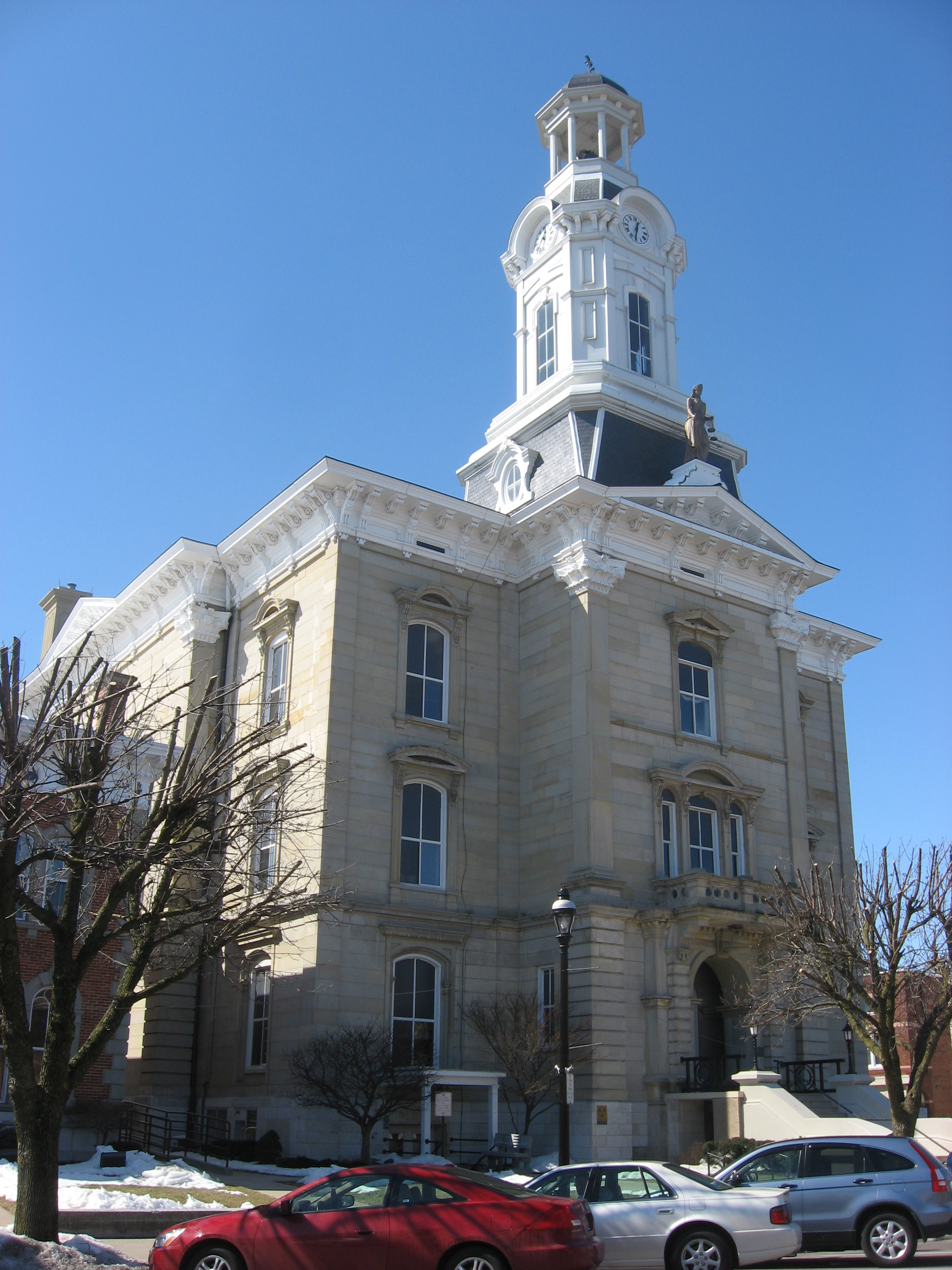
- Front of the courthouse

- Location within Ohio Location within the United States
- Interactive map showing the location of Drake County Courthouse, Sheriff’s House and Jail
- Location: 4th and Broadway, Greenville, Ohio
- Coordinates: 40°6′2″N 84°37′54″W
- Area: less than one acre
- Built: 1870
- Architect: Rouzer & Rouzer; Jonathan Kenny
- Architectural style: Second Empire, Renaissance Revival
- NRHP reference No.: 76001409
- Added to NRHP: December 12, 1976

The Darke County Courthouse, Sheriff's House and Jail are three historic buildings located at 504 South Broadway just south of West 4th Street in Greenville, Ohio. On December 12, 1976, the three buildings of the present courthouse complex were added to the National Register of Historic Places.

== History ==
Darke County was formed in 1809 from parts of Miami County but was not formally organized until 1817. The county seat was placed at Greenville at the site of the old Fort Greenville on West Third Street. The first courthouse was built in 1824 and was a small wooden frame structure. The courts met on the first floor with the clerk's office a jury room on the second. The county remained at this location until the next courthouse was completed in 1834. This older courthouse was converted into a residence after this move.

The courthouse of 1834 was placed in the public square and was designed by architect Allan LaMotte. This square building stood two stories tall with a hipped roof and a cupola rising from the center. This building was deemed to be too small for the county's needs and a new courthouse was planned. This old courthouse would serve as the town hall until it was removed to avoid any potential traffic hazards.

The new courthouse was built in 1874 and was designed by Edwin May. The contracting bids went to Rouser & Rouser from Dayton. The sheriff's house and jail were built in 1870 on the same grounds as the courthouse and served in their roles until a new center was built. Today the sheriff's house is the Courthouse Annex while the old jail behind is used for storage of records and other county items.

== Courthouse ==
The courthouse is designed in the Second Empire style with traces of Italianate style. The rectangular building is lined with Buena Vista sandstone with a rusticated foundation and smooth stones lining the floors above. The windows were designed as arches until long rectangular panels were placed during the renovation. Above each window is a decorative head casing in the shape of an arch or pediment. A central projection on the front facade is topped by a tower. The tower contains the main entrance with pilasters on either side holding a balcony. A pediment rests at the top floor and is surmounted by a statue of Justice. The tower rises to a dome which is capped by a spire. Four stone chimneys line the sides of the courthouse. The flat roof was once a mansard and is supported by a decorative entablature.

== Sheriff's House and Jail ==
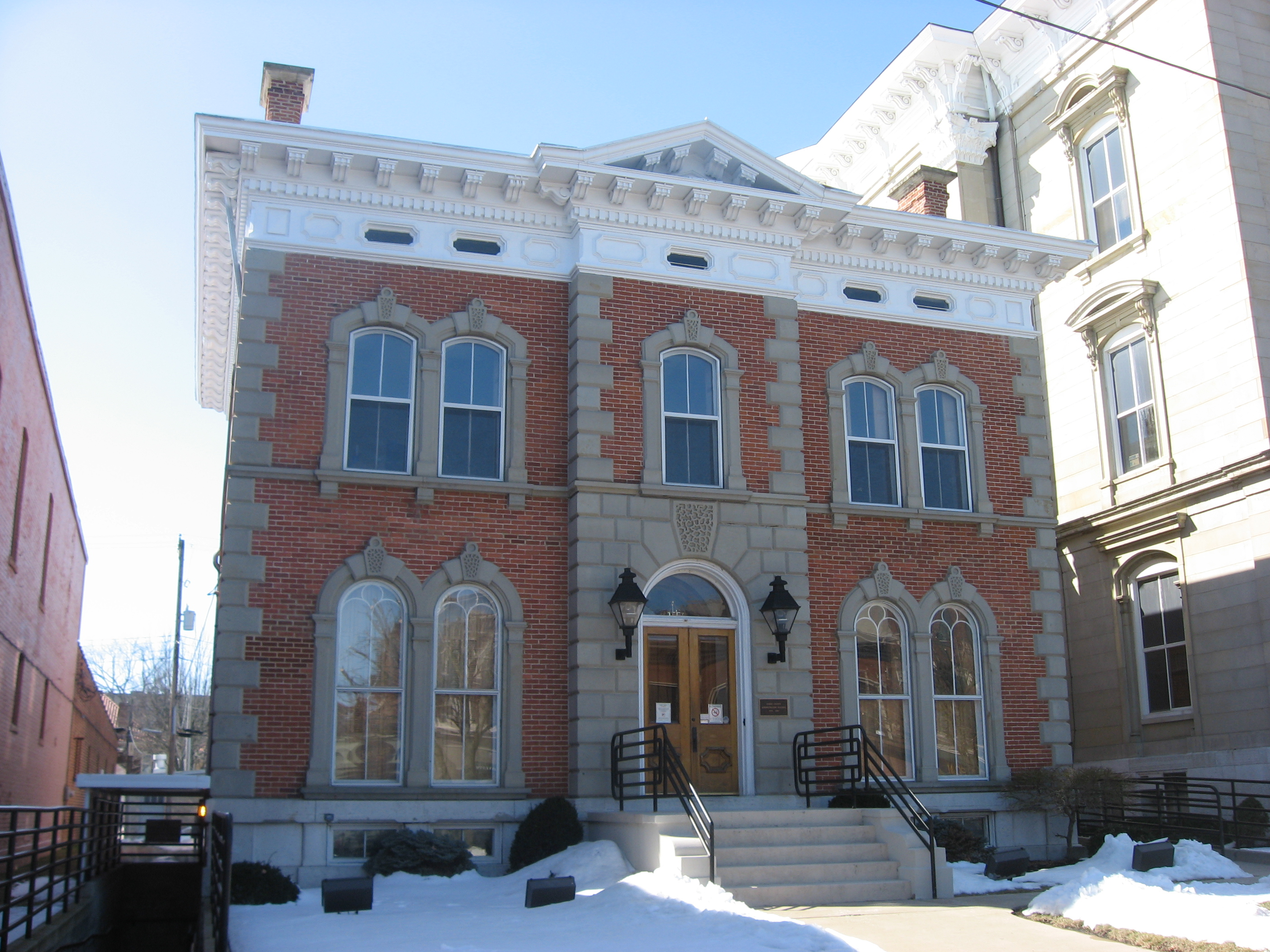
Front of the sheriff's house

The sheriff's residence and the jail located beside the courthouse were built in 1870. The building is designed in the Italianate style. A central projection is flanked by a pair of windows on each floor with quoin edges on the projection and the building's corners. A cornice runs below the roof with geometric shapes including an ellipse, square and oval. The roof overhang contains brackets with three scroll grooves and supports the hipped roof. A pediment rests on the projection and contains an unadorned tympanum.
