= Garst Museum =

Historic house in Ohio, United States

- Garst House
- U.S. National Register of Historic Places
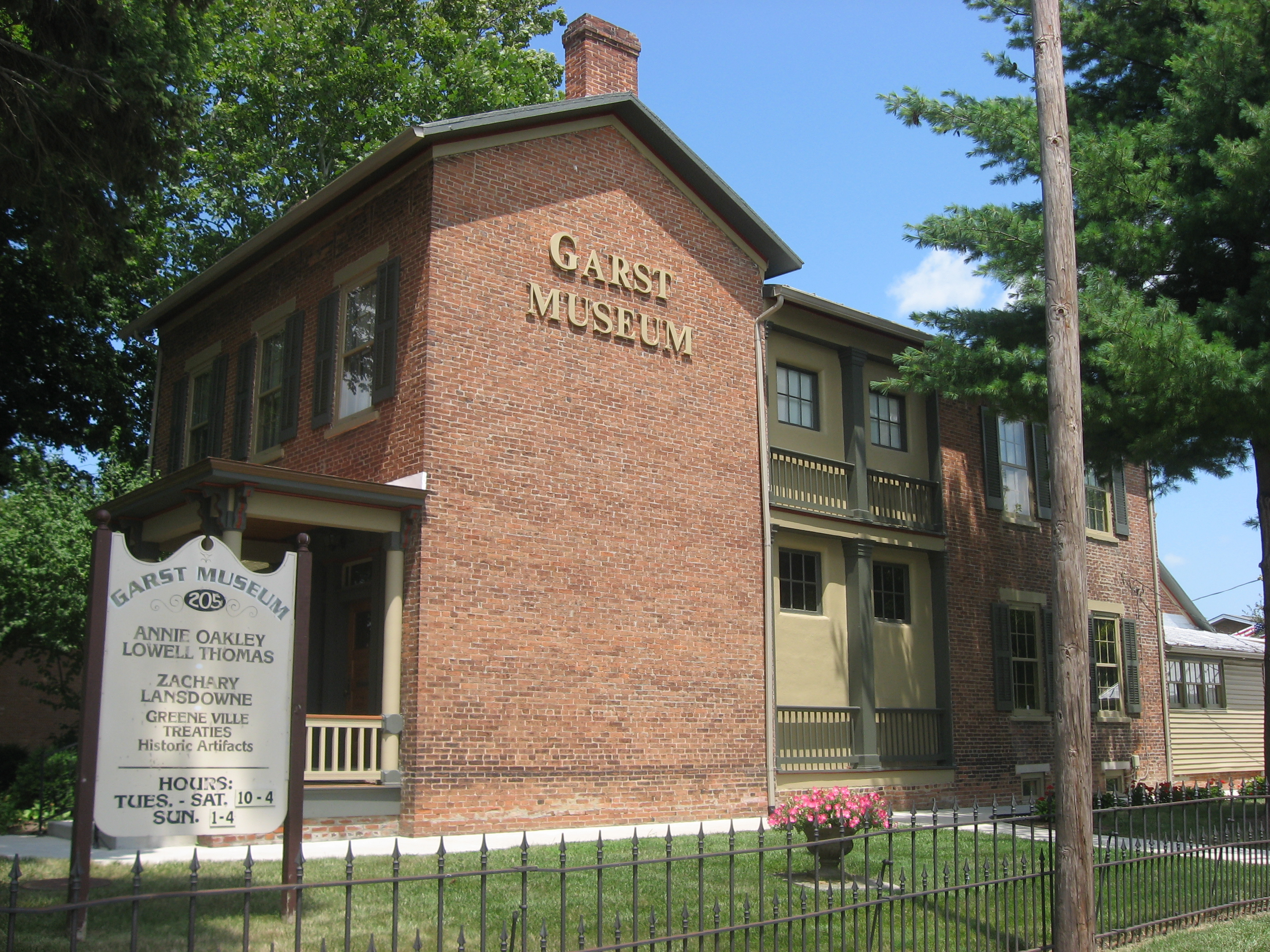
- Side and front of the museum

- Location within Ohio Location within the United States
- Location: 205 N. Broadway, Greenville, Ohio
- Coordinates: 40°6′25″N 84°38′13″W
- Area: less than one acre
- Built: 1852
- Architectural style: Late Victorian
- NRHP reference No.: 77001056
- Added to NRHP: November 16, 1977

The Garst House, also known as the Garst Museum, is an historic building located at 205 North Broadway in Greenville, Ohio, United States. On November 16, 1977, it was added to the National Register of Historic Places. Today it is a local history museum operated by the Darke County Historical Society.

== Museum ==
The Garst Museum contains exhibits about Annie Oakley, Lowell Thomas, Native American culture, local military activities, pioneer life and prehistory. There is also a display of two streets of old village shops. America is presented through a wide range of artifacts. There is a Treaty room with over 1,000 artifacts, including the Treaty of Green Ville. The Lowell Thomas Birthplace was moved to the museum grounds and is open on weekends in the summer. The museum also features a genealogy library operated by the Darke County Genealogical Society and a gift shop.
