= Greenville High School (Ohio) =

Public high school in Greenville, OH, US

Location
- 100 Green Wave Way; Greenville, (Darke County), Ohio 45331; United States
- Coordinates: 40°6′52″N 84°37′55″W

Information
- Type: Public, co-educational high school
- Superintendent: Julie Jones
- Principal: Stanuel Hughes
- Grades: 9–12
- Colors: Green and white
- Athletics conference: Miami Valley League
- Team name: Green Wave
- Accreditation: North Central Association of Colleges and Schools
- Website: www.greenville.k12.oh.us

Greenville High School (GHS) is a high school in Greenville, Ohio, USA. GHS is the only high school in the Greenville City Schools district. Greenville participates in the Miami Valley League (MVL).

== Ohio High School Athletic Association State Championships ==
- Girls' softball - 2007

== Alumni ==
- Matt Light, three-time Super Bowl winner as offensive tackle with the New England Patriots. His high school number, 87, has been retired.
- Jack Baldschun, nine-year Major League baseball pitcher for the Philadelphia Phillies, Cincinnati Reds and San Diego Padres.
- Ed Olwine, three-year Major League Baseball pitcher for the Atlanta Braves.
