= Leftwich House =

Historic house in Ohio, United States

- U.S. National Register of Historic Places
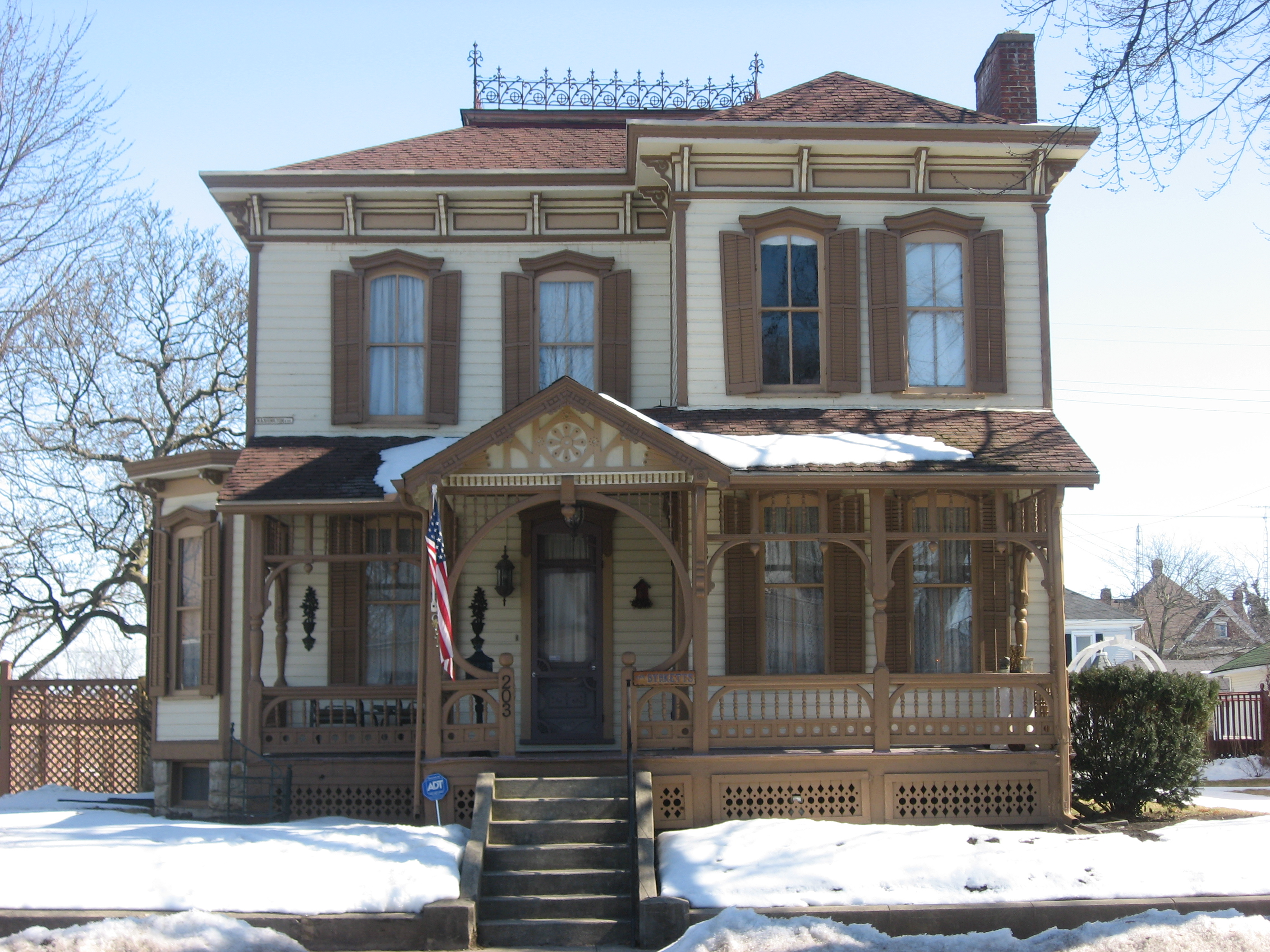
- Front of the house

- Location within Ohio Location within the United States
- Location: 203 S. Washington St., Greenville, Ohio
- Coordinates: 40°5′54″N 84°37′48″W
- Area: less than one acre
- Built: 1875
- Architectural style: Italianate, Stick-Eastlake
- NRHP reference No.: 75001373
- Added to NRHP: October 21, 1975

The Leftwich House is a historic house in Greenville, Ohio, United States. Built in 1875, the house features a combination of the Italianate and Stick-Eastlake styles. A frame structure built upon a foundation of stone, it was one of the most well-preserved Stick-Eastlake houses in Greenville and the surrounding area, with a porch that has been described as "outstanding" and a gable that is ornamented by specifically Stick elements.

Unfortunately, as of May 2021, the house has fallen into disrepair, with shutters hanging askew or missing, the exposed wood is noticeably rotting and exterior paint peeling and bubbled all over.

The house's floor plan is unusual; its four-bay western facade is divided between two components of two bays each; through the northern component, one may enter the house through a Victorian front door. An Eastlake porch shelters the rear door that opens onto the protruding kitchen, and various eaves elsewhere on the exterior form separate cornices, each of which is composed of brackets and a frieze. Covering the house is a hip roof, which consists primarily of shingles.

In 1975, the Leftwich House was listed on the National Register of Historic Places because of its excellent architecture. Although the house's history included no distinctive events or residents, its architecture was rare enough to qualify it for listing.
