= Greenville, Ohio =

Greenville
- City
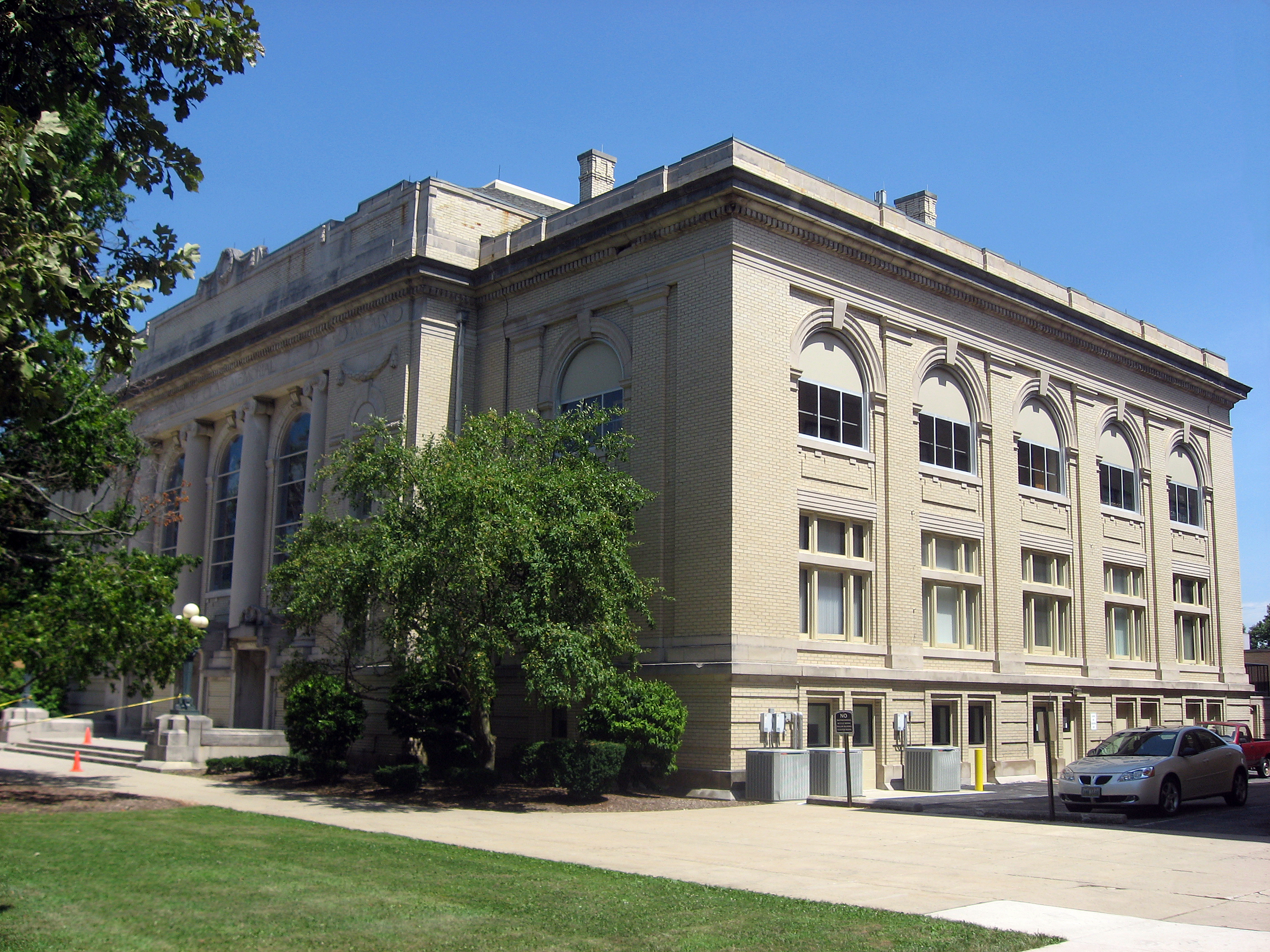
- Henry St. Clair Memorial Hall
- Nickname: "The Treaty City"
- Interactive map of Greenville
- Location within Ohio Location within the United States
- Coordinates: 40°07′10″N 84°37′33″W
- Country: United States
- State: Ohio
- County: Darke

Government
  - Mayor: Jeff Whitaker

Area
  - Total: 6.71 sq mi (17.39 km^{2})
  - Land: 6.65 sq mi (17.23 km^{2})
  - Water: 0.062 sq mi (0.16 km^{2})
- Elevation: 1,004 ft (306 m)

Population (2020)
  - Total: 12,786
  - Estimate (2023): 12,696
  - Density: 1,922.0/sq mi (742.09/km^{2})
- Time zone: UTC-5 (Eastern (EST))
  - Summer (DST): UTC-4 (EDT)
- ZIP code: 45331
- Area codes: 937, 326
- FIPS code: 39-32340
- GNIS feature ID: 2394994
- Website: cityofgreenville.org

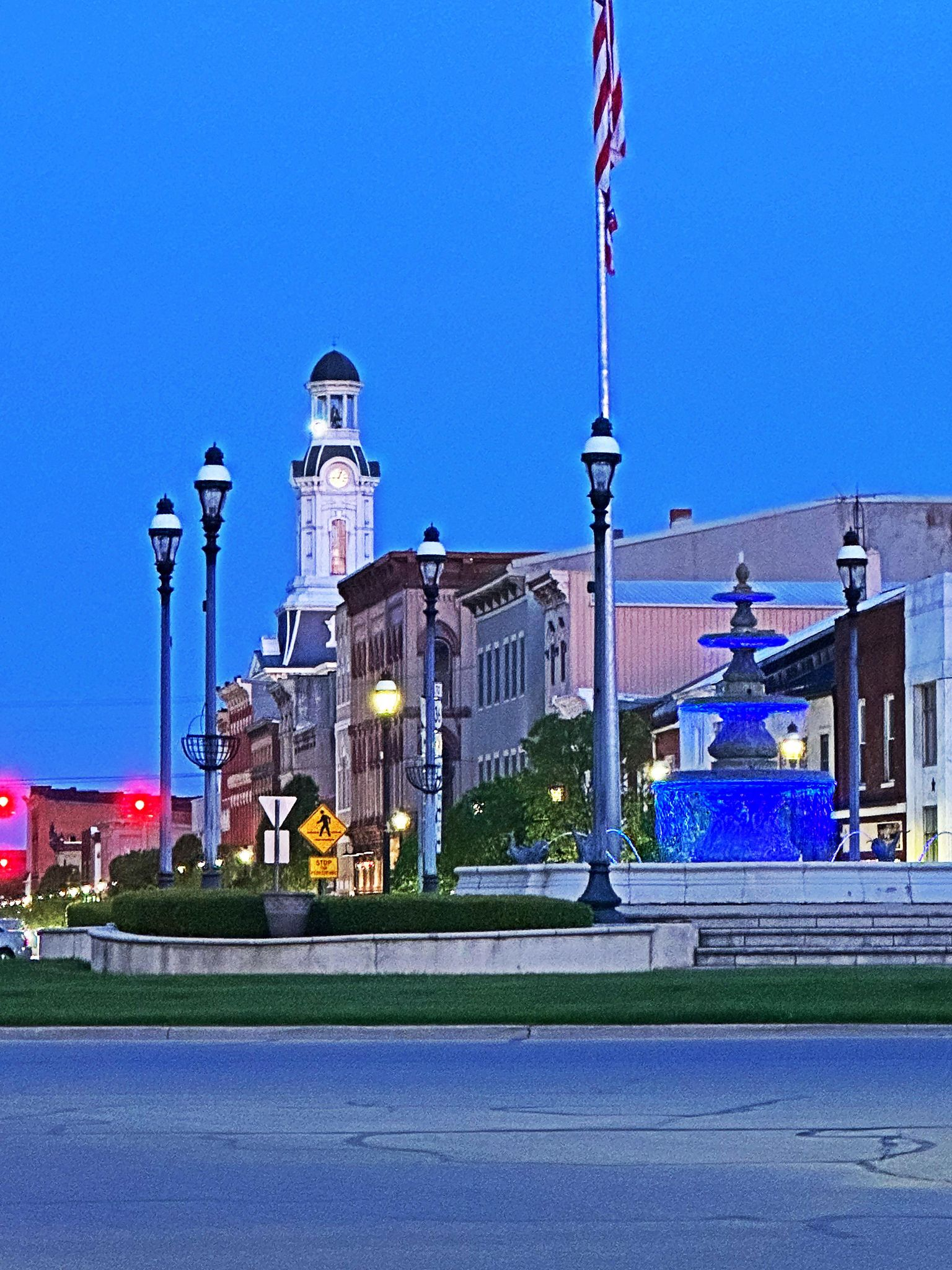
View of fountain and Courthouse

Greenville is a city in Darke County, Ohio, United States, and its county seat. It is near Ohio's western edge, about 33 miles (53 km) northwest of Dayton. The population was 12,786 at the 2020 census.

== History ==
Indigenous tribes in the region included the Wyandot, the Delaware, the Shawnee, the Ottawa, the Chippewa, the Pottawatomi, the Miami, the Wea, the Kickapoo, the Piankasha, the Kaskaskia and the Eel River. These participated in the Northwest Indian War, their effort to repel European Americans from the Northwest Territory.

Greenville is the historic location of Fort Greene Ville, built in November 1793 by General Anthony Wayne's Legion of the United States during the Northwest Indian War. Named for Revolutionary War hero Nathaniel Greene, its defenses covered about 55 acres (220,000 m^{2}), making it North America's largest wooden fort. It was a training ground and base of operations for the approximately 3,000 soldiers of the Legion and Kentucky Militia before their August 1794 march northward to the Battle of Fallen Timbers. The Treaty of Greenville was signed at the fort on August 3, 1795, with chiefs of the tribes that had confronted the U.S. This brought an end to the Indian wars in the area and opened the Northwest Territory for European-American settlement.

In 1805 or 1806, the Shawnee chief Tecumseh and his younger brother Tenskwatawa established an illegal settlement in Greenville. (Note: A different account places an initial settlement by Tecumseh on Buck Creek, Ohio followed by a 1798 move to the west fork of the White River in Indiana) In peaceful protest of the boundary line of the Treaty of Greenville, their group occupied the confluence of Mud Creek and Greenville Creek until 1808. Under pressure from Indiana territorial governor William Henry Harrison and the burgeoning population of settlers, Tecumseh, Tenskwatawa, and their followers relocated to Prophetstown, Indiana, near which the intertribal confederacy was shattered at the Battle of Tippecanoe. Tenskwatawa visited Greenville by request in 1826 as he accompanied the Shawnee during their removal by the U.S. Army.

The Army abandoned Fort Greenville in 1796; it was partly burned later that year to retrieve nails used in its construction. Local settlers carried away some of its logs for building the new settlement of Dayton, Ohio, to the south. In the War of 1812, the Army refitted what remained of the fort; it was used as a supply depot and staging area. The earliest European-American settlers came in 1807; the city of Greenville was officially founded in August 1808.

== Geography ==
According to the United States Census Bureau, the city has an area of 6.66 square miles (17.25 km^{2}), of which 6.60 square miles (17.09 km^{2}) is land and 0.06 square miles (0.16 km^{2}) is water.

Local airports include Darke County Airport, seven miles away in Versailles, and James M. Cox Dayton International Airport, 35 miles away in Dayton, Ohio.

=== Climate ===
Climate data for Greenville, Ohio (1991–2020 normals, extremes 1893–present)
Month	Jan	Feb	Mar	Apr	May	Jun	Jul	Aug	Sep	Oct	Nov	Dec	Year
Record high °F (°C)	71 (22)	75 (24)	85 (29)	90 (32)	98 (37)	101 (38)	105 (41)	101 (38)	100 (38)	90 (32)	80 (27)	72 (22)	105 (41)
Mean maximum °F (°C)	57.4 (14.1)	61.5 (16.4)	71.2 (21.8)	80.5 (26.9)	87.0 (30.6)	91.6 (33.1)	91.9 (33.3)	90.8 (32.7)	89.6 (32.0)	82.8 (28.2)	69.7 (20.9)	60.1 (15.6)	93.5 (34.2)
Mean daily maximum °F (°C)	35.1 (1.7)	39.1 (3.9)	49.6 (9.8)	62.8 (17.1)	73.2 (22.9)	81.6 (27.6)	84.6 (29.2)	83.3 (28.5)	78.1 (25.6)	65.6 (18.7)	51.6 (10.9)	39.8 (4.3)	62.0 (16.7)
Daily mean °F (°C)	27.0 (−2.8)	30.2 (−1.0)	39.9 (4.4)	51.6 (10.9)	62.5 (16.9)	71.2 (21.8)	74.1 (23.4)	72.2 (22.3)	65.7 (18.7)	54.0 (12.2)	42.1 (5.6)	32.2 (0.1)	51.9 (11.1)
Mean daily minimum °F (°C)	19.0 (−7.2)	21.4 (−5.9)	30.2 (−1.0)	40.3 (4.6)	51.7 (10.9)	60.9 (16.1)	63.6 (17.6)	61.1 (16.2)	53.4 (11.9)	42.4 (5.8)	32.6 (0.3)	24.6 (−4.1)	41.8 (5.4)
Mean minimum °F (°C)	−7.1 (−21.7)	−0.3 (−17.9)	10.7 (−11.8)	24.5 (−4.2)	35.5 (1.9)	46.5 (8.1)	51.7 (10.9)	49.0 (9.4)	38.6 (3.7)	26.9 (−2.8)	17.4 (−8.1)	5.4 (−14.8)	−9.8 (−23.2)
Record low °F (°C)	−33 (−36)	−23 (−31)	−14 (−26)	10 (−12)	23 (−5)	36 (2)	43 (6)	36 (2)	26 (−3)	14 (−10)	−2 (−19)	−21 (−29)	−33 (−36)
Average precipitation inches (mm)	2.84 (72)	2.23 (57)	3.23 (82)	4.18 (106)	4.31 (109)	4.42 (112)	3.95 (100)	3.40 (86)	2.75 (70)	2.90 (74)	3.17 (81)	2.88 (73)	40.26 (1,023)
Average precipitation days (≥ 0.01 in)	11.6	9.6	11.4	13.0	12.7	11.9	9.7	8.1	8.4	9.3	9.2	10.4	125.3
Source: NOAA

== Demographics ==
Historical population
Census	Pop.	Note	%±
1840	793		—
1850	1,045		31.8%
1860	1,650		57.9%
1870	2,520		52.7%
1880	3,535		40.3%
1890	5,473		54.8%
1900	5,501		0.5%
1910	6,237		13.4%
1920	7,104		13.9%
1930	7,036		−1.0%
1940	7,745		10.1%
1950	8,859		14.4%
1960	10,585		19.5%
1970	12,380		17.0%
1980	13,002		5.0%
1990	12,863		−1.1%
2000	13,294		3.4%
2010	13,227		−0.5%
2020	12,786		−3.3%
2023 (est.)	12,696		−0.7%

=== 2020 census ===
As of the 2020 census, Greenville had a population of 12,786. The median age was 46.6 years. 19.8% of residents were under the age of 18 and 26.2% of residents were 65 years of age or older. For every 100 females there were 89.7 males, and for every 100 females age 18 and over there were 84.9 males age 18 and over.

99.9% of residents lived in urban areas, while 0.1% lived in rural areas.

There were 5,995 households in Greenville, of which 21.3% had children under the age of 18 living in them. Of all households, 34.0% were married-couple households, 21.8% were households with a male householder and no spouse or partner present, and 36.2% were households with a female householder and no spouse or partner present. About 43.0% of all households were made up of individuals and 22.9% had someone living alone who was 65 years of age or older.

There were 6,557 housing units, of which 8.6% were vacant. The homeowner vacancy rate was 2.0% and the rental vacancy rate was 5.7%.

Racial composition as of the 2020 census
Race	Number	Percent
White	11,923	93.3%
Black or African American	136	1.1%
American Indian and Alaska Native	28	0.2%
Asian	96	0.8%
Native Hawaiian and Other Pacific Islander	7	0.1%
Some other race	112	0.9%
Two or more races	484	3.8%
Hispanic or Latino (of any race)	265	2.1%

=== 2010 census ===
As of the census of 2010, there were 13,227 people, 5,933 households, and 3,430 families living in the city. The population density was 2,004.1 inhabitants per square mile (773.8/km^{2}). There were 6,536 housing units at an average density of 990.3 per square mile (382.4/km^{2}). The racial makeup of the city was 96.7% White, 0.9% African American, 0.2% Native American, 0.7% Asian, 0.3% from other races, and 1.1% from two or more races. Hispanic or Latino of any race were 1.4% of the population.

There were 5,933 households, of which 26.3% had children under the age of 18 living with them, 41.2% were married couples living together, 12.0% had a female householder with no husband present, 4.7% had a male householder with no wife present, and 42.2% were non-families. 37.5% of all households were made up of individuals, and 19.4% had someone living alone who was 65 years of age or older. The average household size was 2.17, and the average family size was 2.83.

The median age in the city was 43.4 years. 21.5% of residents were under the age of 18; 8.4% were between the ages of 18 and 24; 21.8% were from 25 to 44; 25.6% were from 45 to 64, and 22.5% were 65 years of age or older. The gender makeup of the city was 46.0% male and 54.0% female.

=== 2000 census ===
As of the census of 2000, there were 13,294 people, 5,649 households, and 3,462 families living in the city. The population density was 2,206.4 inhabitants per square mile (851.9/km^{2}). There were 6,030 housing units at an average density of 1,000.8 per square mile (386.4/km^{2}). The racial makeup of the city was 97.31% White, 0.56% African American, 0.17% Native American, 0.53% Asian, 0.02% Pacific Islander, 0.44% from other races, and 0.97% from two or more races. Hispanic or Latino of any race were 1.14% of the population.

There were 5,649 households, out of which 27.3% had children living with them, 46.5% were married couples living together, 11.0% had a female householder with no husband present, and 38.7% were non-families. 34.4% of all households were made up of individuals, and 16.9% had someone living alone who was 65 years of age or older. The average household size was 2.23, and the average family size was 2.85.

In the city, the population was spread out, with 22.7% under the age of 18, 8.3% from 18 to 24, 25.4% from 25 to 44, 20.9% from 45 to 64, and 22.7% who were 65 years of age or older. The median age was 40 years. For every 100 females, there were 84.1 males. For every 100 females age 18 and over, there were 78.6 males.

The median income for a household in the city was $31,791, and the median income for a family was $38,699. Males had a median income of $33,143 versus $24,875 for females. The per capita income for the city was $18,830. About 10.2% of families and 13.4% of the population were below the poverty line, including 18.8% of those under age 18 and 14.6% of those age 65 or over.

== Economy ==
Various companies and brands such as KitchenAid and BASF North America have offices in Greenville.

== Education ==
The city is home to Greenville High School.

== Arts and culture ==
Greenville hosts the Darke County Fair, which runs annually for nine days in August.

Built in 1849, the historic Bear's Mill is an example of a stonegrinding flour mill of its time. Placed on the National Register of Historic Places in 1977, it is used today to grind cornmeal, whole-wheat flour, rye flour, and pancake mixes. The mill and the buhr stones are powered by water. Self-guided tours may be taken during regular business hours.

Greenville has a local history museum, the Garst Museum, which features the most extensive known collections of memorabilia of Annie Oakley and Lowell Thomas, both of whom were born nearby. It also holds historical artifacts relating to Anthony Wayne and the Treaty of Greenville, as well as Native American artifacts.

The museum also includes a village of shops; a wing of early American furnishings, pioneer life, and military uniforms; an early Indianapolis 500 race car built in Greenville; and an extensive genealogy room for research. Also in Greenville is St. Clair Memorial Hall, Darke County's center for the arts. Built in 1910, it has been completely remodeled and is a showpiece for all of Darke County.

Greenville was the site of the fourth investigation of the television series To Catch A Predator. Over three days in 2006, 18 men were arrested, with Darke County officers assisting the Dateline NBC crew. This investigation was credited with shining a light on online predation, even in rural areas, and is often cited as the episode that cemented To Catch A Predator in popular culture.

== Media ==
The city and surrounding areas are served by a daily newspaper published in Greenville, The Daily Advocate.

== Notable people ==
- Jack Baldschun, baseball player
- Jack Curtner, racing driver
- Jeffrey D. Feltman, United Nations diplomat
- Ray Hathaway, baseball player
- Walter Law, film and stage actor
- Matt Light, American football player
- Rick Macci, tennis coach
- Clayton Murphy, Olympian
- Paul Norris, comic book artist
- Annie Oakley, American sharpshooter
- Bob Peebles, Scottish-American professional golfer
- Gene Riegle, harness racing driver and trainer
- Lowell Thomas, writer and broadcaster
- Jim Van Bebber, film director
