= National Register of Historic Places listings in Mercer County, Ohio =

Location of Mercer County in Ohio

This is a list of the National Register of Historic Places listings in Mercer County, Ohio.

This is intended to be a complete list of the properties and districts on the National Register of Historic Places in Mercer County, Ohio, United States. The locations of National Register properties and districts for which the latitude and longitude coordinates are included below, may be seen in an online map.

There are 30 properties and districts listed on the National Register in the county.

This National Park Service list is complete through NPS recent listings posted April 10, 2026.

== Current listings ==
	Name on the Register	Image	Date listed	Location	City or town	Description
1	Cassella Catholic Church and Rectory	Cassella Catholic Church and Rectory	July 26, 1979 (#79002822)	State Route 119 in Cassella; 40°24′24″N 84°33′03″W	Marion Township	
2	Celina Main Street Commercial Historic District	Celina Main Street Commercial Historic District	November 30, 1982 (#82001474)	Roughly bounded by Walnut, W. Livingston, Ash, and Warren Sts. 40°32′58″N 84°34′15″W	Celina	
3	Chickasaw School and Rectory	Chickasaw School and Rectory	July 26, 1979 (#79002848)	Maple St. 40°26′10″N 84°29′35″W	Chickasaw	
4	Coldwater Catholic Church Complex	Coldwater Catholic Church Complex	July 26, 1979 (#79002832)	E. Main and 2nd Sts. 40°28′49″N 84°37′42″W	Coldwater	
5	Fort Recovery Site	Fort Recovery Site	November 10, 1970 (#70000509)	State Route 49; 40°24′50″N 84°46′51″W	Fort Recovery	
6	Matthias Gast House and General Store	Matthias Gast House and General Store	December 29, 1978 (#78002139)	State Route 119 in Maria Stein; 40°24′28″N 84°28′13″W	Marion Township	
7	Sen. Thomas J. Godfrey House	Sen. Thomas J. Godfrey House	November 26, 1980 (#80003159)	602 W. Market St. 40°32′56″N 84°34′50″W	Celina	
8	Grand Lake St. Marys Lighthouse	Grand Lake St. Marys Lighthouse	June 2, 1982 (#82003614)	Grand Lake St. Marys-Northwood Addition, east of Celina; 40°32′36″N 84°28′53″W	Jefferson Township	
9	Gruenwald Convent	Gruenwald Convent	July 26, 1979 (#79002813)	0.5 miles south of Cassella; 40°24′01″N 84°33′03″W	Marion Township	
10	Immaculate Conception Catholic Church Complex	Immaculate Conception Catholic Church Complex	July 26, 1979 (#79002833)	Anthony and Walnut Sts. 40°33′07″N 84°34′22″W	Celina	
11	Maria Stein Catholic Church and Rectory	Maria Stein Catholic Church and Rectory	July 26, 1979 (#79002828)	St. John's Rd. and State Route 119 in Maria Stein; 40°24′29″N 84°28′22″W	Marion Township	
12	Maria Stein Convent	Maria Stein Convent	May 6, 1976 (#76001490)	St. John's and Rolfes Rd. in Maria Stein; 40°24′57″N 84°28′34″W	Marion Township	
13	Mendon Town Hall	Mendon Town Hall	December 29, 1978 (#78002140)	S. Main St. 40°40′23″N 84°31′07″W	Mendon	
14	Morvilius Opera House	Morvilius Opera House	February 3, 2022 (#100007396)	101 North Wayne St. 40°24′48″N 84°46′47″W	Fort Recovery	
15	Otis Hospital	Otis Hospital	November 25, 1980 (#80003160)	441 E. Market St. 40°32′58″N 84°33′52″W	Celina	
16	Philothea Catholic Church and Priest House	Philothea Catholic Church and Priest House	July 26, 1979 (#79002823)	Philothea Rd. in Philothea, between St. Henry and Coldwater; 40°27′03″N 84°39′18″W	Butler Township	
17	Calvin E. Riley House	Calvin E. Riley House	November 30, 1978 (#78002137)	130 E. Market St. 40°32′55″N 84°34′10″W	Celina	
18	St. Aloysius Catholic Church	St. Aloysius Catholic Church	July 26, 1979 (#79002824)	U.S. Route 127 and State Route 274, west of Carthagena; 40°26′11″N 84°34′12″W	Marion Township	
19	St. Anthony Catholic Church, Padua	St. Anthony Catholic Church, Padua	July 26, 1979 (#79002821)	State Route 49 and St. Anthony Rd. in Padua; 40°30′32″N 84°47′07″W	Washington Township	
20	St. Bernard Catholic Church and Rectory	St. Bernard Catholic Church and Rectory	July 26, 1979 (#79002842)	Main St. 40°21′08″N 84°38′45″W	Burkettsville	
21	St. Charles Seminary and Chapel	St. Charles Seminary and Chapel	July 26, 1979 (#79002840)	0.5 miles south of Carthagena, off U.S. Route 127; 40°25′57″N 84°33′48″W	Marion Township	
22	St. Francis Catholic Church and Rectory	St. Francis Catholic Church and Rectory	July 26, 1979 (#79002837)	Cranberry and Ft. Recovery-Minster Rd. in Cranberry Prairie; 40°23′34″N 84°34′55″W	Granville Township	
23	St. Henry Catholic Church	St. Henry Catholic Church	July 26, 1979 (#79002829)	Main St. 40°25′03″N 84°38′15″W	St. Henry	
24	St. Joseph Catholic Church and Rectory	St. Joseph Catholic Church and Rectory	July 26, 1979 (#79002820)	Sawmill and St. Joe Rds. in St. Joe; 40°25′41″N 84°44′19″W	Recovery Township	
25	St. Paul's Catholic Church and Rectory	St. Paul's Catholic Church and Rectory	July 26, 1979 (#79002827)	Junction of Sharpsburg and Meiring Rds. in Sharpsburg; 40°22′02″N 84°42′41″W	Gibson Township	
26	St. Peter Catholic Church and Rectory	St. Peter Catholic Church and Rectory	July 26, 1979 (#79002831)	St. Peter and Philothea Rds. in St. Peter; 40°27′03″N 84°44′48″W	Recovery Township	
27	St. Rose Catholic Church Complex	St. Rose Catholic Church Complex	July 26, 1979 (#79002838)	Main St. in St. Rose; 40°24′26″N 84°30′53″W	Marion Township	
28	St. Sebastian Catholic Church and Rectory	St. Sebastian Catholic Church and Rectory	July 26, 1979 (#79002830)	Sebastian Rd. and State Route 716A in St. Sebastian; 40°26′39″N 84°31′00″W	Marion Township	
29	St. Wendelin Catholic Church, School, and Rectory	St. Wendelin Catholic Church, School, and Rectory	July 26, 1979 (#79002885)	Ft. Recovery-Minster Rd. and Township Line in Wendelin; 40°24′00″N 84°41′27″W	Recovery Township	
30	Wallischeck Homestead	Wallischeck Homestead	November 27, 1978 (#78002138)	North of Fort Recovery; 40°26′40″N 84°48′05″W	Recovery Township	

== See also ==
- List of National Historic Landmarks in Ohio
- Listings in neighboring counties: Adams (IN), Auglaize, Darke, Jay (IN), Shelby, Van Wert
- National Register of Historic Places listings in Ohio
