= Jackson Township, Darke County, Ohio =

Township in Ohio, US

- Township
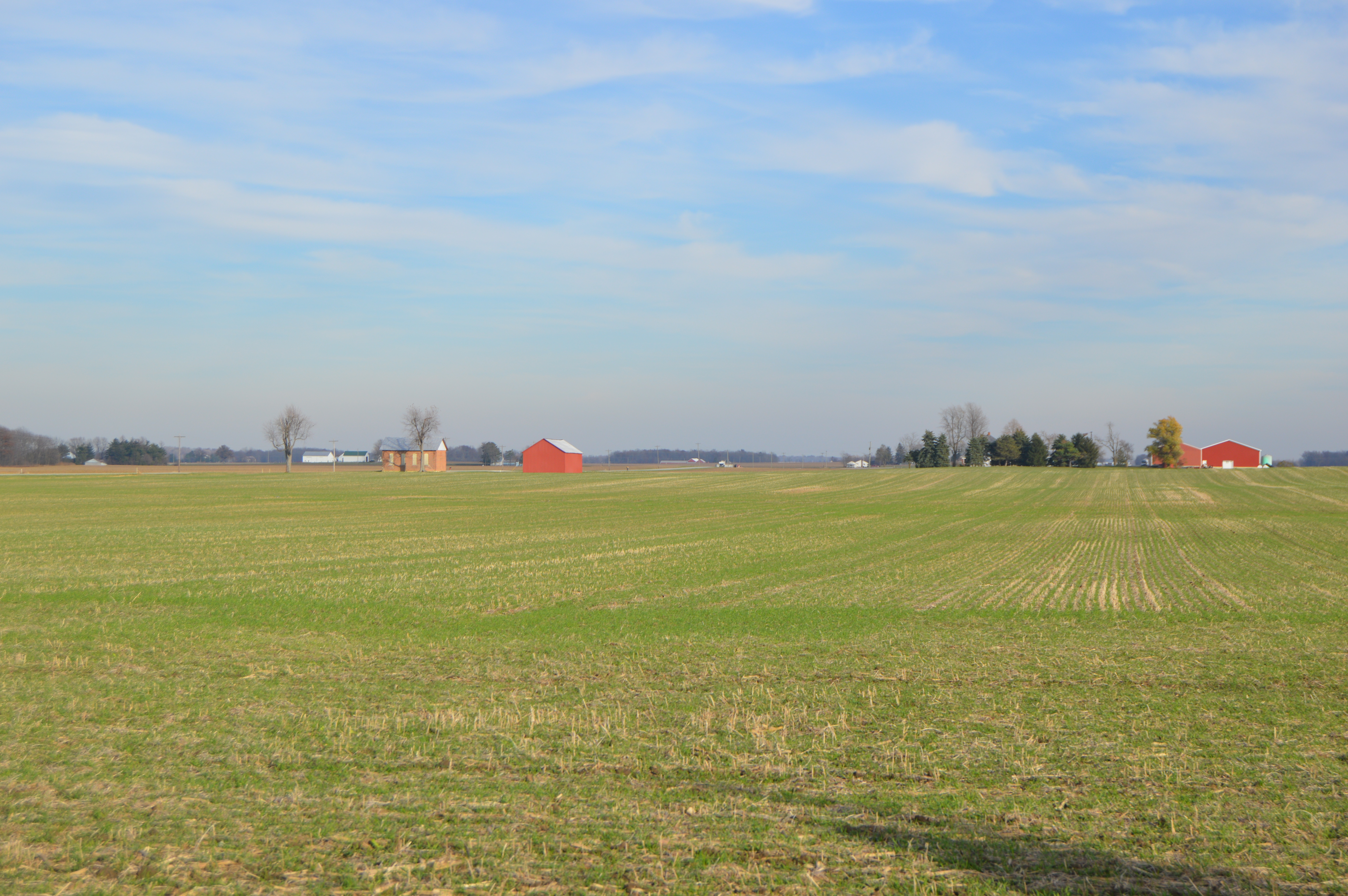
- Fields along Young Road, east of Union City

- Location in Darke County and the state of Ohio
- Coordinates: 40°12′16″N 84°46′59″W
- Country: United States
- State: Ohio
- County: Darke

Area
  - Total: 31.0 sq mi (80.4 km^{2})
  - Land: 31.0 sq mi (80.2 km^{2})
  - Water: 0.077 sq mi (0.2 km^{2})
- Elevation: 1,066 ft (325 m)

Population (2020)
  - Total: 2,668
  - Density: 86.2/sq mi (33.3/km^{2})
- Time zone: UTC-5 (Eastern (EST))
  - Summer (DST): UTC-4 (EDT)
- FIPS code: 39-37758
- GNIS feature ID: 1086016

Jackson Township is one of the twenty townships of Darke County, Ohio, United States. The 2020 census found 2,668 people in the township.

== Geography ==
Located in the northwestern part of the county, it borders the following townships:

- Mississinawa Township - north
- Allen Township - northeast
- Brown Township - east
- Greenville Township - southeast corner
- Washington Township - south
- Wayne Township, Randolph County, Indiana - southwest
- Jackson Township, Randolph County, Indiana - northwest

The village of Union City is located in western Jackson Township, along the Indiana border.

== Name and history ==
It is one of thirty-seven Jackson Townships statewide.

Jackson Township was split from Washington Township in 1833 but reduced by the creation of Gibson Township (now a part of Mercer County) in 1836. Ten families who arrived in the area in 1829 were the first settlers within the modern boundaries of the township.

== Government ==
The township is governed by a three-member board of trustees, who are elected in November of odd-numbered years to a four-year term beginning on the following January 1. Two are elected in the year after the presidential election and one is elected in the year before it. There is also an elected township fiscal officer, who serves a four-year term beginning on April 1 of the year after the election, which is held in November of the year before the presidential election. Vacancies in the fiscal officership or on the board of trustees are filled by the remaining trustees.
