= Wallischeck Homestead =

Historic house in Ohio, United States

- U.S. National Register of Historic Places
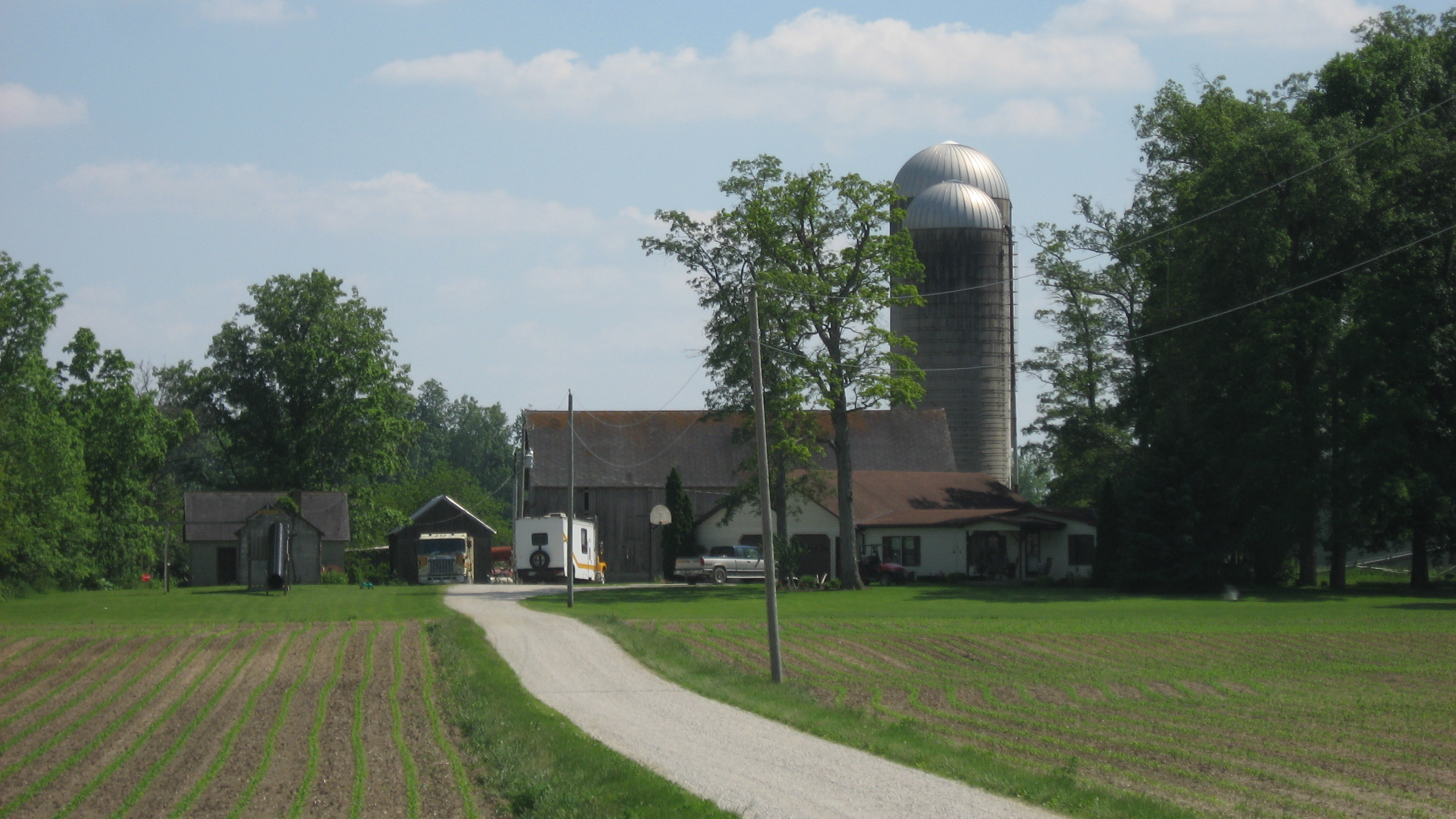
- Roadside view of the homestead

- Location within Ohio Location within the United States
- Location: Recovery Township, Mercer County
- Nearest city: Fort Recovery, Ohio
- Coordinates: 40°26′40″N 84°48′5″W
- Area: 18 acres (7.3 ha)
- Architect: Philo Wallischeck
- Architectural style: Vernacular German
- NRHP reference No.: 78002138
- Added to NRHP: November 27, 1978

The Wallischeck Homestead is a historic group of farm buildings in southwestern Mercer County, Ohio, United States. The family of Philo Wallischeck, all natives of the Grand Duchy of Baden, settled on the site in 1855. For their first ten years, they lived in a log cabin along the road; this arrangement ended when Philo bought a substantially larger area of land in 1866. Starting in that year and continuing until 1880, the family erected a complex of buildings that survive, virtually unchanged, into the present day.

Among the buildings in the farm complex are a brick butchering structure, a brick chicken coop, wooden sheds and rabbit hutches, a brick outhouse with a kitchen and watch house, a wooden grain barn, and the brick farmhouse. This house is a symmetrical one-and-one-half-story structure that features a single central recessed doorway with two windows on each side. Inside, the residents walk along walnut woodworking and are greeted by stencilling on the walls. Like the rest of the buildings on the homestead, the house has changed very little in the past century and a half, remaining in a condition almost identical to that of its youth.

In 1978, the Wallischeck Homestead was listed on the National Register of Historic Places. Key to its inclusion on the Register was its well-preserved historic architecture, which was seen as being a fine example of German vernacular architecture; additionally it also qualified for its place in Ohio's history.
