= Tiverton Center, Ohio =

Unincorporated community in Ohio, U.S.

Coordinates: 40°25′05″N 82°08′18″W

Tiverton Center is an unincorporated community in Coshocton County, in the U.S. state of Ohio.

== History ==
Tiverton Center was named for its location near the geographical center of Tiverton Township. It once contained a post office under the name Yankee Ridge. This post office was established in 1854, and remained in operation until 1894.
