= List of killings by law enforcement officers in the United States, July 2020 =

This is a list of people reported killed by non-military law enforcement officers in the United States in July 2020, whether in the line of duty or not, and regardless of reason or method. The listing documents the occurrence of a death, making no implications regarding wrongdoing or justification on the part of the person killed or officer involved. Killings are arranged by date of the incident that caused death. Different death dates, if known, are noted in the description. The table below lists 85 people.

== July 2020 ==
Date	Name (age) of deceased	Race	State (city)	Description
2020-07-31	Ronald Pope (49)	Unknown race	Morristown, TN	
2020-07-31	William Sears (30)	Unknown race	Brunswick, OH	
2020-07-30	Colin E. Davis (25)	Unknown race	Troy, NY	
2020-07-30	Darrien Walker (28)	Black	Detroit, MI	
2020-07-30	Gabriel Salinas (39)	Hispanic	Mission, TX	
2020-07-30	Gary Hardy Jr. (41)	Unknown race	Chino, CA	
2020-07-29	Giovanni Cedano-Amaro (21)	Unknown race	North Las Vegas, NV	
2020-07-29	Winston Joseph Latour III (37)	Unknown race	Lake Charles, LA	
2020-07-29	Juan Rene Hummel Jr. (25)	Unknown race	Bothell, WA	
2020-07-29	Jason Matthew Henke (42)	Unknown race	Golden Valley, AZ	
2020-07-28	Jacob Wilbur Wright (32)	Unknown race	Canton, NC	
2020-07-28	Howard Owens (47)	White	North Port, FL	
2020-07-28	Ray Adrian Lara (36)	Hispanic	El Paso, TX	
2020-07-27	Julio Cesar Virula (26)	Hispanic	Carmel, IN	
2020-07-26	Samuel Solomon Cochran Jr. (22)	Unknown race	Mount Airy, NC	
2020-07-25	Christopher Poor (49)	White	The Village, OK	
2020-07-25	Andrew Jacob Preece (35)	White	Salt Lake City, UT	
2020-07-24	Dane Norris (41)	Unknown race	Baytown, TX	
2020-07-24	Name Withheld	Unknown race	West End, FL	
2020-07-24	David Earl Brooks Jr. (45)	Black	Roxboro, NC	
2020-07-24	Chester Jenkins (60)	Black	Stockton, CA	
2020-07-24	Michael Allen Acord (28)	White	Narrows, VA	
2020-07-23	John Karl Sieger (51)	White	Eureka, CA	
2020-07-23	Name Withheld	Black	Detroit, MI	
2020-07-22	Scott M. Kontowicz (37)	White	Waukesha, WI	
2020-07-22	Deborah White (49)	Unknown race	Clearwater, FL	
2020-07-22	Kyle Elrod (30)	White	Oklahoma City, OK	
2020-07-21	Jeremy Southern (22)	Black	Sacramento, CA	
2020-07-20	David Angulo (33)	Hispanic	Chula Vista, CA	
2020-07-20	Vincent Harris (51)	African American	Louisiana (Baton Rouge)	While searching for Harris in the early morning, who was wanted on charges related to an attack involving Harris reportedly attacking his girlfriend with a machete, officers discovered Harris. He reportedly pointed a weapon at officers in an apartment, and officers opened fire, resulting in the death of Harris. A BRPD K-9 animal was injured.
2020-07-18	Darius Washington (24)	Black	Chicago Heights, IL	
2020-07-18	Grant King (35)	Unknown	Indiana (Indianapolis)	Officers were called to a residence where a man opened fire on them, causing an officer to return fire. The man went inside the home and IMPD SWAT members and Crisis Negotiation teams arrived. After multiple hours of a standoff, the man stopped communicating with officers and officers attempted to enter the home, and engaged in gunfire again with the man. Officers struck the man during this altercation and he died later at the hospital.
2020-07-17	Malcom Comeaux (24)	Unknown	Texas (Houston)	Two FBI agents serving a warrant on a child pornography investigation along with Houston Police, at a residence shot an armed man in the morning. While approaching the home, the agents reportedly saw a him walk outside the home brandishing a weapon, and refused to drop it when ordered to. The two agents opened fire, and he was pronounced dead at the scene.
2020-07-17	David Martin (28)	Unknown	Colorado (Fruita)	Officers responding to a call of a boyfriend threatening his girlfriend with a handgun, attempted to arrest the Martin. He did not cooperate and was ultimately shot by officers and pronounced dead at the scene.
2020-07-16	Name Withheld	White	North Fort Myers, FL	
2020-07-16	Aaron Anthony Hudson (31)	Black	Syracuse, NY	
2020-07-16	Aaron Olsvik (23)	Caucasian/White	Washington (King County)	A sixty-two year old man was walking his dog, and noticed someone following him, the man later identified as Olsvik then stabbed the man and the dog. Officers arrived at the scene and received reports of another attempted stabbing, and the Olsvik was located near an apartment complex. While officers attempted to arrest him he was shot and killed.
2020-07-16	Chase Roundtree (33)	Caucasian/White	Texas (Knox County)	Officers received calls about an active shooter on US 82, shooting at random vehicles in the morning. Officers arrived to find Roundtree had stolen a semi-truck at gunpoint and fled with a woman, and after a short pursuit he stopped the vehicle in the middle of the road. He exited the vehicle with a firearm and reportedly ignored officers shouted commands and pointed the firearm at officers. He was shot and wounded by officers, but later died at the hospital.
2020-07-15	Antwane Burrise (39)	Unknown race	Stockton, CA	
2020-07-14	Sean Ernest Ruis (43)	White	Grand Ledge, MI	
2020-07-14	Timothy O’Shea (24)	White	Morris Township, NJ	
2020-07-14	Cristhian Eliud Ramos-Murillo (32)	Hispanic	Knoxville, TN	
2020-07-14	Julio Jaramillo (28)	Hispanic	Deming, NM	
2020-07-14	Tyler Blevens (22)	Caucasian/White	Kentucky (Shepherdsville)	Following an hours-long standoff in which officers surrounded Blevens' home, he emerged from the house carrying a gun and attempted to get in a vehicle. Police say that officers shot him after giving repeated commands to drop the gun, to which he did not respond. Blevens was pronounced dead at the scene.
2020-07-14	Vincent Demario Truitt (17)	Unknown	Georgia (Cobb County)	Officers reported that they identified a stolen vehicle while it was being driven by Demario Truitt and two other teenagers, and attempted a traffic stop which resulted in a car chase. After running into a dead end, the other teenagers attempted to flee the car and were arrested by officers. When the teenagers left the vehicle, Demario Truitt reportedly pointed a handgun at officers, and was shot by one officer. The other two teenagers were arrested on an outstanding warrant and in relation to the stolen vehicle.
2020-07-13	Arlan Kaleb Schultz (31)	Unknown race	Mendota Heights, MN	
2020-07-13	Glynn Farse Young (59)	Caucasian/White	Tennessee (Rockwood)	Officers responded to a domestic disturbance call on the highway between a man and woman, the woman left the vehicle and the man drove away from the scene resulting in a chase. Once stopped by the officers, the man exited the vehicle and brandished a handgun at the officers, causing one of the officers to fire and kill Farse Young.
2020-07-12	Marcos Reyes (28)	Hispanic	Chamblee, GA	
2020-07-12	Rodney Morrison (47)	Unknown	Georgia (Leesburg)	In the afternoon, officers responded to Morrison's home in order to serve court-mandated paperwork to him. Per the officers statement Morrison threatened the officers with a knife as they tried to serve the paperwork and then fled the area into a field. During his attempt to flee from the area one of the officers opened fire, and struck Morrison who later died at a local hospital.
2020-07-12	Terena Thurman (36)	Caucasian/White	Ohio (Butler Township)	Officers were searching for Thurman who had a warrant for her arrest from a prior offense. When she was found, she fled and reportedly stole a truck and when officers tried to make an arrest she reportedly hit an officer with the truck. It is believed by officers that the officer who was hit by the truck, fired his weapon in defense of the other officers. Thurman was struck in the chest and crashed the truck she was driving, and pronounced dead at a local hospital.
2020-07-11	Michael Culbertson (26)	Caucasian/White	South Carolina (Greenville County)	According to the Greenville County Coroner, officers were attempting to serve a warrant on Culbertson when he pulled out a weapon and pointed it at the officers. One of the officers shot Culbertson, and he was pronounced dead at a local hospital.
2020-07-11	Antonio Mancinone (23)	Hispanic	Monument, CO	
2020-07-10	Hakim Littleton (20)	Black	Detroit, MI	
2020-07-10	Daniel Matheson (29)	Unknown race	Reston, VA	
2020-07-10	Kanavis Dujan Glass (31)	Unknown	Florida (Panama City Beach)	Officers responding to an early morning, domestic violence incident arrived at the home to Glass shooting his girlfriend in her face. Glass was killed when officers returned fire, and the girlfriend was taken to a local hospital.
2020-07-10	Kevin Michael Norton (60)	Caucasian/White	Pennsylvania (Forksville)	Norton was killed by police officers attempting to serve a warrant for his arrest.
2020-07-09	Name Withheld	Hispanic	Calexico, CA	
2020-07-09	Richard Lewis Price (49)	Black	San Diego, CA	
2020-07-09	Eduardo Martinez (44)	Hispanic	Brentwood, CA	
2020-07-08	Erroll Johnson (31)	Black	Monroe, LA	
2020-07-08	Malik Canty (36)	Black	Paterson, NJ	
2020-07-08	Adam Lucas Carroll (37)	White	Pascagoula, MS	
2020-07-08	Ashley Marie Wells (23)	Black	Torrance, CA	
2020-07-07	Carlos Baires (36)	Hispanic	Fresno, CA	
2020-07-07	Paul Williams	Black	Houston, TX	
2020-07-07	Paul Eugene Armstrong (62)	White	Etowah, TN	
2020-07-06	Joseph Ahr Sr. (64)	White	New Jersey (Trenton)	An officer pepper sprayed Ahr, who had one lung, at close range while responding to a call from Ahr's son about an altercation with his child's mother. Ahr died in a hospital 18 days later, and his death was ruled a homicide. In 2023 the officer who pepper-sprayed Ahr was indicted for official misconduct in relation to Ahr's death.
2020-07-06	William Wade Burgess III (27)	Black	St. Louis, MO	
2020-07-06	Joey Hoffman (40)	Unknown race	Smithfield Township, PA	
2020-07-06	Joseph W. Denton (35)	Black	Milwaukee, WI	
2020-07-06	Erick Gilmore (40)	White	Cornwall, NY	
2020-07-05	Tylor Warner (30)	White	Indiana (Muncie)	Warner was shot and killed by police while armed with a BB Gun. He was reportedly suicidal with intention to die suicide by cop.
2020-07-05	Hakim Littleton (20)	African American	Michigan (Detroit)	In the morning hours of July 5, police officers responded to a shooting at a Fourth of July party, and were in the process of detaining an individual. Littleton, who was initially walking away from the area, saw that the man being detained was his friend and approached the officers, pulled out a firearm and shot at one of the officers. An officer tackled him as more shots were fired, and officers responded by shooting Littleton. The incident sparked protests in Detroit which lasted several days, with many protesters disputing the officer's accounts and the body camera footage. 8 individuals were arrested at these protests.
2020-07-05	Matthew Blake Dixon	White	Chino, CA	
2020-07-04	James Porter Garcia (28)	Caucasian/White or Hispanic/Latino	Arizona (Phoenix)	Officers surrounding Garcia's parked car fired at least 10 shots at him as he sat in the vehicle. Whether Garcia was armed is disputed. The Phoenix Police Department said that two officers who fired at Garcia had their body-worn cameras recording during the incident.
2020-07-04	Rogelio Castro	Hispanic	Irving, TX	
2020-07-04	Axel Perez (17)	Hispanic	Jacksonville, FL	
2020-07-04	Rodney Liveringhouse (70)	White	Phoenix, AZ	
2020-07-03	Doug Diamond (58)	Unknown race	Welches, OR	
2020-07-02	Ky Johnson (31)	Black	Kansas City, MO	
2020-07-02	Kevan Ruffin Jr. (32)	African American	Wisconsin (Sheboygan)	Ruffin Jr. was wielding 2 sai as he charged the officer. The officer shot 7 times, 4 of them hitting Ruffin Jr. in the chest who died minutes later at the scene.
2020-07-02	Name Withheld	Unknown race	Kansas City, MO	
2020-07-01	Constantin Filan	White	Houston, TX	
2020-07-01	Jason Noble Snow (34)	White	Durango, CO	
2020-07-01	Wade Protus Phillips (49)	White	Myrtle Beach, SC	

== See also ==
- Death in custody § United States
- Henry A. Wallace Police Crime Public Database
- List of cases of police brutality
- List of countries with annual rates and counts for killings by law enforcement officers
- List of law enforcement officers killed in the line of duty in the United States
- List of law enforcement officers convicted for an on-duty killing in the United States
- List of shootings by US immigration agents
- List of police reforms related to the George Floyd protests
- List of unarmed African Americans killed by law enforcement officers in the United States
- Lists of killings by law enforcement officers
- Police brutality in the United States
- Police misconduct § United States
- Police riot § United States
- Police use of deadly force in the United States
