= Washington Township, Darke County, Ohio =

Township in Ohio, US

- Township
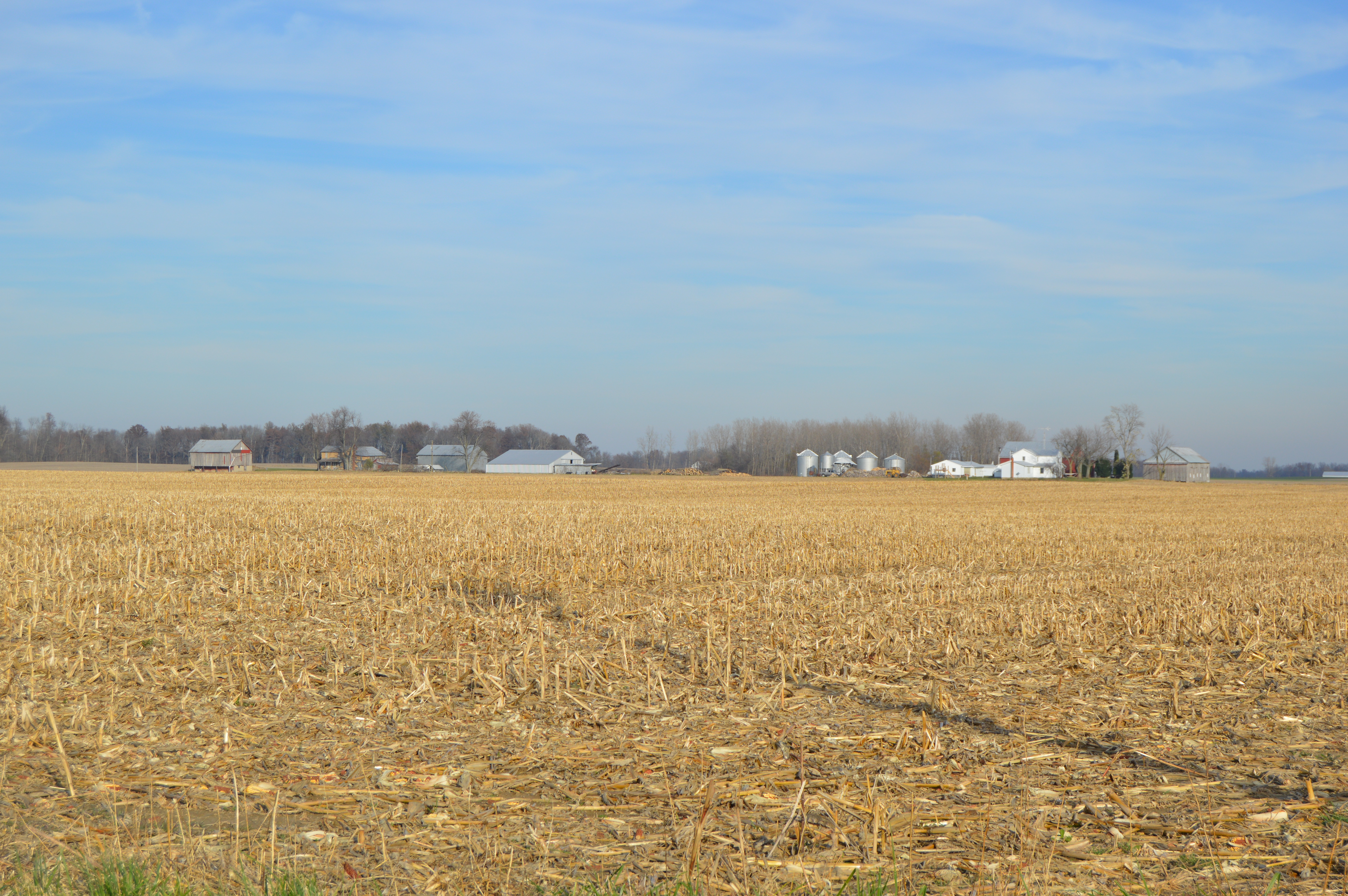
- Fields north of Sharps Crossing

- Location in Darke County and the state of Ohio
- Coordinates: 40°8′34″N 84°45′39″W
- Country: United States
- State: Ohio
- County: Darke

Area
  - Total: 31.7 sq mi (82.0 km^{2})
  - Land: 31.6 sq mi (81.8 km^{2})
  - Water: 0.077 sq mi (0.2 km^{2})
- Elevation: 1,076 ft (328 m)

Population (2020)
  - Total: 1,286
  - Density: 40.7/sq mi (15.7/km^{2})
- Time zone: UTC-5 (Eastern (EST))
  - Summer (DST): UTC-4 (EDT)
- FIPS code: 39-81186
- GNIS feature ID: 1086026

Washington Township is one of the twenty townships of Darke County, Ohio, United States. The 2020 census found 1,286 people in the township.

== Geography ==
Located in the western part of the county, it borders the following townships:

- Jackson Township - north
- Brown Township - northeast corner
- Greenville Township - east
- Liberty Township - south
- Greensfork Township, Randolph County, Indiana - southwest
- Wayne Township, Randolph County, Indiana - northwest

No municipalities are located in Washington Township.

== Name and history ==
Washington Township was established in 1819. It is one of forty-three Washington Townships statewide.

== Government ==
The township is governed by a three-member board of trustees, who are elected in November of odd-numbered years to a four-year term beginning on the following January 1. Two are elected in the year after the presidential election and one is elected in the year before it. There is also an elected township fiscal officer, who serves a four-year term beginning on April 1 of the year after the election, which is held in November of the year before the presidential election. Vacancies in the fiscal officership or on the board of trustees are filled by the remaining trustees.
