= York Township, Darke County, Ohio =

Township in Ohio, US

- Township
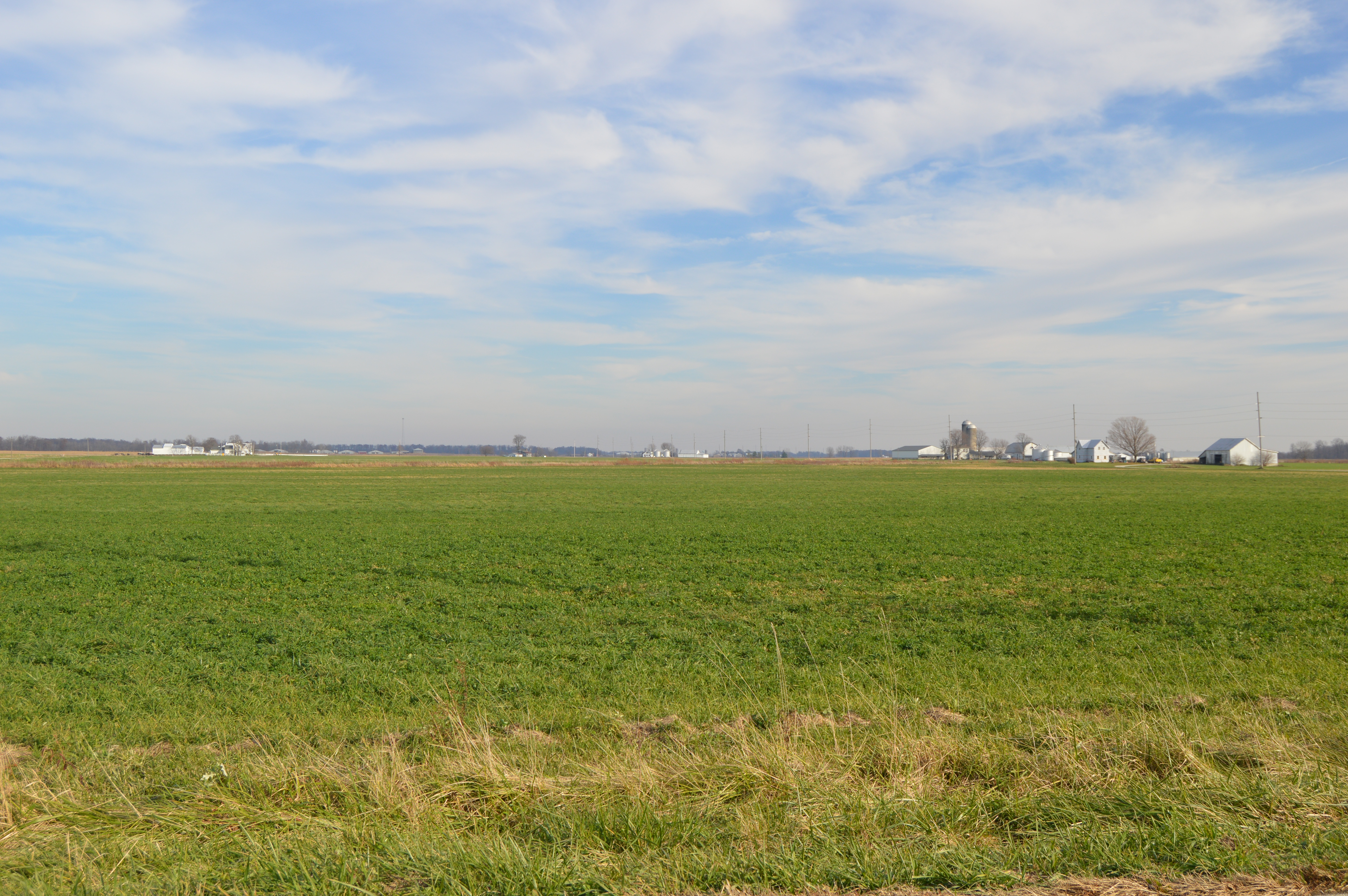
- Fields in the township's far west

- Location in Darke County and the state of Ohio.
- Coordinates: 40°15′43″N 84°33′56″W
- Country: United States
- State: Ohio
- County: Darke

Area
  - Total: 21.7 sq mi (56.3 km^{2})
  - Land: 21.7 sq mi (56.2 km^{2})
  - Water: 0.039 sq mi (0.1 km^{2})
- Elevation: 1,060 ft (323 m)

Population (2020)
  - Total: 564
  - Density: 26.0/sq mi (10.0/km^{2})
- Time zone: UTC-5 (Eastern (EST))
  - Summer (DST): UTC-4 (EDT)
- FIPS code: 39-87010
- GNIS feature ID: 1086028

York Township is one of the twenty townships of Darke County, Ohio, United States. The 2020 census found 564 people in the township.

== Geography ==
Located in the northern part of the county, it borders the following townships:

- Wabash Township - north
- Patterson Township - northeast
- Wayne Township - southeast
- Richland Township - south
- Brown Township - southwest
- Allen Township - northwest

No municipalities are located in York Township.

== Name and history ==
One of ten York Townships statewide, it is named after a farmer, Newberry York, who lived on Indian Creek in the township, and who was the first local Justice of the Peace. Born near Wrightsboro, Georgia on September 6, 1784, York served in the War of 1812 before moving to Darke County. He and his family first settled in Wayne Township before moving to what became York Township.

York Township was established in 1837 from land given by Richland Township.

== Government ==
The township is governed by a three-member board of trustees, who are elected in November of odd-numbered years to a four-year term beginning on the following January 1. Two are elected in the year after the presidential election and one is elected in the year before it. There is also an elected township fiscal officer, who serves a four-year term beginning on April 1 of the year after the election, which is held in November of the year before the presidential election. Vacancies in the fiscal officership or on the board of trustees are filled by the remaining trustees.
