= Butler Township, Mercer County, Ohio =

Township in Ohio, US

- Township
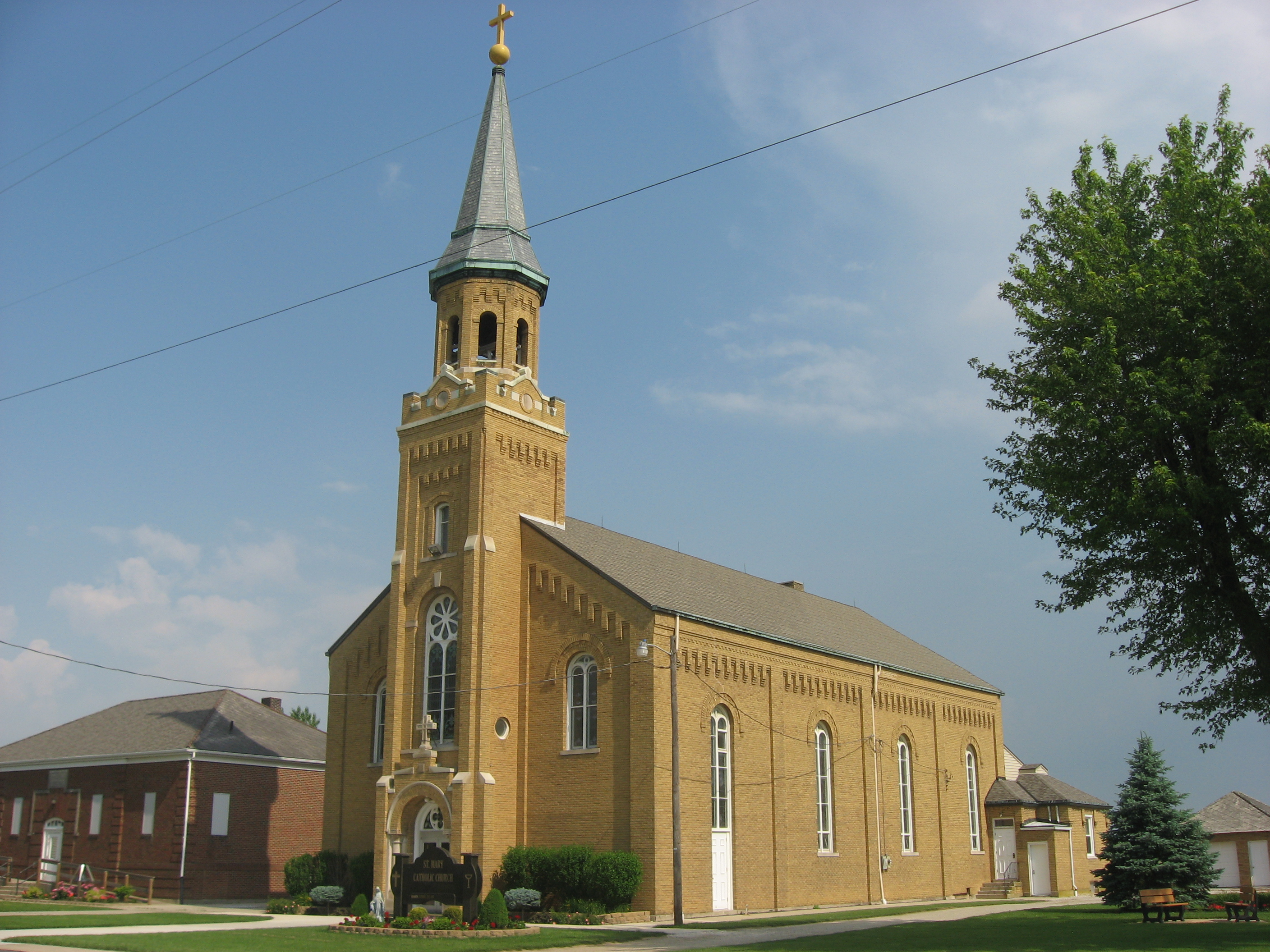
- St. Mary's Catholic Church at Philothea

- Location in Mercer County and the state of Ohio.
- Coordinates: 40°28′59″N 84°37′39″W
- Country: United States
- State: Ohio
- County: Mercer

Area
  - Total: 33.2 sq mi (86.0 km^{2})
  - Land: 33.1 sq mi (85.8 km^{2})
  - Water: 0.12 sq mi (0.3 km^{2})
- Elevation: 892 ft (272 m)

Population (2020)
  - Total: 6,653
  - Density: 201/sq mi (77.5/km^{2})
- Time zone: UTC-5 (Eastern (EST))
  - Summer (DST): UTC-4 (EDT)
- FIPS code: 39-10604
- GNIS feature ID: 1086621

Butler Township is one of the fourteen townships of Mercer County, Ohio, United States. The 2020 census found 6,653 people in the township.

== Geography ==
Located in the south central part of the county, it borders the following townships:

- Jefferson Township – north
- Franklin Township – east
- Marion Township – southeast
- Granville Township – south
- Recovery Township – southwest
- Washington Township – northwest

The village of Coldwater is located in central Butler Township.

== Name and history ==
Butler Township was organized in 1838. It is one of six Butler Townships statewide.

== Government ==
The township is governed by a three-member board of trustees, who are elected in November of odd-numbered years to a four-year term beginning on the following January 1. Two are elected in the year after the presidential election and one is elected in the year before it. There is also an elected township fiscal officer, who serves a four-year term beginning on April 1 of the year after the election, which is held in November of the year before the presidential election. Vacancies in the fiscal officership or on the board of trustees are filled by the remaining trustees.
