= Wabash Township, Darke County, Ohio =

Township in Darke County, Ohio, US

- Township
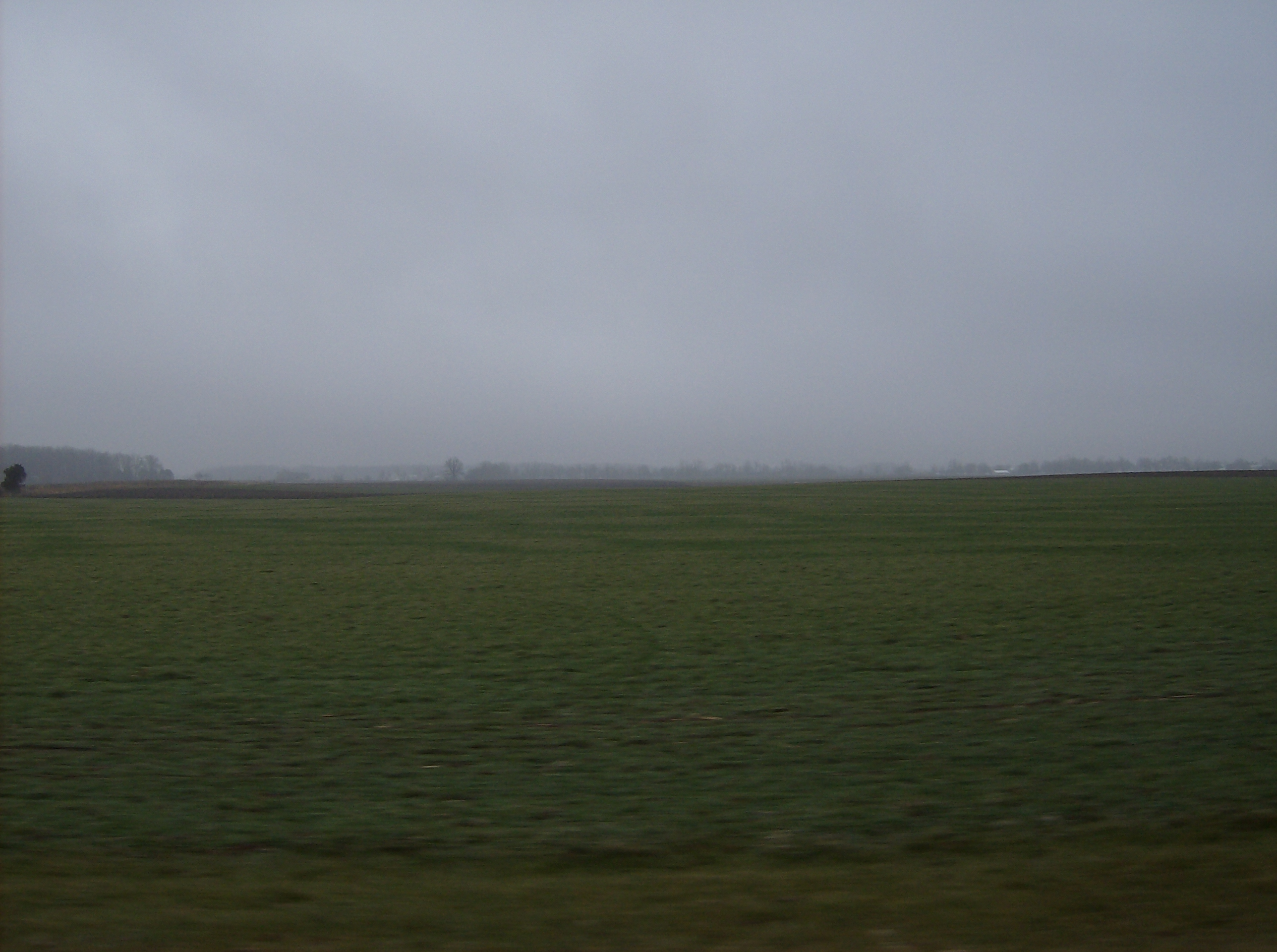
- Winter wheat field in Wabash Township

- Location in Darke County and the state of Ohio
- Coordinates: 40°19′38″N 84°33′59″W
- Country: United States
- State: Ohio
- County: Darke
- Named for: Wabash River

Area
  - Total: 21.8 sq mi (56.5 km^{2})
  - Land: 21.8 sq mi (56.5 km^{2})
  - Water: 0 sq mi (0.0 km^{2})
- Elevation: 1,004 ft (306 m)

Population (2020)
  - Total: 909
  - Density: 41.7/sq mi (16.1/km^{2})
- Time zone: UTC-5 (Eastern (EST))
  - Summer (DST): UTC-4 (EDT)
- FIPS code: 39-80248
- GNIS feature ID: 1086025

Wabash Township is one of the twenty townships of Darke County, Ohio, United States. The 2020 census found 909 people in the township.

== Geography ==
Located in the northern part of the county, it borders the following townships:

- Marion Township, Mercer County—northeast
- Patterson Township—east
- York Township—south
- Allen Township—west
- Granville Township, Mercer County—northwest

The village of North Star is located in central Wabash Township.

== Name and history ==
Wabash Township was established in 1841, and most likely was named after the Wabash River. It is the only Wabash Township statewide.

== Government ==
The township is governed by a three-member board of trustees, who are elected in November of odd-numbered years to a four-year term beginning on the following January 1. Two are elected in the year after the presidential election and one is elected in the year before it. There is also an elected township fiscal officer, who serves a four-year term beginning on April 1 of the year after the election, which is held in November of the year before the presidential election. Vacancies in the fiscal officership or on the board of trustees are filled by the remaining trustees.
