= New Weston, Ohio =

- Village
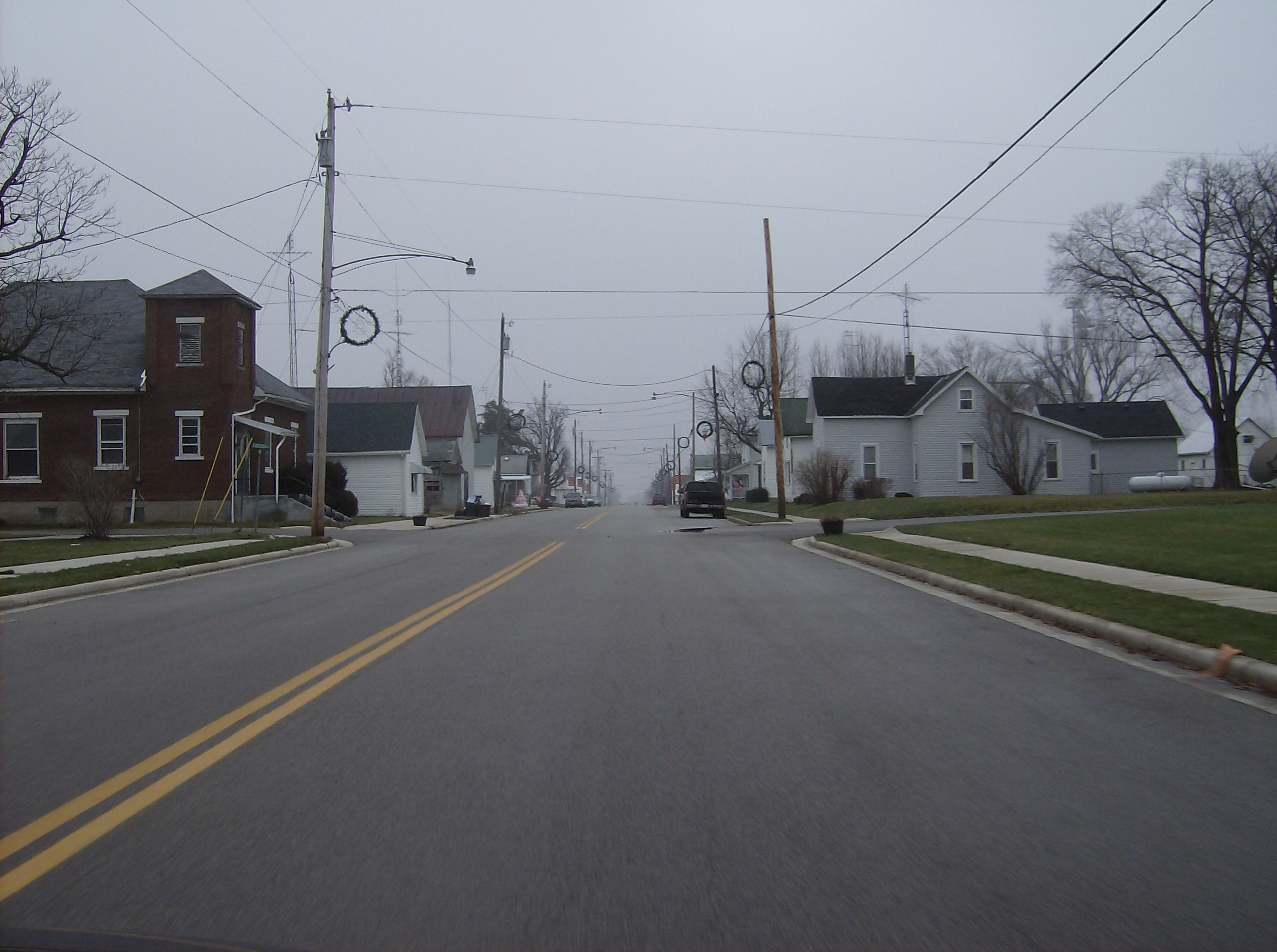
- Main Street in western New Weston

- Location in Darke County and the state of Ohio.
- Coordinates: 40°20′13″N 84°38′37″W
- Country: United States
- State: Ohio
- County: Darke
- Township: Allen

Area
  - Total: 0.25 sq mi (0.66 km^{2})
  - Land: 0.25 sq mi (0.66 km^{2})
  - Water: 0 sq mi (0.00 km^{2})
- Elevation: 1,011 ft (308 m)

Population (2020)
  - Total: 124
  - Density: 485/sq mi (187.2/km^{2})
- Time zone: UTC-5 (Eastern (EST))
  - Summer (DST): UTC-4 (EDT)
- ZIP code: 45348
- Area code: 419
- FIPS code: 39-55818
- GNIS feature ID: 2399487

New Weston is a village in Darke County, Ohio, United States. The population was 124 at the 2020 census.

== History ==
New Weston was founded in the 1880s during the construction of a railroad line through Allen Township by a predecessor of the Cincinnati, Jackson and Mackinaw Railroad. It was one of the last communities to be founded in Darke County.

== Geography ==
According to the United States Census Bureau, the village has a total area of 0.26 square miles (0.67 km^{2}), all land.

== Demographics ==
Historical population
Census	Pop.	Note	%±
1910	258		—
1920	232		−10.1%
1930	174		−25.0%
1940	169		−2.9%
1950	136		−19.5%
1960	146		7.4%
1970	174		19.2%
1980	184		5.7%
1990	148		−19.6%
2000	135		−8.8%
2010	136		0.7%
2020	124		−8.8%
U.S. Decennial Census

=== 2010 census ===
As of the census of 2010, there were 136 people, 45 households, and 33 families living in the village. The population density was 523.1 inhabitants per square mile (202.0/km^{2}). There were 57 housing units at an average density of 219.2 per square mile (84.6/km^{2}). The racial makeup of the village was 97.8% White, 1.5% African American, and 0.7% from two or more races. Hispanic or Latino of any race were 5.1% of the population.

There were 45 households, of which 48.9% had children under the age of 18 living with them, 51.1% were married couples living together, 17.8% had a female householder with no husband present, 4.4% had a male householder with no wife present, and 26.7% were non-families. 20.0% of all households were made up of individuals, and 2.2% had someone living alone who was 65 years of age or older. The average household size was 3.02 and the average family size was 3.58.

The median age in the village was 28 years. 38.2% of residents were under the age of 18; 5.2% were between the ages of 18 and 24; 31.6% were from 25 to 44; 17.6% were from 45 to 64; and 7.4% were 65 years of age or older. The gender makeup of the village was 51.5% male and 48.5% female.

=== 2000 census ===
As of the census of 2000, there were 135 people, 48 households, and 33 families living in the village. The population density was 528.0 inhabitants per square mile (203.9/km^{2}). There were 52 housing units at an average density of 203.4 per square mile (78.5/km^{2}). The racial makeup of the village was 97.78% White, and 2.22% from two or more races.

There were 48 households, out of which 35.4% had children under the age of 18 living with them, 56.3% were married couples living together, 6.3% had a female householder with no husband present, and 31.3% were non-families. 29.2% of all households were made up of individuals, and 8.3% had someone living alone who was 65 years of age or older. The average household size was 2.81 and the average family size was 3.27.

In the village, the population was spread out, with 31.9% under the age of 18, 9.6% from 18 to 24, 28.9% from 25 to 44, 20.0% from 45 to 64, and 9.6% who were 65 years of age or older. The median age was 30 years. For every 100 females, there were 107.7 males. For every 100 females age 18 and over, there were 109.1 males.

The median income for a household in the village was $38,333, and the median income for a family was $39,375. Males had a median income of $30,313 versus $19,375 for females. The per capita income for the village was $13,270. There were 8.1% of families and 12.6% of the population living below the poverty line, including 16.7% of under eighteens and none of those over 64.
