= Allen Township, Darke County, Ohio =

Township in Ohio, US

- Township
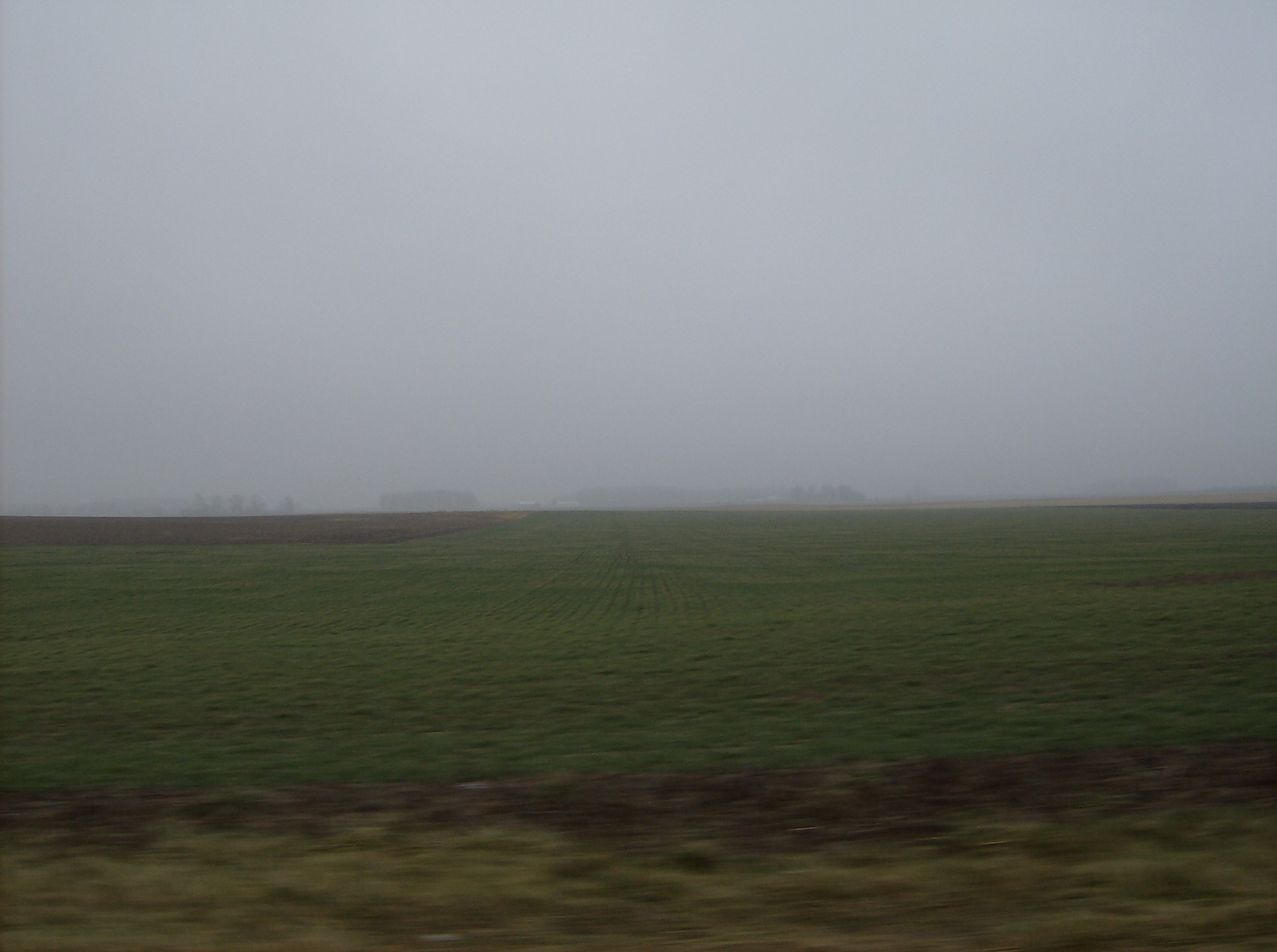
- Much of Allen Township is wide, flat farmland

- Location in Darke County and the state of Ohio.
- Coordinates: 40°18′53″N 84°39′46″W
- Country: United States
- State: Ohio
- County: Darke

Area
  - Total: 28.9 sq mi (74.9 km^{2})
  - Land: 28.8 sq mi (74.5 km^{2})
  - Water: 0.15 sq mi (0.4 km^{2})
- Elevation: 1,043 ft (318 m)

Population (2020)
  - Total: 1,008
  - Density: 35.0/sq mi (13.5/km^{2})
- Time zone: UTC-5 (Eastern (EST))
  - Summer (DST): UTC-4 (EDT)
- FIPS code: 39-01294
- GNIS feature ID: 1086010

Allen Township is one of the twenty townships of Darke County, Ohio, United States. The 2020 census found 1,008 people in the township.

== Geography ==
Located in the northern part of the county, it borders the following townships:

- Granville Township, Mercer County - north
- Wabash Township - northeast
- York Township - southeast
- Brown Township - south
- Jackson Township - southwest
- Mississinawa Township - west
- Gibson Township, Mercer County - northwest

Three incorporated villages are located in Allen Township:

- Part of Burkettsville in the far north
- New Weston in the north
- Rossburg in the southeast

== Name and history ==
Statewide, the only other Allen Townships are located in Hancock, Ottawa, and Union Counties.

The first settlers within the bounds of today's Allen Township were the families of Ephraim and Aaron Ireland. The township was organized in March 1839 as a split from Brown Township. It was greatly reduced when the Mercer County line was extended to the south; approximately half of the township was split off to form that county's Granville Township. The first school in the township was built in 1840, and the first church was an Evangelical congregation. The first railroad in the township was a predecessor of the Cincinnati, Jackson and Mackinaw Railroad, which built a line through Rossburg and New Weston in 1883.

== Government ==
The township is governed by a three-member board of trustees, who are elected in November of odd-numbered years to a four-year term beginning on the following January 1. Two are elected in the year after the presidential election and one is elected in the year before it. There is also an elected township fiscal officer, who serves a four-year term beginning on April 1 of the year after the election, which is held in November of the year before the presidential election. Vacancies in the fiscal officership or on the board of trustees are filled by the remaining trustees.
