= Butler Township, Ohio =

Butler Township, Ohio, may refer to:

- Butler Township, Columbiana County, Ohio
- Butler Township, Darke County, Ohio
- Butler Township, Knox County, Ohio
- Butler Township, Mercer County, Ohio
- Butler Township, Montgomery County, Ohio
- Butler Township, Richland County, Ohio
