= Brown Township, Darke County, Ohio =

Township in Ohio, US

- Township
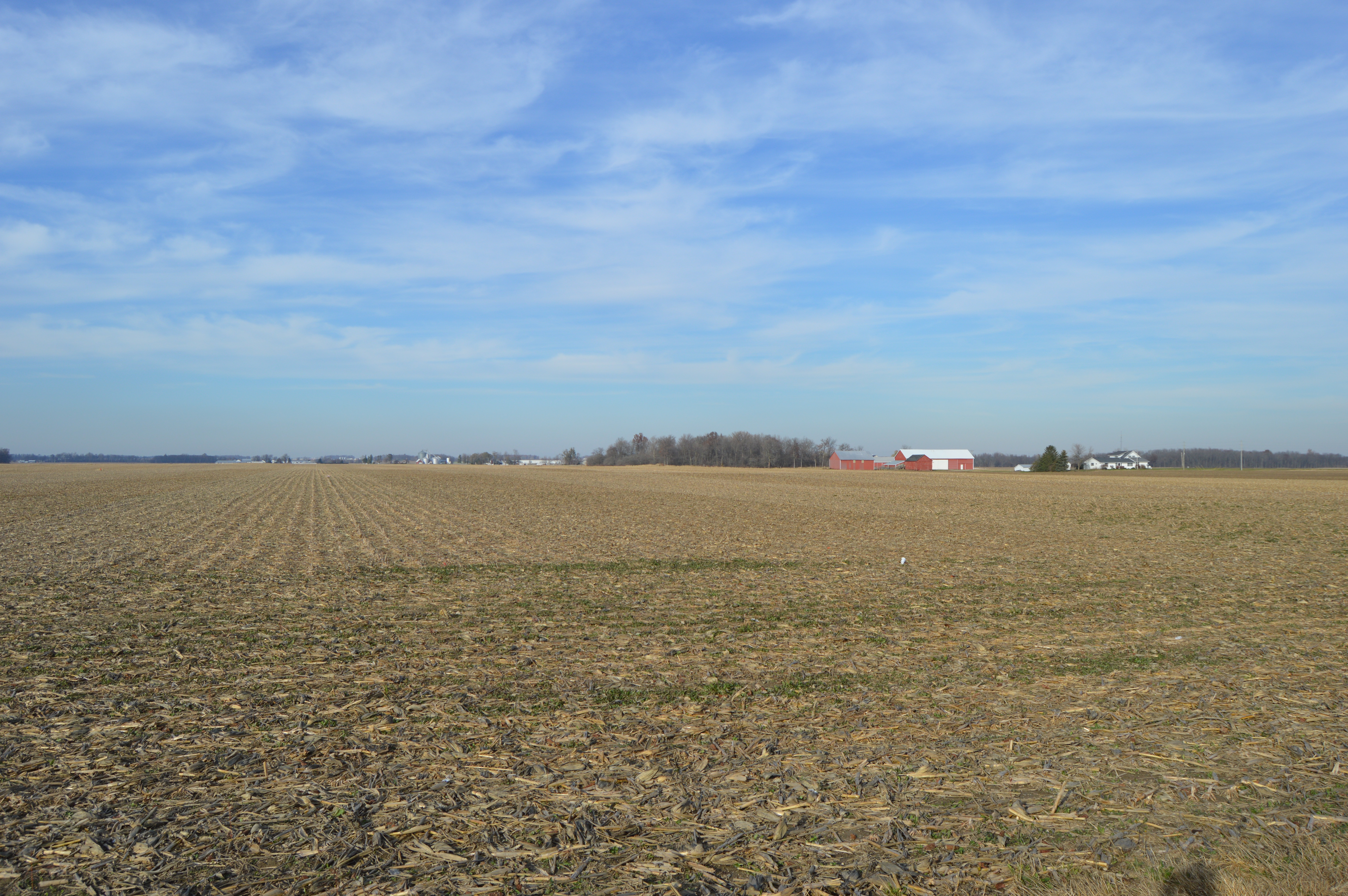
- Along State Route 47 west of Ansonia

- Location in Darke County and the state of Ohio
- Coordinates: 40°13′13″N 84°38′58″W
- Country: United States
- State: Ohio
- County: Darke

Area
  - Total: 29.7 sq mi (76.8 km^{2})
  - Land: 29.6 sq mi (76.7 km^{2})
  - Water: 0.039 sq mi (0.1 km^{2})
- Elevation: 1,004 ft (306 m)

Population (2020)
  - Total: 2,056
  - Density: 69.4/sq mi (26.8/km^{2})
- Time zone: UTC-5 (Eastern (EST))
  - Summer (DST): UTC-4 (EDT)
- FIPS code: 39-09414
- GNIS feature ID: 1086011

Brown Township is one of the twenty townships of Darke County, Ohio, United States. The 2020 census found 2,056 people in the township.

== Geography ==
Located in the northern part of the county, it borders the following townships:

- Allen Township - north
- York Township - northeast
- Richland Township - southeast
- Greenville Township - south
- Washington Township - southwest corner
- Jackson Township - west

The village of Ansonia is located in eastern Brown Township.

== Name and history ==
It is one of eight Brown Townships statewide.

One of the flattest townships in Darke County, it was very swampy; the land was only drained in the 1870s, well after the completion of a similar process in the county's other townships. Despite the wetness of the terrain, the first settler in the township, John Woodington, arrived prior to 1817, and the township's first church (a Church of Christ) and school were established in 1827. The township was founded in December 1833; up to this point, it had been a part of Washington Township.

== Government ==
The township is governed by a three-member board of trustees, who are elected in November of odd-numbered years to a four-year term beginning on the following January 1. Two are elected in the year after the presidential election and one is elected in the year before it. There is also an elected township fiscal officer, who serves a four-year term beginning on April 1 of the year after the election, which is held in November of the year before the presidential election. Vacancies in the fiscal officership or on the board of trustees are filled by the remaining trustees.
