= Greenville Township, Darke County, Ohio =

Township in Ohio, US

- Township
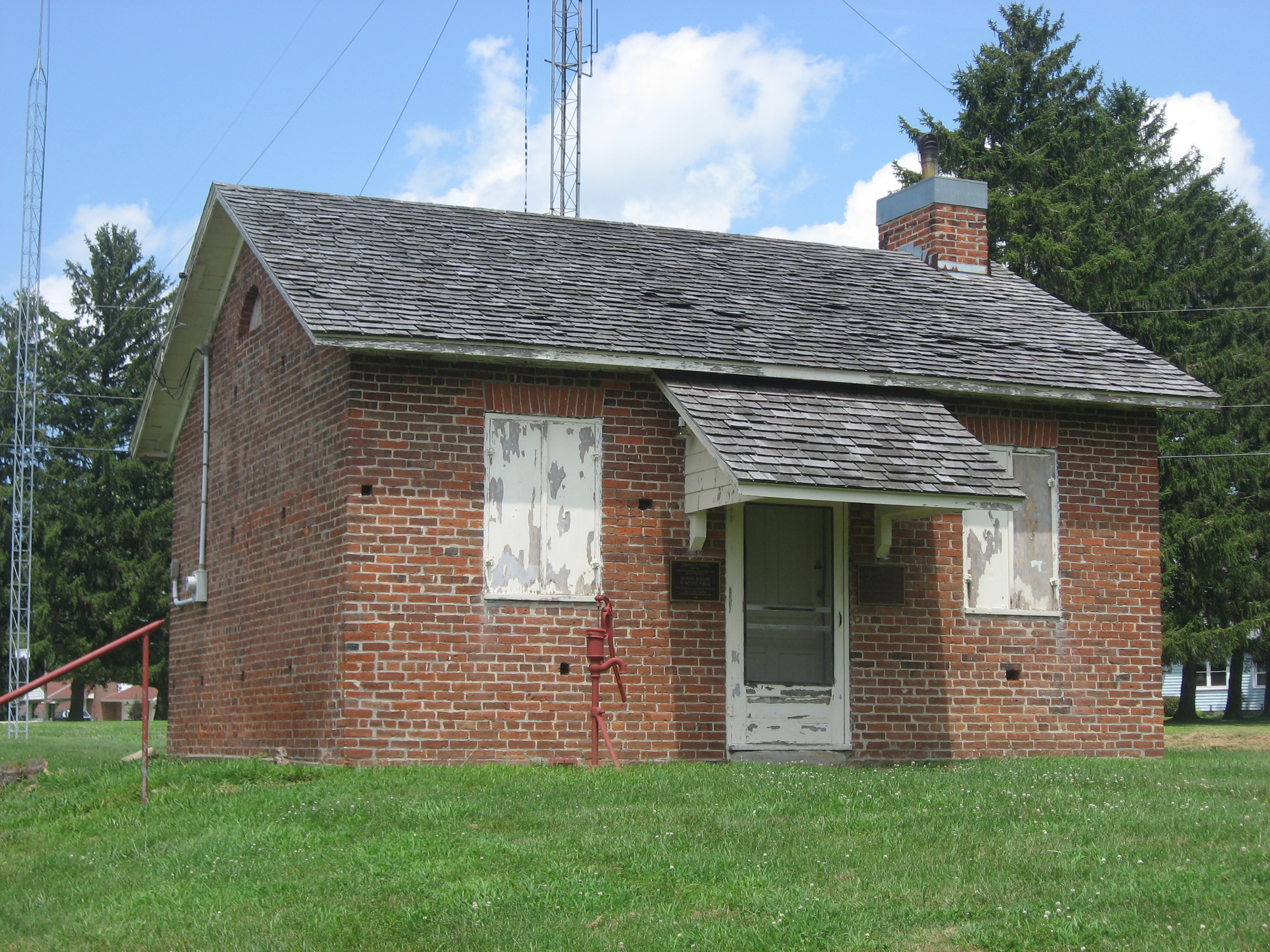
- The Beehive School, a historic site in the township

- Location in Darke County and the state of Ohio.
- Coordinates: 40°6′27″N 84°37′44″W
- Country: United States
- State: Ohio
- County: Darke

Area
  - Total: 57.5 sq mi (148.9 km^{2})
  - Land: 57.3 sq mi (148.4 km^{2})
  - Water: 0.19 sq mi (0.5 km^{2})
- Elevation: 1,033 ft (315 m)

Population (2020)
  - Total: 17,159
  - Density: 299.5/sq mi (115.6/km^{2})
- Time zone: UTC-5 (Eastern (EST))
  - Summer (DST): UTC-4 (EDT)
- ZIP code: 45331
- Area codes: 937, 326
- FIPS code: 39-32354
- GNIS feature ID: 1086014
- Website: townshipofgreenville.org

Greenville Township is one of the twenty townships of Darke County, Ohio, United States. The 2020 census found 17,159 people in the township, 4,373 of whom lived in the unincorporated parts of the township.

== Geography ==
Located in the center of the county, it borders the following townships:

- Brown Township - north
- Richland Township - northeast
- Adams Township - east
- Van Buren Township - southeast
- Neave Township - south
- Liberty Township - southwest
- Washington Township - west
- Jackson Township - northwest corner

The city of Greenville, the county seat of Darke County, is located in central Greenville Township. The unincorporated community of Woodington is on the border between Greenville and Brown townships, and is named after its first settler, John Woodington.

== Name and history ==
Greenville Township was the original township of Darke County, and at first contained all of its territory. It is the only Greenville Township statewide.

== Government ==
The township is governed by a three-member board of trustees, who are elected in November of odd-numbered years to a four-year term beginning on the following January 1. Two are elected in the year after the presidential election and one is elected in the year before it. There is also an elected township fiscal officer, who serves a four-year term beginning on April 1 of the year after the election, which is held in November of the year before the presidential election. Vacancies in the fiscal officership or on the board of trustees are filled by the remaining trustees.
