= Mississinawa Township, Darke County, Ohio =

Township in Ohio, US

- Township
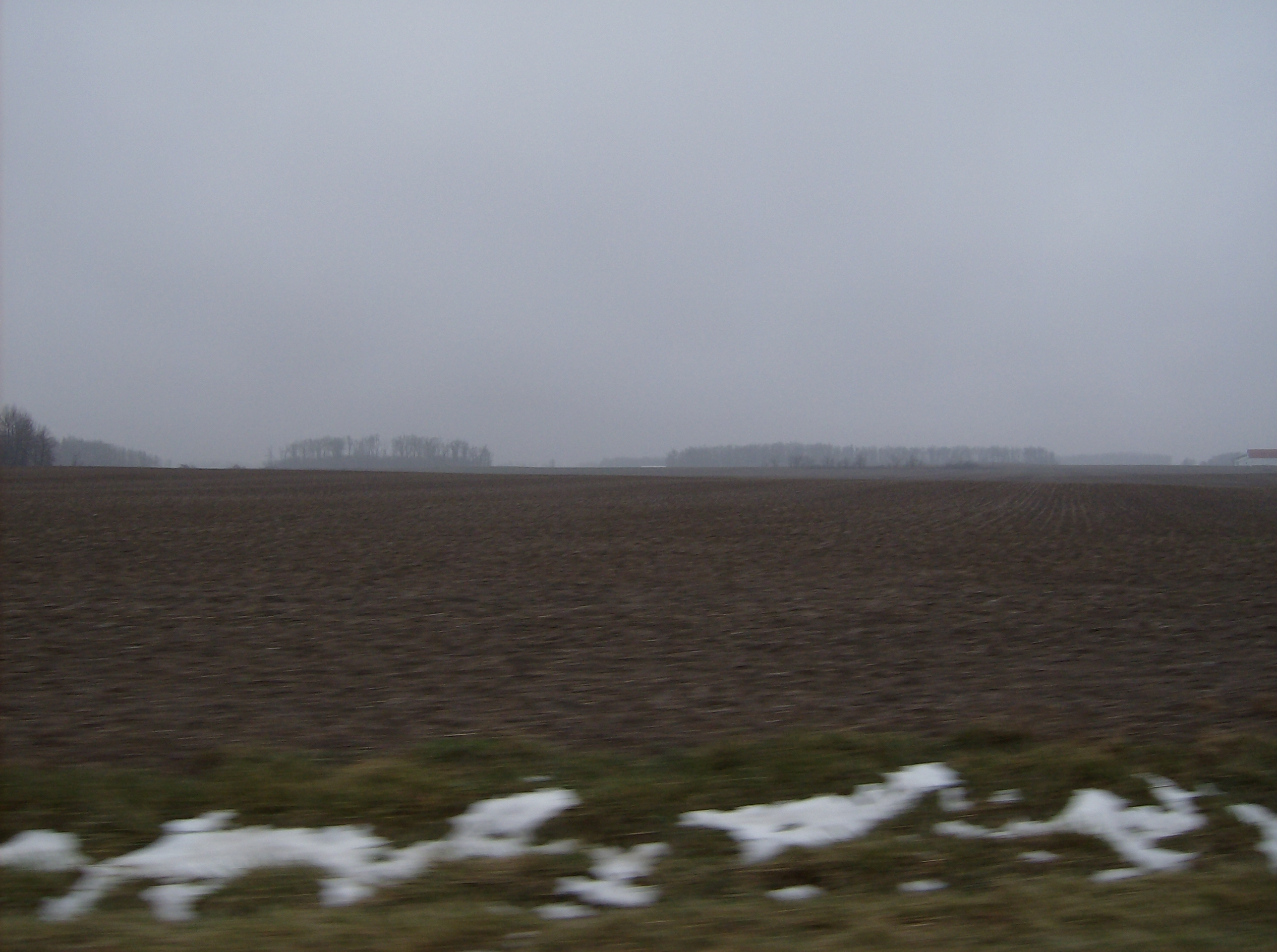
- Fields and woods in Mississinawa Township

- Location in Darke County and the state of Ohio
- Coordinates: 40°18′46″N 84°45′7″W
- Country: United States
- State: Ohio
- County: Darke

Area
  - Total: 29.3 sq mi (76.0 km^{2})
  - Land: 29.3 sq mi (75.8 km^{2})
  - Water: 0.039 sq mi (0.1 km^{2})
- Elevation: 1,060 ft (323 m)

Population (2020)
  - Total: 688
  - Density: 23.5/sq mi (9.08/km^{2})
- Time zone: UTC-5 (Eastern (EST))
  - Summer (DST): UTC-4 (EDT)
- FIPS code: 39-50960
- GNIS feature ID: 1086018

Mississinawa Township is one of the twenty townships of Darke County, Ohio, United States. The 2020 census recorded 688 people living in the township.

== Geography ==
Located in the northwestern corner of the county, it borders the following townships:

- Gibson Township, Mercer County - north
- Allen Township - east
- Jackson Township - south
- Jackson Township, Randolph County, Indiana - southwest
- Madison Township, Jay County, Indiana - northwest

No municipalities are located in Mississinawa Township.

== Name and history ==
Named from the Mississinawa Creek, it is the only Mississinawa Township statewide.

The first settler within the bounds of today's Mississinawa Township was Philip Reprogle, who arrived in 1833. Six years passed before the township's establishment in March 1839; it was created from a part of Jackson Township. Its borders were later extended northward to include part of Gibson Township when the rest of that township became part of Mercer County. The first church in the township was a Methodist congregation that was established in 1851, while the township's first school was founded at an unknown date.

== Government ==
The township is governed by a three-member board of trustees, who are elected in November of odd-numbered years to a four-year term beginning on the following January 1. Two are elected in the year after the presidential election and one is elected in the year before it. There is also an elected township fiscal officer, who serves a four-year term beginning on April 1 of the year after the election, which is held in November of the year before the presidential election. Vacancies in the fiscal officership or on the board of trustees are filled by the remaining trustees.
