= Fort Recovery =

- Fort Recovery Site
- U.S. National Register of Historic Places
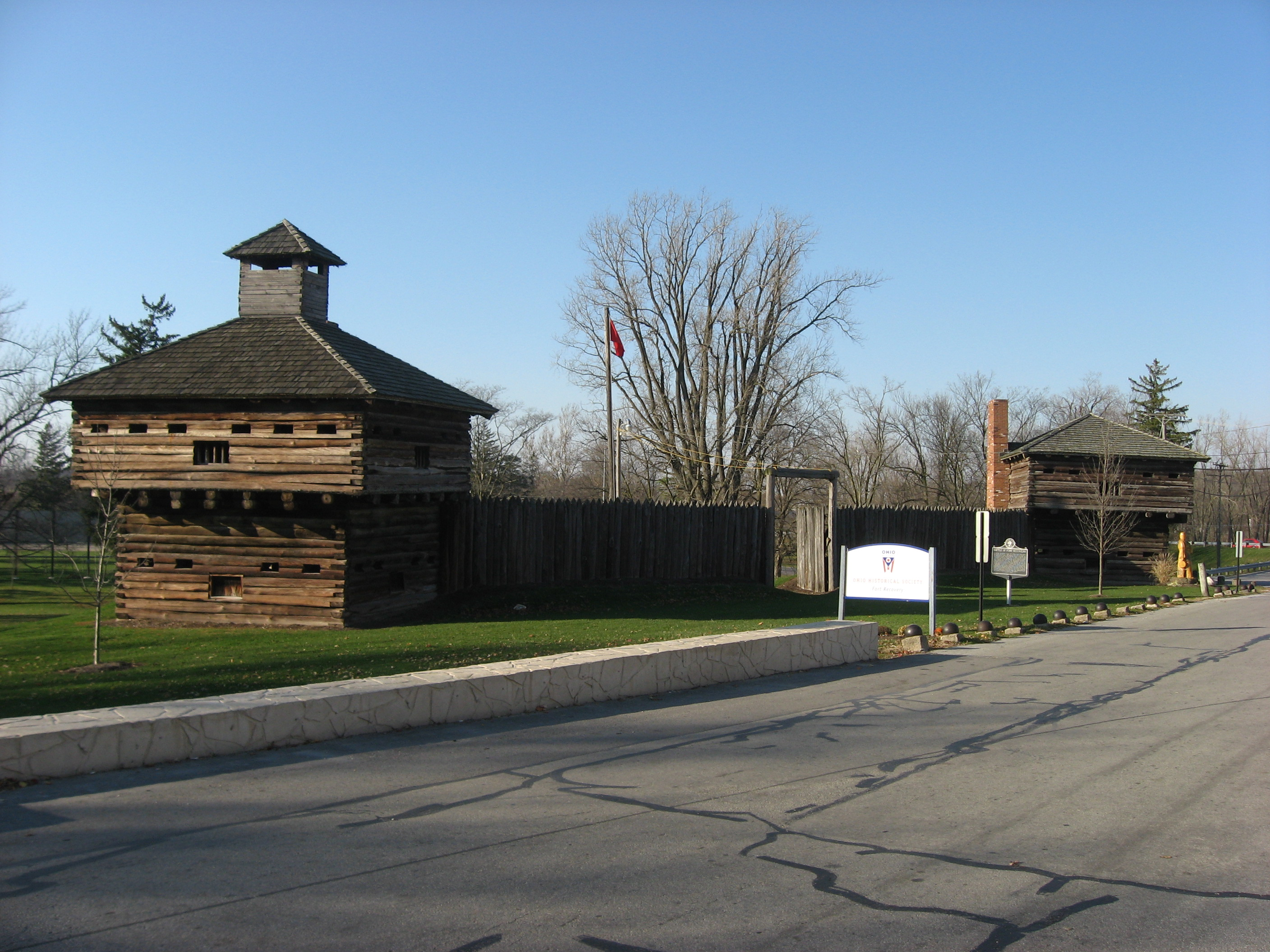
- Blockhouses and stockade walls at the reproduction of Fort Recovery

- Location within Ohio Location within the United States
- Location: State Route 49, Fort Recovery, Ohio
- Coordinates: 40°24′50″N 84°46′51″W
- Area: 5 acres (2.0 ha)
- Built: 1791
- NRHP reference No.: 70000509
- Added to NRHP: November 10, 1970

Fort Recovery was a United States Army fort ordered built by General "Mad" Anthony Wayne during what is now termed the Northwest Indian War. Constructed from late 1793 and completed in March 1794, the fort was built along the Wabash River, within two miles of what became the Ohio state border with Indiana. A detachment of Wayne's Legion of the United States held off an attack from combined Indian forces on June 30, 1794. The fort was used as a reference in drawing treaty lines for the 1795 Treaty of Greenville, and for later settlement. The fort was abandoned in 1796.

The present-day village of Fort Recovery, Ohio developed around the fort and along the river. It includes sites and monuments to commemorate the fort and battles in the area.

== Background ==
General Wayne purposely built the fort at the site where Arthur St. Clair had been defeated in 1791 by an Indian confederacy under Miami Chief Michikinikwa (Little Turtle) and Shawnee Chief Weyapiersenwah (Blue Jacket). That battle, called St. Clair's Defeat, ended St Clair's military career and prompted the United States Congress to undertake a full investigation of the loss.

As a direct result of the Native American victory, the Legion of the United States was founded and placed under the command of General "Mad Anthony" Wayne. Wayne hoped to demonstrate that the United States Army could recover from this crushing defeat and emerge victorious in what was also known as "Little Turtle's War." In late 1793, Wayne led 300 men to the site of St. Clair's defeat and deliberately had Fort Recovery built there. On December 25, they identified the site due to the large amount of unburied remains. Private George Will wrote that to set up camp, the unit had to move bones to make space for their beds. On June 30 of that year, a large Native American force and a few British officers conducted the Siege of Fort Recovery. Although the Legion suffered high casualties, they were able to maintain control of the fort, in part because they had recovered cannons lost by St. Clair in 1791. Wayne used Fort Recovery as a staging ground for advances into the territory. He ultimately defeated the Native American confederacy at the Battle of Fallen Timbers in August 1794. In 1795, confederacy representatives signed the Treaty of Greenville, which ceded control of most of the modern state of Ohio, using Fort Recovery as a reference point for the border between Native American and United States territories.

== Attack on Fort Recovery ==
Fort Recovery had been garrisoned since spring 1794 by a 250-man detachment of Gen. Anthony Wayne's Legion of the United States.

On June 30, 1794, a United States supply column left Fort Recovery for Fort Greenville, under the command of Major William McMahon and escorted by ninety riflemen under Captain Asa Hartshome and fifty dragoons under Lieutenant Edmund Taylor. It had gone only about a quarter mile when it was attacked by Indians led by Shawnee war chief Blue Jacket, and including the young Tecumseh. The dragoons cut a retreat back to the fort, losing thirty-two killed (including Captain Hartshome and Cornet Daniel Torrey) and thirty wounded, while inflicting an unknown number of casualties on their attackers.

During the night, a scouting company under Captain William Wells reported that there were British officers behind the Indian lines, and that they had brought powder and cannonballs, but no cannons. The Indians were looking for U.S. cannons that had been buried after St. Clair's defeat, not knowing that these had already been recovered by the Legion of the United States. The next day, July 1, the Indian forces attacked the fort again, but they began to withdraw by noon, and they were gone by nightfall.

== Boundary marker -Treaty of Greenville ==
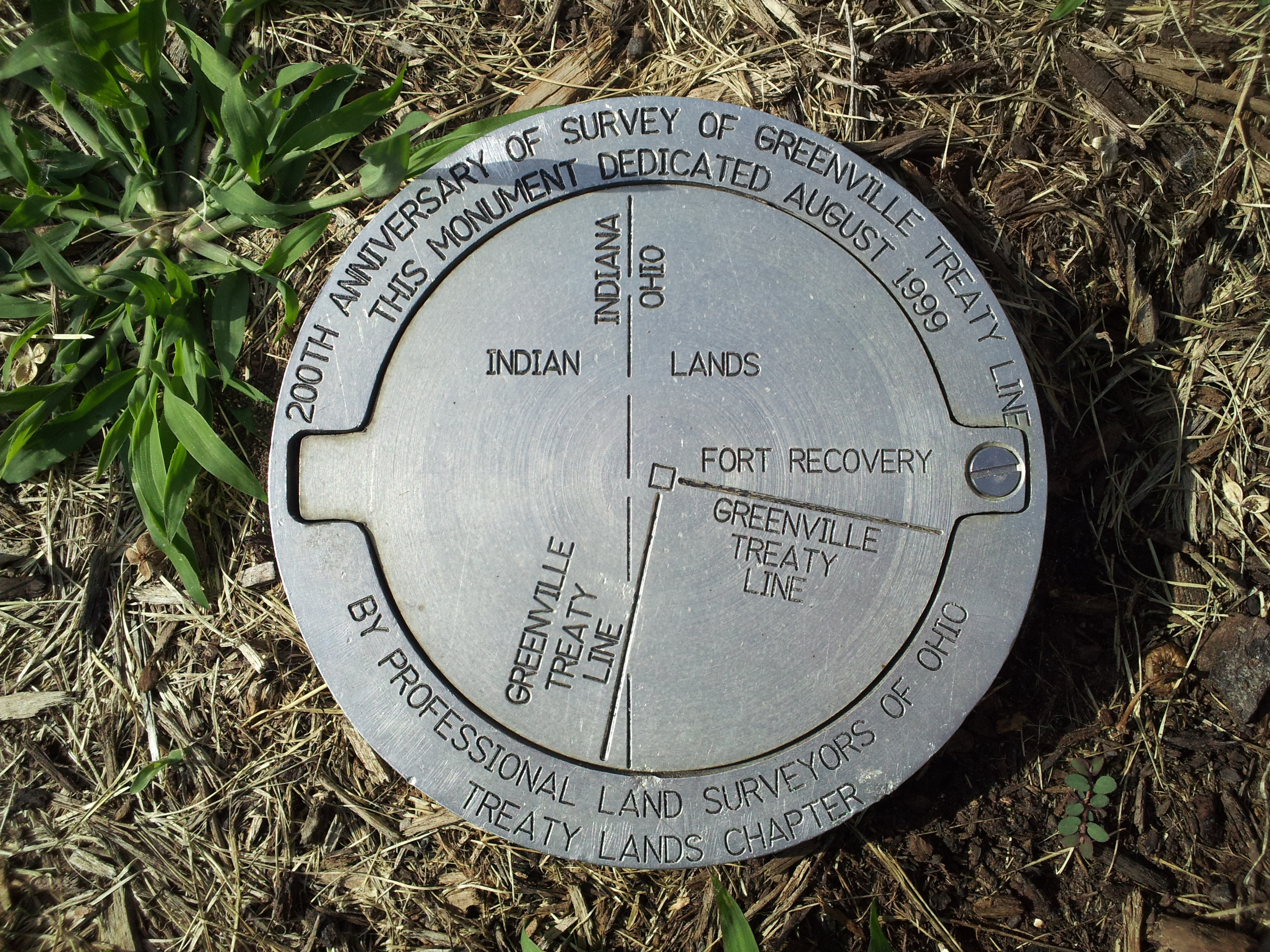
Treaty of Green Ville marker at the site of Fort Recovery

Following Wayne's victory in the Battle of Fallen Timbers, the US offered peace in the 1795 Treaty of Greenville with the regional Indian tribes. Fort Recovery was used as a reference point to define the boundary line established by the treaty between the US and Indian tribal territory. In 1800, the fort was used as a reference point in defining the initial boundaries of the Indiana Territory, when that was first separated from the original Northwest Territory. When Ohio was admitted as a state in 1803, the western boundary was placed a few miles west of Fort Recovery.

== Fort Recovery Memorial ==
In 1891, the battle sites around the fort were excavated. The remains of some 1200 people were buried in a memorial park established in downtown Fort Recovery. In 1908, President William Howard Taft signed a bill that allowed for the building of a monument for those killed under the commands of Arthur St. Clair and Anthony Wayne in Fort Recovery. In 1910, his administration gave the village of Fort Recovery $25,000 to commission the monument.

The monument, in the form of an obelisk, was built in 1912 and dedicated on July 1, 1913. The obelisk stands 101 feet 4 inches (30.89 m) tall. It weighs approximately 800 short tons (730 t) and cost $23,700 to build. Today that monument is part of a historical landmark known as Fort Recovery State Memorial, which is maintained by the Ohio History Connection. A replica of Wayne's fort has two reconstructed blockhouses with a connecting stockade.

The Fort Recovery State Museum, opened in 1938 during the Great Depression. It features life-size dioramas of fort soldiers and the various Indian tribes involved in the fighting. Exhibits explain Wayne's campaign and include military and Indian artifacts, uniforms, weapons, paintings and maps. The museum features a gift shop and offers programs for school groups.

In 2011, students from Ball State University found the original location of a fort wall, not far from the Fort Recovery state museum.

== See also ==
- Fort Defiance
