= Philothea, Ohio =

Unincorporated community in Ohio, U.S.

Coordinates: 40°27′02″N 84°39′13″W

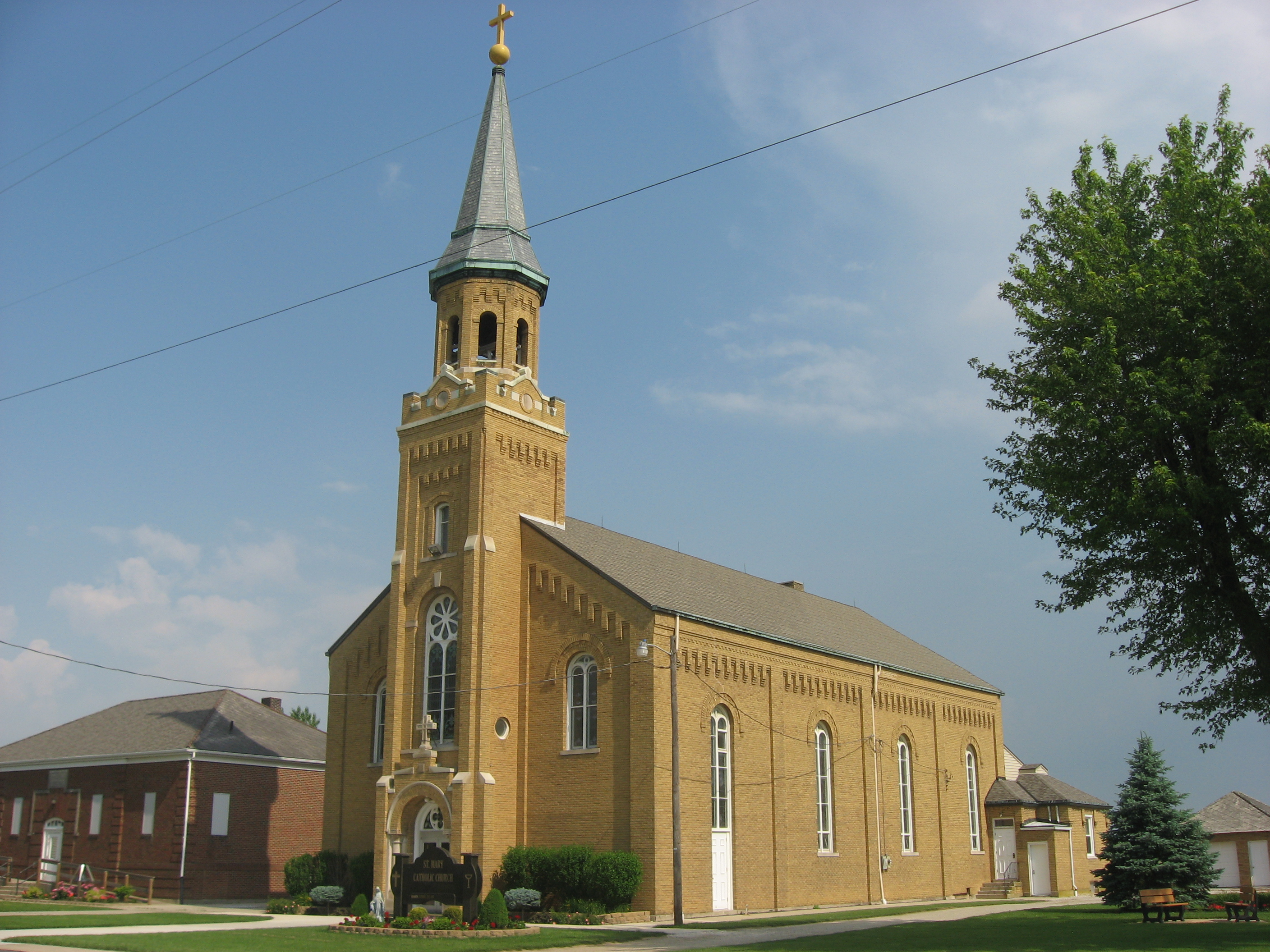
St. Mary's Catholic Church (Philothea, Ohio)

Philothea is an unincorporated community in Mercer County, in the U.S. state of Ohio.

== History ==
A post office called Philothea was established in 1886, and remained in operation until 1904. Besides the post office, Philothea had a Catholic church and several stores.
