= Tiverton Township, Coshocton County, Ohio =

Township in Ohio, US

- Township
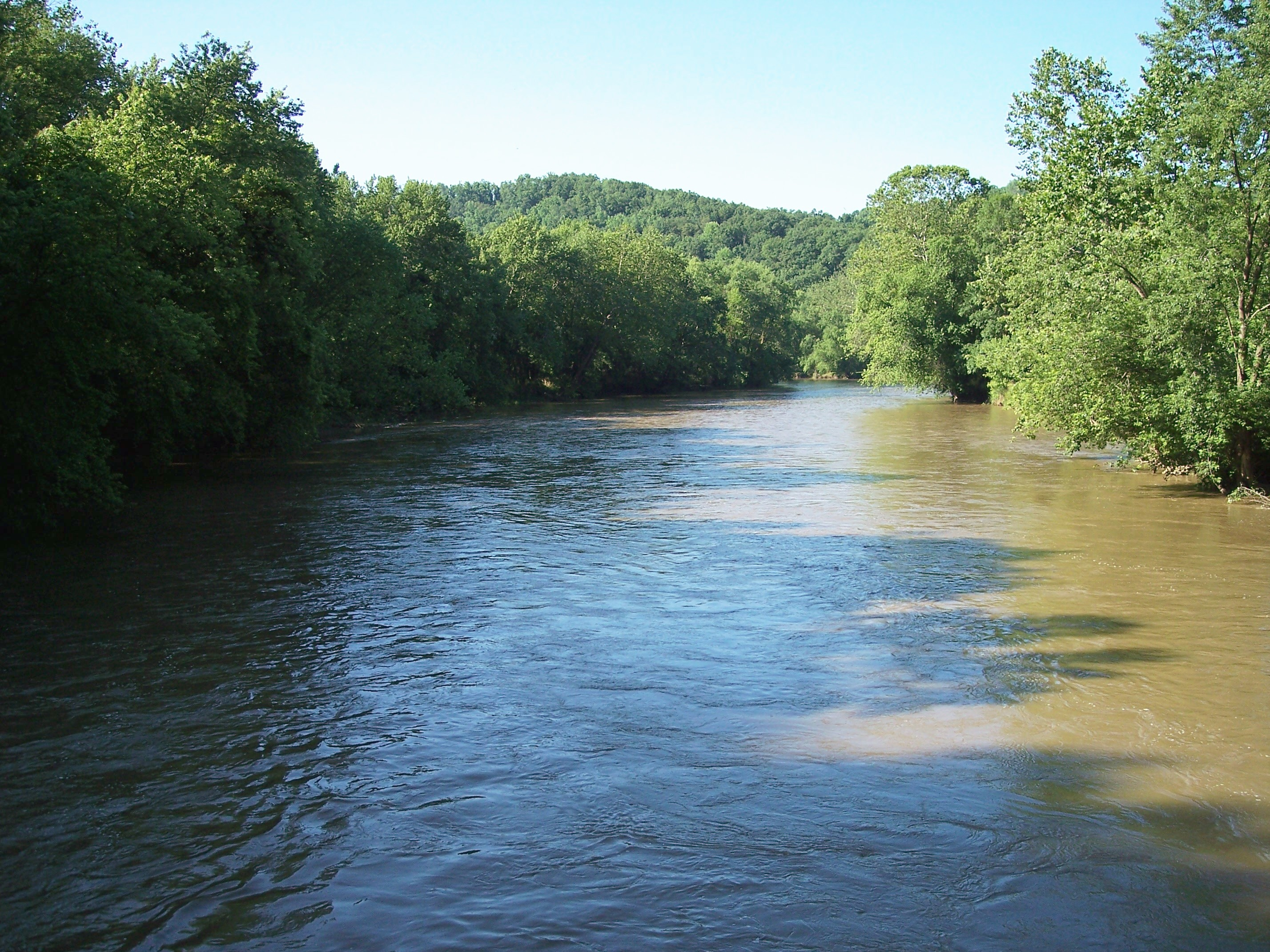
- The Mohican River from the County Road 365 bridge

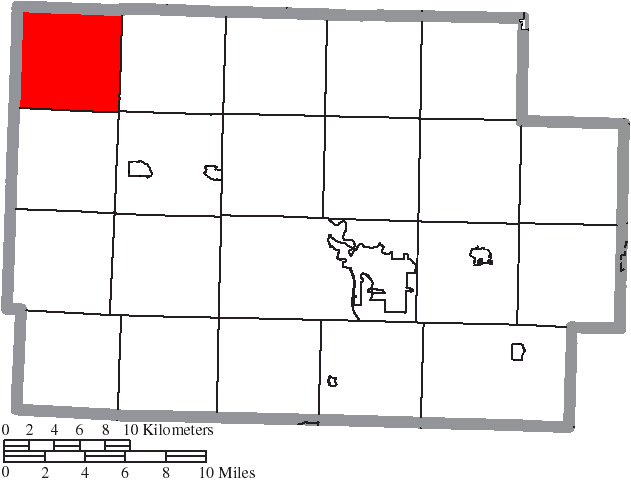
- Location of Tiverton Township in Coshocton County
- Coordinates: 40°24′18″N 82°9′8″W
- Country: United States
- State: Ohio
- County: Coshocton

Area
  - Total: 26.20 sq mi (67.86 km^{2})
  - Land: 26.19 sq mi (67.82 km^{2})
  - Water: 0.019 sq mi (0.05 km^{2})
- Elevation: 1,142 ft (348 m)

Population (2020)
  - Total: 492
  - Density: 18.8/sq mi (7.25/km^{2})
- Time zone: UTC-5 (Eastern (EST))
  - Summer (DST): UTC-4 (EDT)
- FIPS code: 39-76953
- GNIS feature ID: 1085927

Tiverton Township is one of the twenty-two townships of Coshocton County, Ohio, United States. As of the 2020 census the population was 492.

== Geography ==
Located in the northwestern corner of the county, it borders the following townships:

- Richland Township, Holmes County - north
- Monroe Township - east
- Jefferson Township - southeast corner
- Newcastle Township - south
- Butler Township, Knox County - southwest corner
- Union Township, Knox County - west

No municipalities are located in Tiverton Township.

== Name and history ==
It is the only Tiverton Township statewide.

Tiverton Township was organized in 1824 by the name of Union Township, but by 1825, the name was changed to Tiverton. It was named for Tiverton, Rhode Island, the former hometown of a large share of the first settlers.

== Government ==
The township is governed by a three-member board of trustees, who are elected in November of odd-numbered years to a four-year term beginning on the following January 1. Two are elected in the year after the presidential election and one is elected in the year before it. There is also an elected township fiscal officer, who serves a four-year term beginning on April 1 of the year after the election, which is held in November of the year before the presidential election. Vacancies in the fiscal officership or on the board of trustees are filled by the remaining trustees.
