= Granville Township, Mercer County, Ohio =

Township in Ohio, US

- Township
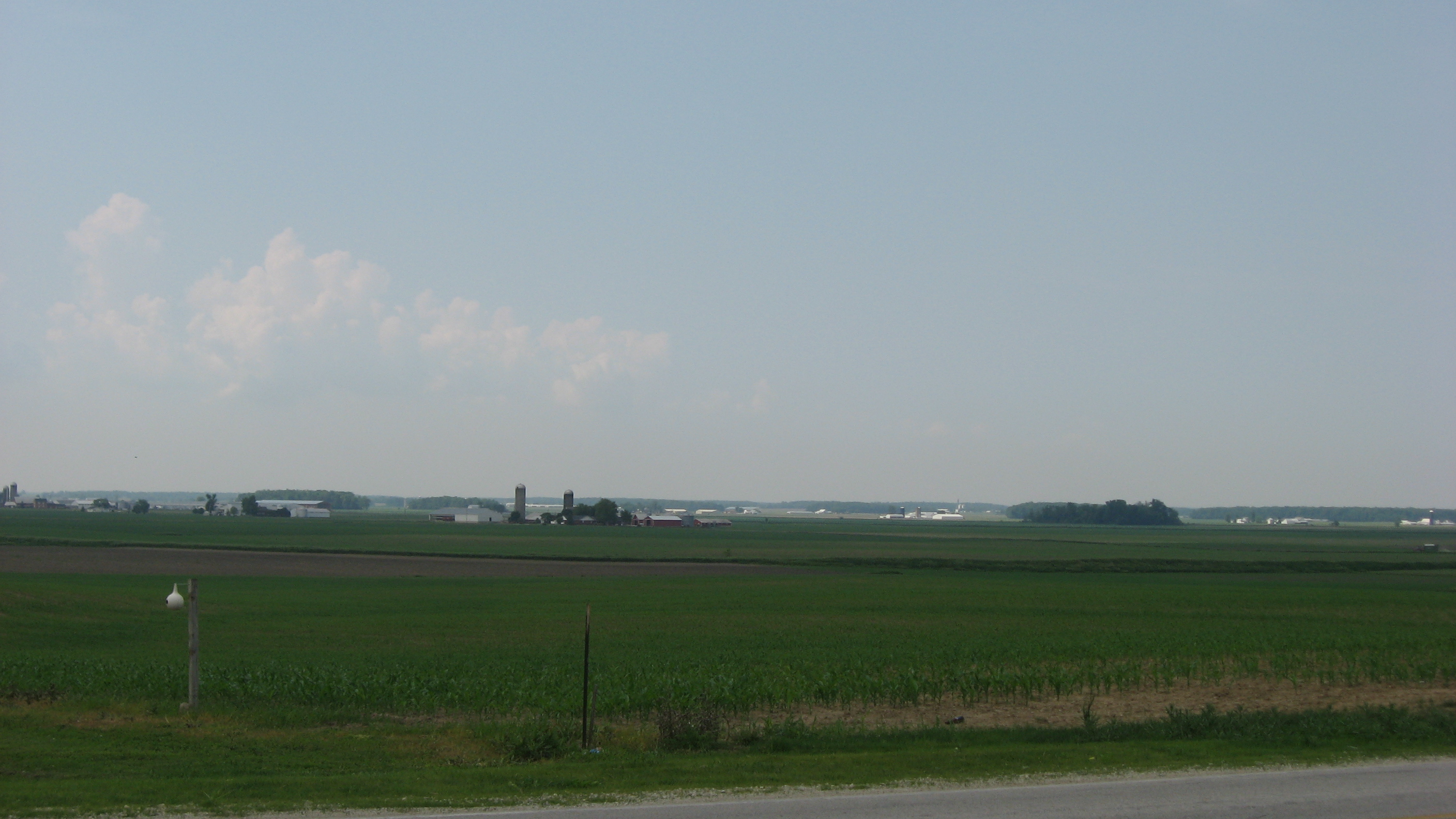
- The Cranberry Prairie, a wide field in the township

- Location in Mercer County and the state of Ohio.
- Coordinates: 40°23′58″N 84°38′11″W
- Country: United States
- State: Ohio
- County: Mercer

Area
  - Total: 39.2 sq mi (101.5 km^{2})
  - Land: 39.2 sq mi (101.5 km^{2})
  - Water: 0 sq mi (0.0 km^{2})
- Elevation: 997 ft (304 m)

Population (2020)
  - Total: 4,227
  - Density: 107.9/sq mi (41.65/km^{2})
- Time zone: UTC-5 (Eastern (EST))
  - Summer (DST): UTC-4 (EDT)
- FIPS code: 39-31430
- GNIS feature ID: 1086626

Granville Township is one of the fourteen townships of Mercer County, Ohio, United States. The population of the township was 4,227 at the 2020 census.

== Geography ==
Located in the southern part of the county, it borders the following townships:

- Butler Township – north
- Marion Township – east
- Wabash Township, Darke County – southeast
- Allen Township, Darke County – southwest
- Gibson Township – west
- Recovery Township – northwest

Two incorporated villages are located in Granville Township: part of Burkettsville in the south, and St. Henry in the north.

== Name and history ==
Granville Township was established in 1837. The only other Granville Township in Ohio is in Licking County.

== Government ==
The township is governed by a three-member board of trustees, who are elected in November of odd-numbered years to a four-year term beginning on the following January 1. Two are elected in the year after the presidential election and one is elected in the year before it. There is also an elected township fiscal officer, who serves a four-year term beginning on April 1 of the year after the election, which is held in November of the year before the presidential election. Vacancies in the fiscal officership or on the board of trustees are filled by the remaining trustees.
