= Butler Township, Montgomery County, Ohio =

Township in Ohio, US

- Township
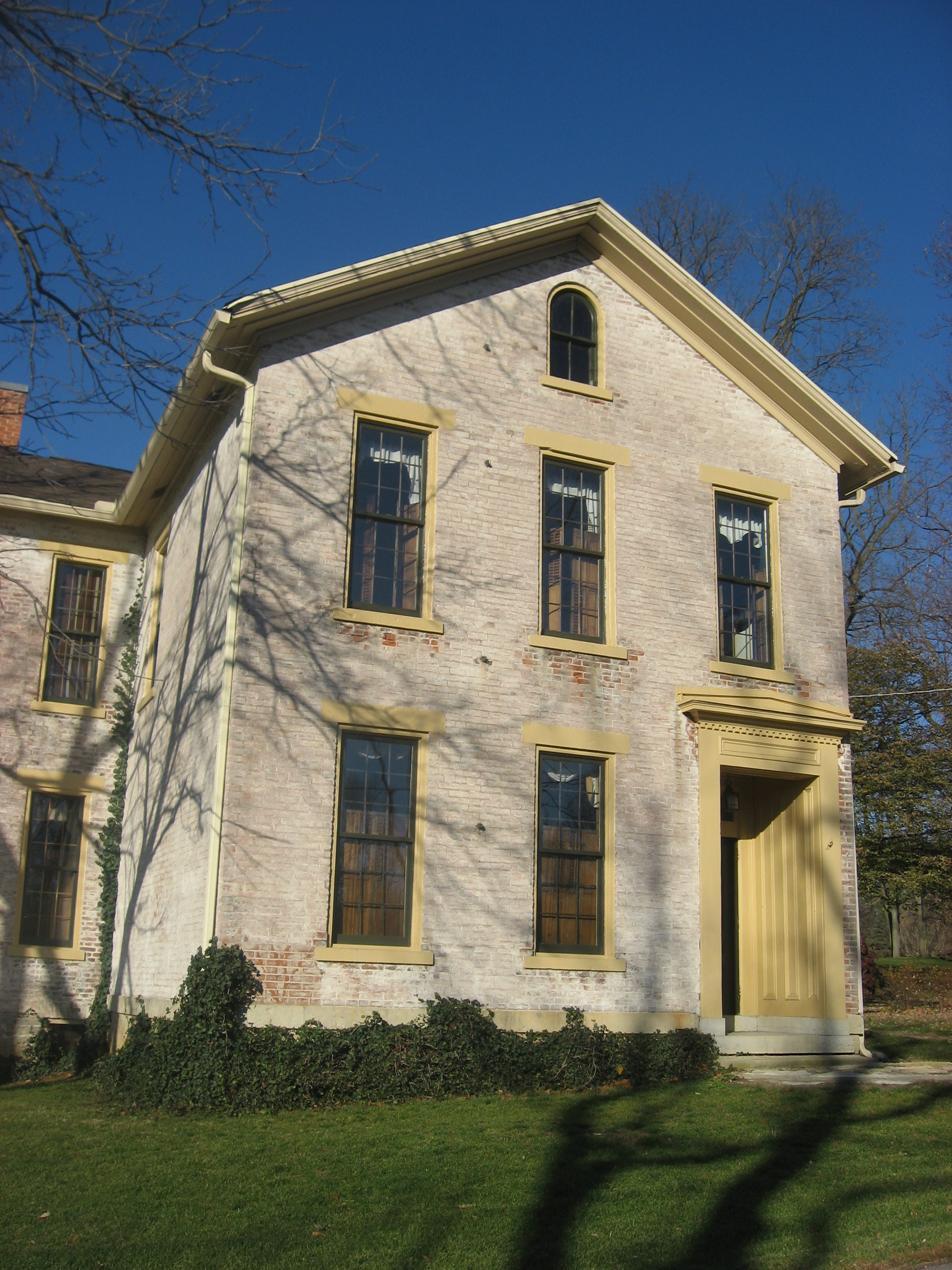
- The Samuel Martindale House, a historic house in the township

- Location in Montgomery County and the state of Ohio.
- Coordinates: 39°52′14″N 84°13′44″W
- Country: United States
- State: Ohio
- County: Montgomery

Area
  - Total: 20.1 sq mi (52.1 km^{2})
  - Land: 19.8 sq mi (51.3 km^{2})
  - Water: 0.31 sq mi (0.8 km^{2})
- Elevation: 965 ft (294 m)

Population (2020)
  - Total: 8,269
  - Density: 417/sq mi (161/km^{2})
- Time zone: UTC-5 (Eastern (EST))
  - Summer (DST): UTC-4 (EDT)
- FIPS code: 39-10618
- GNIS feature ID: 1086664

Butler Township is one of the nine townships of Montgomery County, Ohio, United States. As of the 2020 census, the population was 8,269.

== Geography ==
Located in the northern part of the county, it borders the following townships and cities:

- Monroe Township, Miami County - north
- Vandalia - east
- Dayton - southeast
- Harrison Township - south
- Clayton - southwest
- Englewood - west
- Union Township, Miami County - northwest

Three cities are located in what was originally parts of Butler Township:

- Part of Dayton, the county seat of Montgomery County, in the northeast and a smaller portion in the southeast
- Part of Union, in the northwest
- Vandalia, in the east

== Name and history ==
It is one of six Butler Townships statewide.

Butler Township was described in 1833 as having five gristmills, four saw mills, one fulling mill, two tanneries, five distilleries, and one woolen factory.

== Government ==
The township is governed by a three-member board of trustees, who are elected in November of odd-numbered years to a four-year term beginning on the following January 1. Two are elected in the year after the presidential election and one is elected in the year before it. There is also an elected township fiscal officer, who serves a four-year term beginning on April 1 of the year after the election, which is held in November of the year before the presidential election. Vacancies in the fiscal officership or on the board of trustees are filled by the remaining trustees.

Trustees:

Missy Pruszynski (President)

Mike Thein

Bryson Jackson

Fiscal Officer: Gregory A. Brush
