= Recovery Township, Mercer County, Ohio =

Township in Ohio, US

- Township
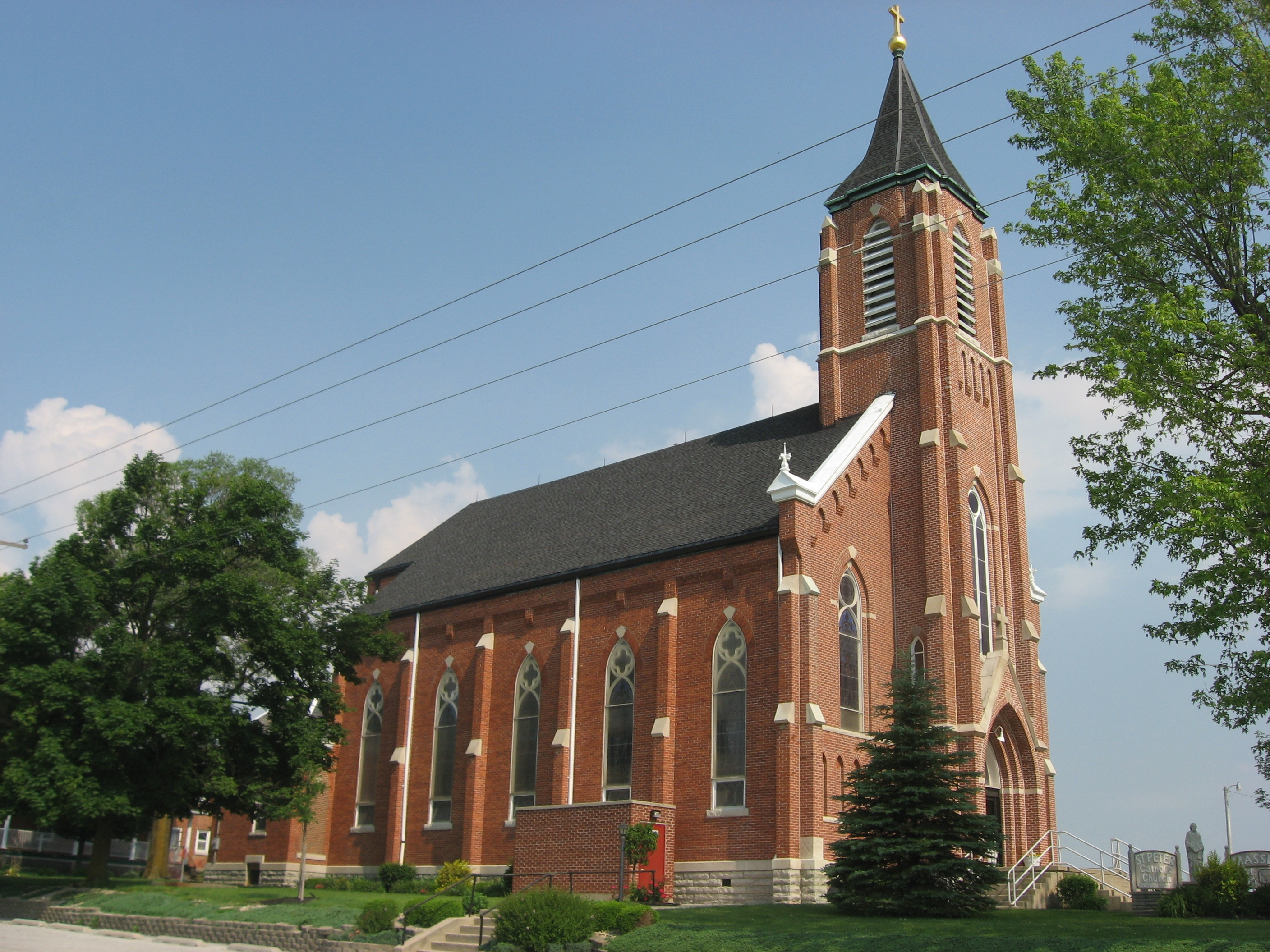
- St. Peter's Catholic Church, a township landmark

- Location in Mercer County and the state of Ohio.
- Coordinates: 40°25′26″N 84°45′23″W
- Country: United States
- State: Ohio
- County: Mercer

Area
  - Total: 24.4 sq mi (63.3 km^{2})
  - Land: 24.4 sq mi (63.2 km^{2})
  - Water: 0.039 sq mi (0.1 km^{2})
- Elevation: 988 ft (301 m)

Population (2020)
  - Total: 1,523
  - Density: 62.4/sq mi (24.1/km^{2})
- Time zone: UTC-5 (Eastern (EST))
  - Summer (DST): UTC-4 (EDT)
- FIPS code: 39-65781
- GNIS feature ID: 1086631

Recovery Township is one of the fourteen townships of Mercer County, Ohio, United States. The 2020 census found 1,523 people in the township.

== Geography ==
Located in the southwestern part of the county, it borders the following townships:

- Washington Township – north
- Butler Township – northeast
- Granville Township – southeast
- Gibson Township – south
- Madison Township, Jay County, Indiana – southwest corner
- Noble Township, Jay County, Indiana – west

Part of the village of Fort Recovery is located in southwestern Recovery Township.

== Name and history ==
Recovery Township was established in 1831. It is the only Recovery Township statewide.

== Government ==
The township is governed by a three-member board of trustees, who are elected in November of odd-numbered years to a four-year term beginning on the following January 1. Two are elected in the year after the presidential election and one is elected in the year before it. There is also an elected township fiscal officer, who serves a four-year term beginning on April 1 of the year after the election, which is held in November of the year before the presidential election. Vacancies in the fiscal officership or on the board of trustees are filled by the remaining trustees.
