= Fort Recovery, Ohio =

- Village
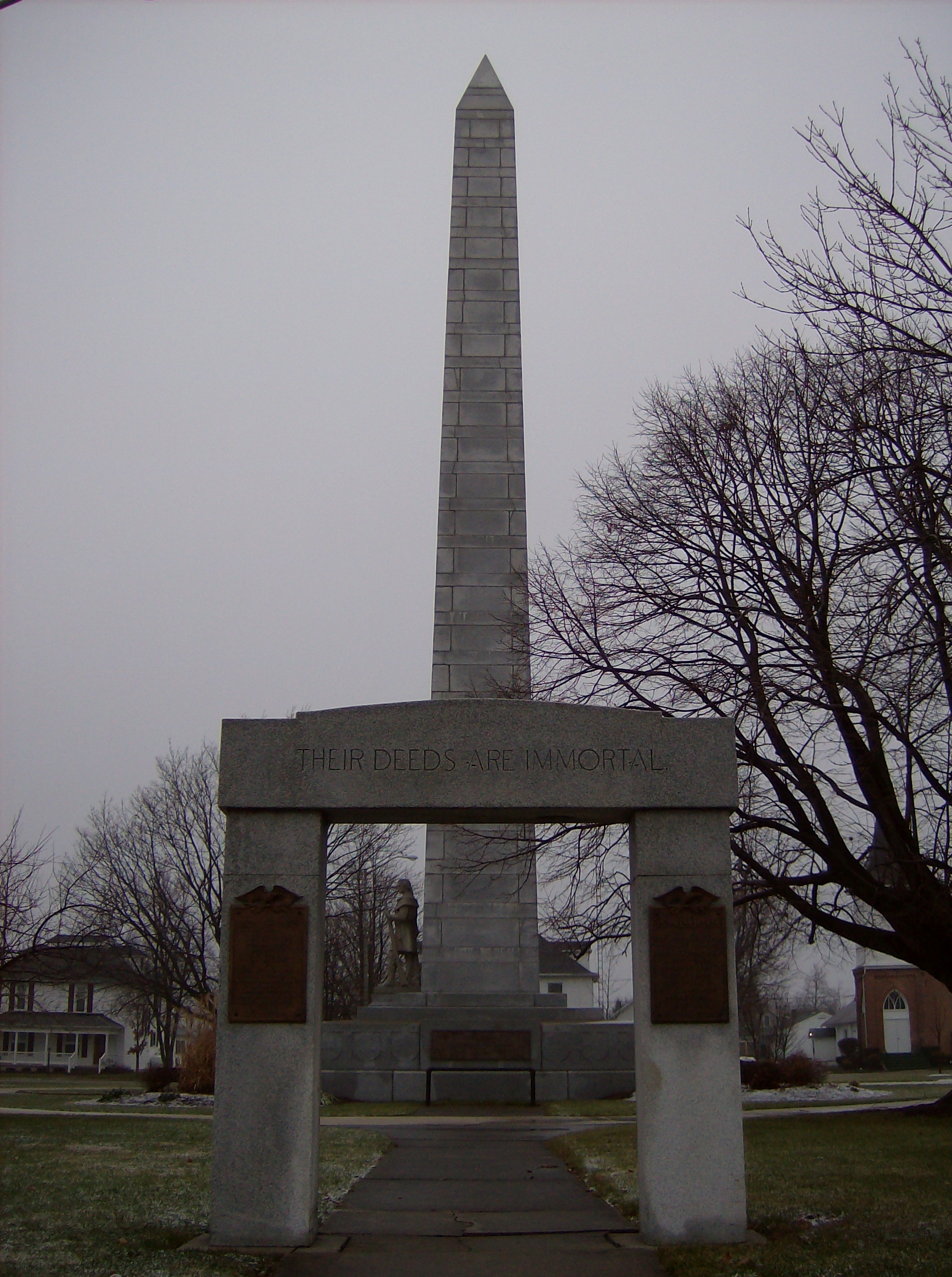
- Victory monument in Fort Recovery

- Location of Fort Recovery in Mercer County and of Mercer County in Ohio
- Coordinates: 40°24′43″N 84°46′35″W
- Country: United States
- State: Ohio
- County: Mercer
- Townships: Gibson and Recovery

Government
  - Mayor: Dave Kaup
  - Village administrator: Randy Diller

Area
  - Total: 1.25 sq mi (3.25 km^{2})
  - Land: 1.24 sq mi (3.20 km^{2})
  - Water: 0.019 sq mi (0.05 km^{2})
- Elevation: 942 ft (287 m)

Population (2020)
  - Total: 1,501
  - Estimate (2024): 1,474
  - Density: 1,216.6/sq mi (469.74/km^{2})
- Time zone: UTC-5 (Eastern (EST))
  - Summer (DST): UTC-4 (EDT)
- ZIP Code: 45846
- Area code: 419
- FIPS code: 39-27902
- GNIS feature ID: 2398904
- Website: www.fortrecoveryohio.gov

Fort Recovery is a village in Mercer County, Ohio, United States. The population was 1,501 at the 2020 census. The village is near the location of Fort Recovery, first established in 1793 under orders from General Anthony Wayne. The town is located near the headwaters of the Wabash River.

== History ==
Two significant battles of the Northwest Indian War took place at Fort Recovery. At the time, Ohio was claimed and populated by Native American nations, and conflict broke out when the young United States established settlements north of the Ohio River. In 1791, Northwest Territory governor Arthur St. Clair led a campaign north from Fort Washington to pacify the Western Confederacy at Kekionga. Instead, the United States force was destroyed in the early morning of November 4. St. Clair's Defeat remains the greatest loss by the United States Army to a Native American force.

As a direct result of the Native American victory, the Legion of the United States was founded and placed under the command of General "Mad Anthony" Wayne. In late 1793, Wayne led 300 men to the site of St. Clair's defeat and deliberately had Fort Recovery built there. On December 25, they identified the site due to the large amount of unburied remains. Private George Will wrote that to set up camp, the unit had to move bones to make space for their beds. On June 30 of the following year, a large Native American force and a few British officers conducted the Siege of Fort Recovery. Although the Legion suffered high casualties, they were able to maintain control of the fort, in part because they had recovered cannons lost by St. Clair in 1791. Wayne used Fort Recovery as a staging ground for advances into the territory. He ultimately defeated the Native American confederacy at the Battle of Fallen Timbers in August 1794. In 1795, confederacy representatives signed the Treaty of Greenville, which ceded control of most of the modern state of Ohio, using Fort Recovery as a reference point for the border between Native American and United States territories.

In 1818, a Virginia soldier who fought at the battle of St. Clair's Defeat returned to the area in search of silver he left by a standing oak tree. The soldier remained in the area for an unknown amount of time and was later found dead in the woods. In 1852, a local resident struck metal with a grubbing hoe. The metal was iron bands encasing a small wooden box, and 900 Spanish doubloons were found, valued at $14,000 (equivalent to $541,800 in today's dollars).

In September 1851, the town organized Bone Burying Day, to inter the remains of bones that had been discovered from the battles at that location.

== Geography ==
Fort Recovery is located at 40°24′44″N 84°46′40″W.

According to the U.S. Census Bureau, Fort Recovery has a total area of 1.07 square miles (2.77 km^{2}), of which 1.05 square miles (2.72 km^{2}) is land and 0.02 square miles (0.05 km^{2}) is water.

The northwest corner of the Greenville Treaty Line is located in Fort Recovery.

Fort Recovery is located at the confluence of a number of major area roads, including State Route 119, State Route 49, Sharpsburg Road, Union City Road, Wabash Road, and Fort Recovery-Minster Road. Fort Recovery was a stop along the New York, Chicago and St. Louis Railroad that connected Buffalo to Chicago and St. Louis.

The Wabash River passes through Fort Recovery.

== Demographics ==
Historical population
| Census | Pop. | Note | %± |
|---|---|---|---|
| 1870 | 89 | | — |
| 1880 | 102 | | 14.6% |
| 1890 | 456 | | 347.1% |
| 1900 | 698 | | 53.1% |
| 1910 | 708 | | 1.4% |
| 1920 | 754 | | 6.5% |
| 1930 | 796 | | 5.6% |
| 1940 | 822 | | 3.3% |
| 1950 | 827 | | 0.6% |
| 1960 | 833 | | 0.7% |
| 1970 | 847 | | 1.7% |
| 1980 | 859 | | 1.4% |
| 1990 | 901 | | 4.9% |
| 2000 | 1,006 | | 11.7% |
| 2010 | 1,430 | | 42.1% |
| 2020 | 1,501 | | 5.0% |
| 2024 (est.) | 1,474 | ▼ | −1.8% |
U.S. Decennial Census

=== 2010 census ===
As of the census of 2010, there were 1,430 people, 555 households, and 391 families living in the village. The population density was 1,361.9 inhabitants per square mile (525.8/km^{2}). There were 589 housing units at an average density of 561.0 per square mile (216.6/km^{2}). The racial makeup of the village was 97.7% White, 0.1% African American, 0.1% Native American, 0.1% Asian, 0.7% from other races, and 1.3% from two or more races. Hispanic or Latino of any race were 1.1% of the population.

There were 555 households, of which 32.6% had children under the age of 18 living with them, 56.8% were married couples living together, 9.9% had a female householder with no husband present, 3.8% had a male householder with no wife present, and 29.5% were non-families. 27.9% of all households were made up of individuals, and 12.1% had someone living alone who was 65 years of age or older. The average household size was 2.58 and the average family size was 3.16.

The median age in the village was 34.8 years. 28.2% of residents were under the age of 18; 6.6% were between the ages of 18 and 24; 26.7% were from 25 to 44; 24% were from 45 to 64; and 14.7% were 65 years of age or older. The gender makeup of the village was 51.0% male and 49.0% female.

== Notable people ==
- Richard Butler, general killed at St. Clair's defeat, buried at Fort Recovery
- Rick Derringer, rock guitarist, vocalist, and entertainer
- Richard Schoen, award-winning mathematician at the University of California, Irvine
- Henry Schwartz, U.S. Senator from Wyoming

== Gallery ==
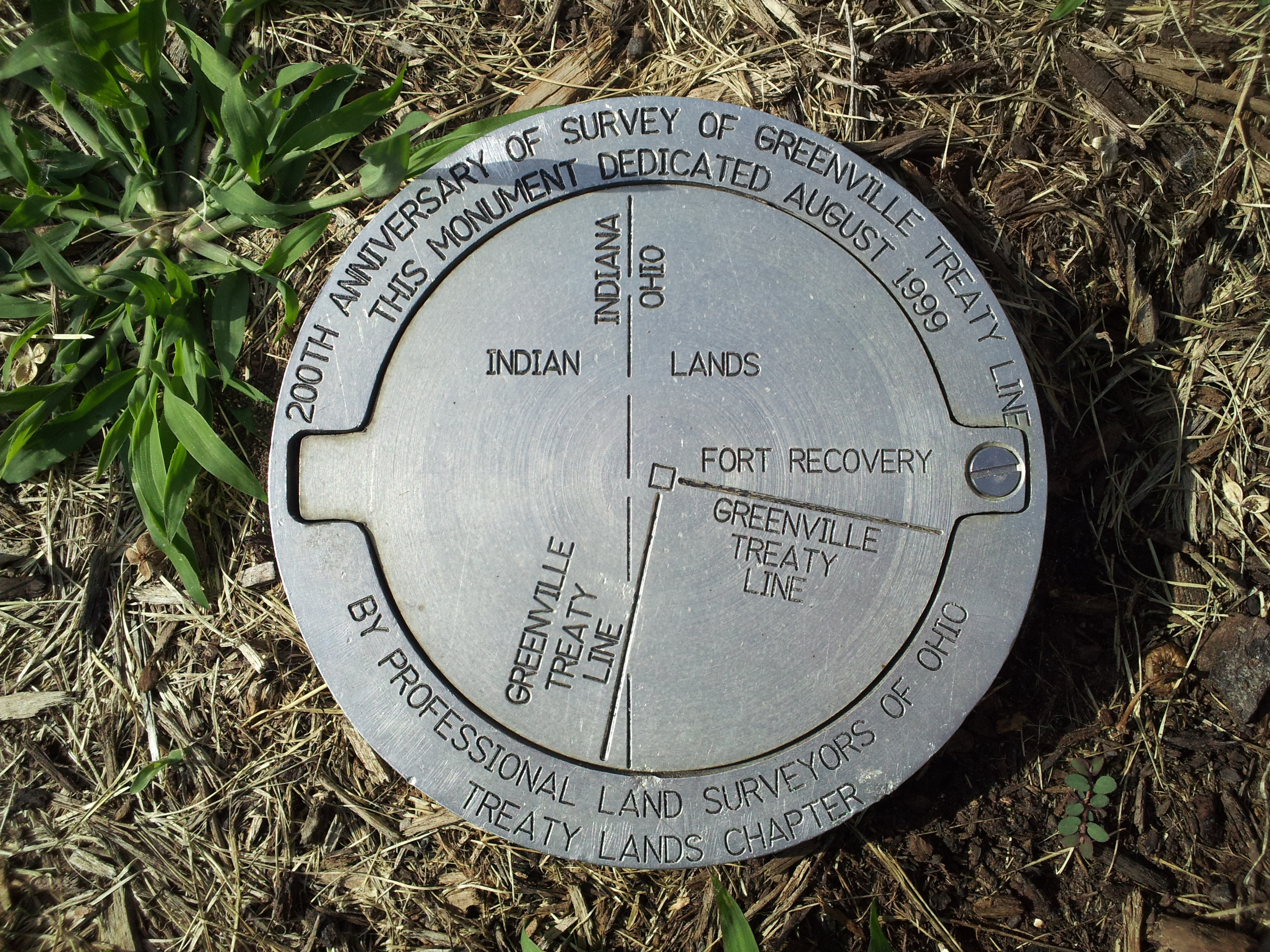
A Greenville Treaty Line marker at Fort Recovery

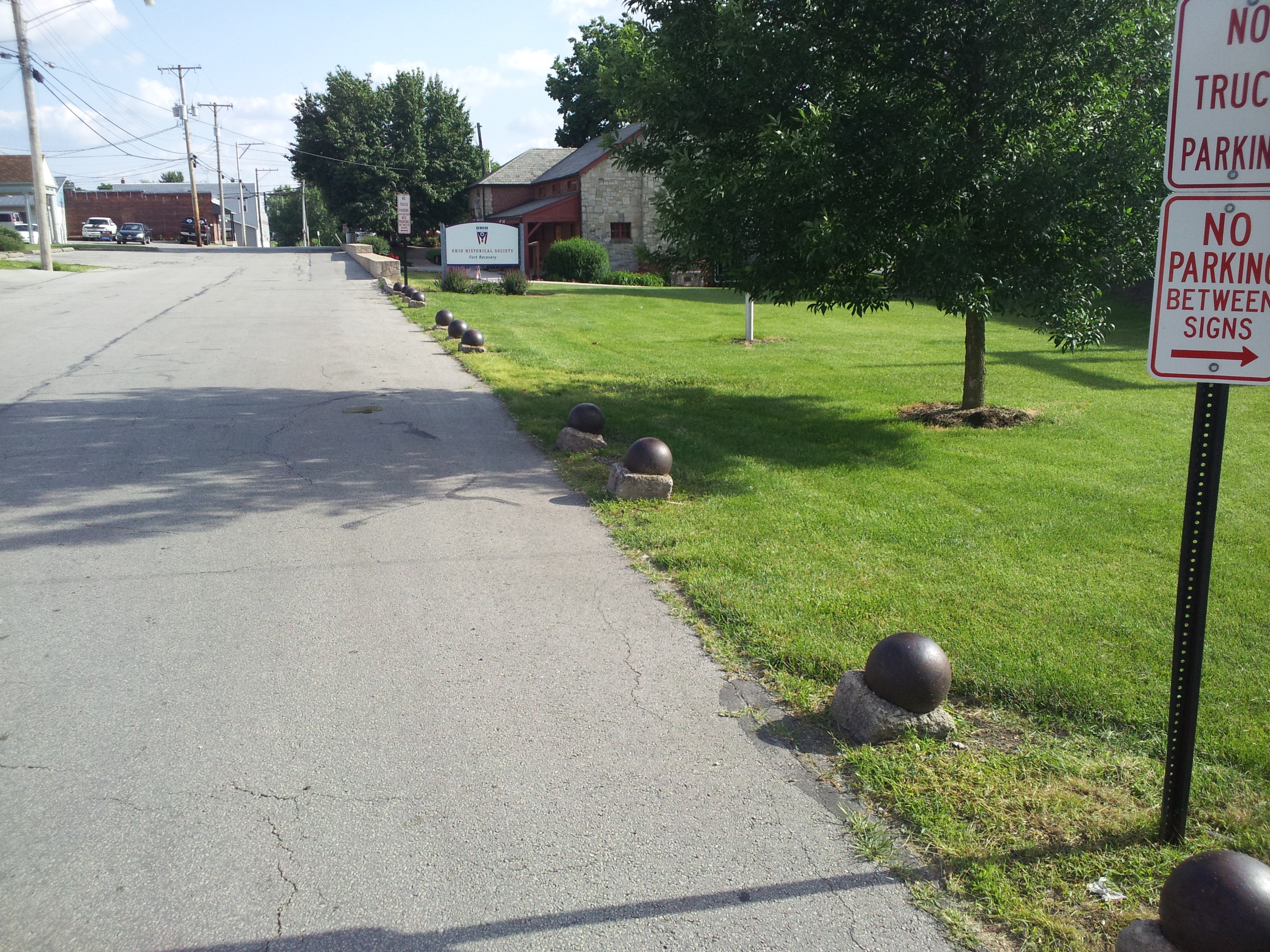
Cannonballs left from the battle are on display at the Fort
