= Gibson Township, Mercer County, Ohio =

Township in Ohio, US

Gibson Township, Ohio
- Township
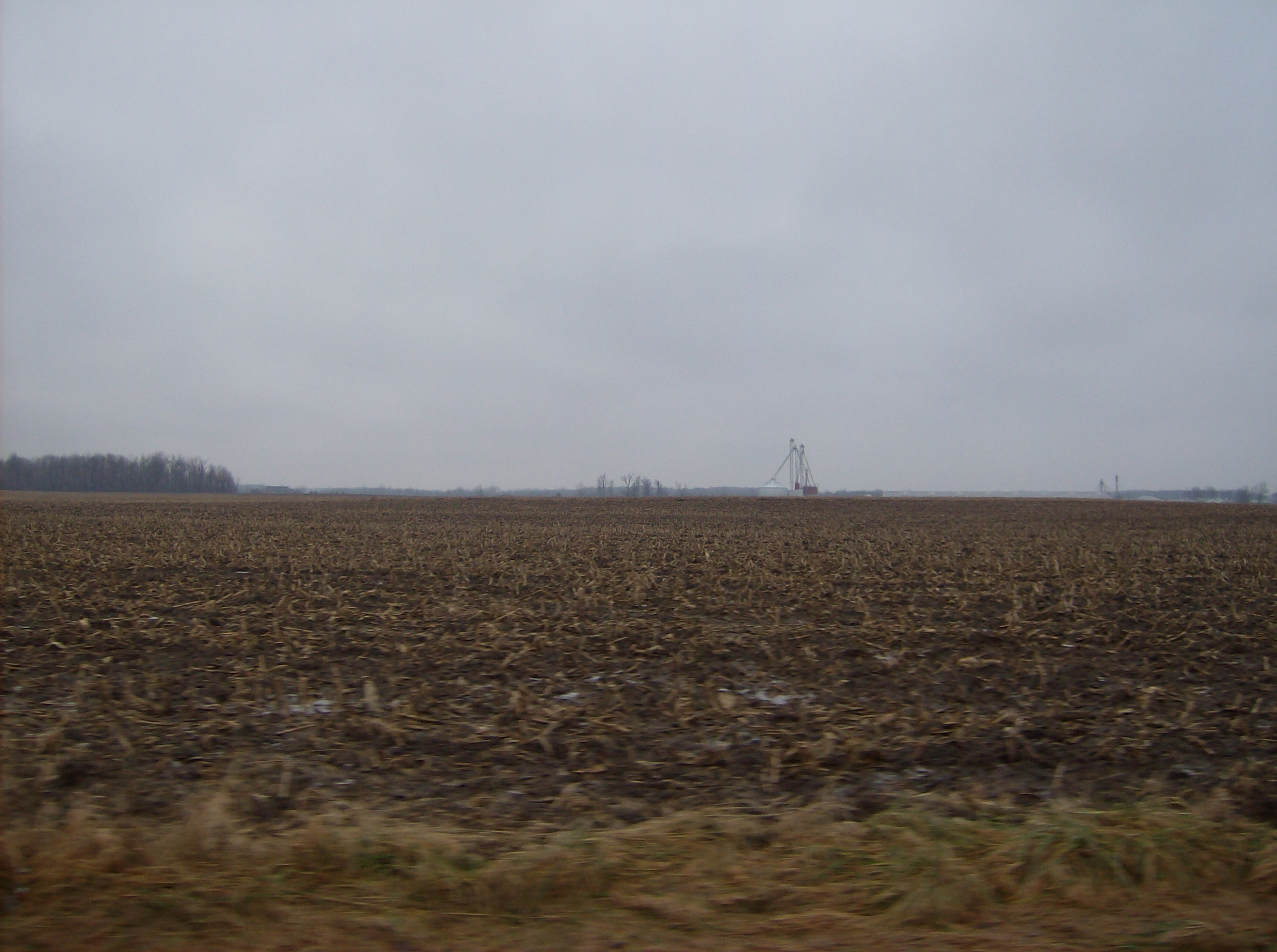
- Countryside and a farm in Gibson Township

- Location in Mercer County and the state of Ohio.
- Coordinates: 40°23′43″N 84°45′53″W
- Country: United States
- State: Ohio
- County: Mercer

Area
  - Total: 22.5 sq mi (58.4 km^{2})
  - Land: 22.5 sq mi (58.4 km^{2})
  - Water: 0 sq mi (0.0 km^{2})
- Elevation: 981 ft (299 m)

Population (2020)
  - Total: 2,121
  - Density: 94.1/sq mi (36.3/km^{2})
- Time zone: UTC-5 (Eastern (EST))
  - Summer (DST): UTC-4 (EDT)
- FIPS code: 39-30058
- GNIS feature ID: 1086625

Gibson Township is one of the fourteen townships of Mercer County, Ohio, United States. The 2020 census found 2,121 people in the township.

== Geography ==
Located in the southwestern corner of the county, it borders the following townships:

- Recovery Township – north
- Granville Township – east
- Allen Township, Darke County – southeast
- Mississinawa Township, Darke County – south
- Madison Township, Jay County, Indiana – west
- Noble Township, Jay County, Indiana – northwest corner

Part of the village of Fort Recovery is located in northwestern Gibson Township.

== Name and history ==
It is the only Gibson Township statewide.

== Government ==
The township is governed by a three-member board of trustees, who are elected in November of odd-numbered years to a four-year term beginning on the following January 1. Two are elected in the year after the presidential election and one is elected in the year before it. There is also an elected township fiscal officer, who serves a four-year term beginning on April 1 of the year after the election, which is held in November of the year before the presidential election. Vacancies in the fiscal officership or on the board of trustees are filled by the remaining trustees.
