= Savona (disambiguation) =

Savona may refer to:

== Places ==
- Savona, Liguria, Italy
  - Province of Savona, Liguria, Italy
  - Roman Catholic Diocese of Savona–Noli, Liguria, Italy
- Savona, British Columbia, Canada
  - Mount Savona Provincial Park, British Columbia, Canada
- Savona, New York, United States
- Savona, Ohio, United States
- Nueva Savona, Montevideo, Uruguay

== People ==
- Savona (name), people with the name Savona
- The Musical Savonas, a British musical variety troupe also known as the Elliott–Savonas

== Sports ==
- Savona FBC, Italian football club located in Savona
- RN Savona, Italian aquatic sports club located in Savona

== Other uses ==
- Schistura savona, a species of ray-finned fish
- Sevona, a Lake Superior shipwreck off the coast of Wisconsin, United States
- SS Città di Savona, ships with the name
- 12th Artillery Regiment "Savona", a unit of the Italian Army
- 16th Infantry Regiment "Savona", a unit of the Italian Army
- 55th Infantry Division Savona, a division of the Royal Italian Army
