= Fort Jefferson (disambiguation) =

Fort Jefferson is a former coastal fortress in Florida.

Fort Jefferson may also refer to:

- Fort Jefferson (Ohio), a historic fort
- Fort Jefferson, Ohio, an unincorporated community
- Fort Jefferson (Kentucky), a historic site

== See also ==
- Dry Tortugas National Park, formerly Fort Jefferson National Monument, Florida
