= Palm Sunday tornado outbreak =

The phrase Palm Sunday tornado outbreak may refer to any of the following historical tornado outbreaks within the continental United States:

- 1920 Palm Sunday tornado outbreak, the earliest of the Palm Sunday outbreaks
- 1965 Palm Sunday tornado outbreak, the most famous and violent of the Palm Sunday outbreaks
- 1994 Palm Sunday tornado outbreak, the most recent of the Palm Sunday outbreaks
- While not commonly referred to as a "Palm Sunday tornado outbreak", the 1936 Tupelo-Gainesville tornado outbreak also occurred on Palm Sunday
