= Liberty Township, Darke County, Ohio =

Township in Ohio, US

- Township
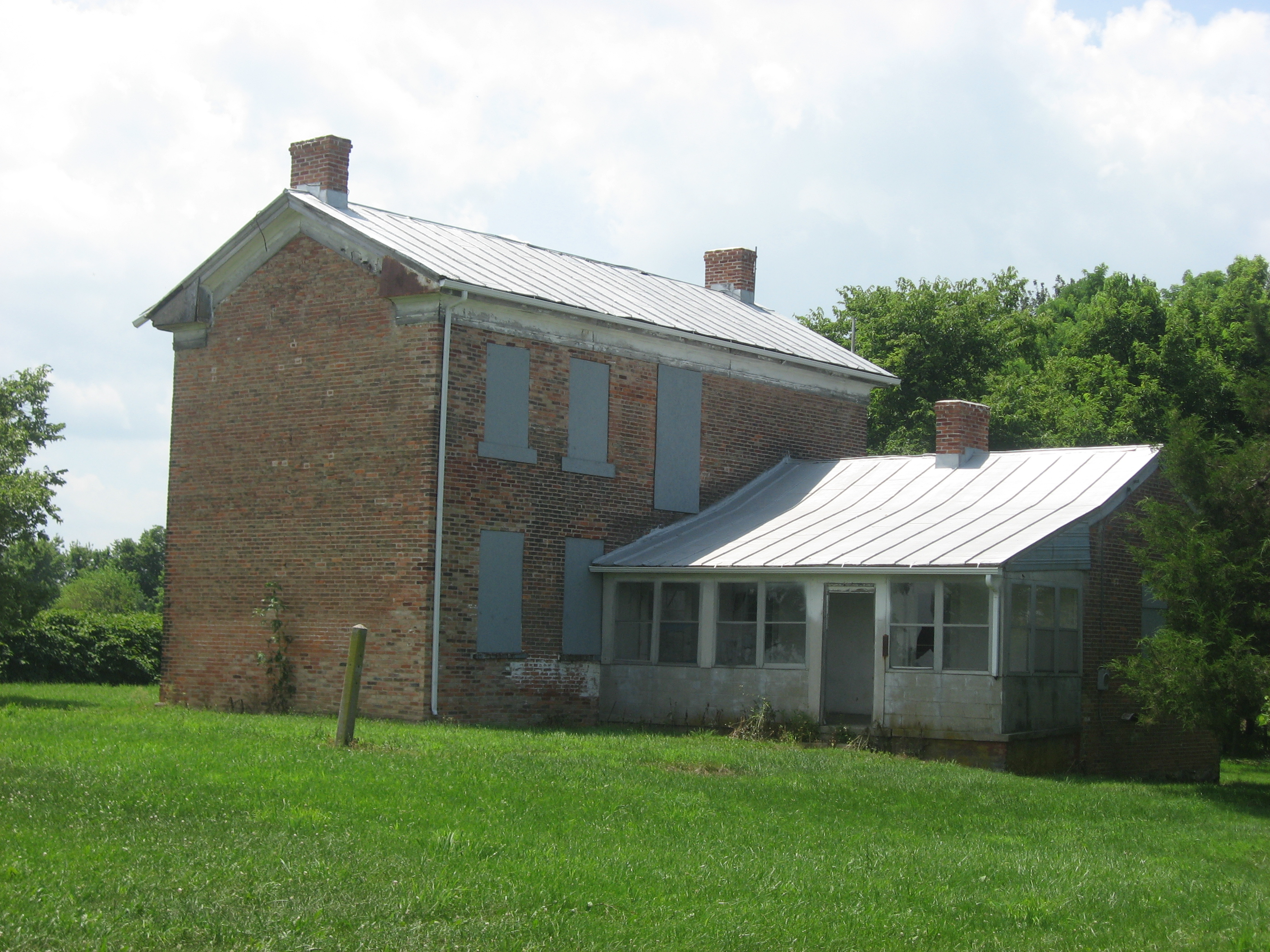
- The Clemens Farmhouse, a historic site in the township

- Location in Darke County and the state of Ohio
- Coordinates: 40°3′20″N 84°45′26″W
- Country: United States
- State: Ohio
- County: Darke

Area
  - Total: 33.3 sq mi (86.2 km^{2})
  - Land: 33.2 sq mi (86.0 km^{2})
  - Water: 0.077 sq mi (0.2 km^{2})
- Elevation: 1,161 ft (354 m)

Population (2020)
  - Total: 986
  - Density: 29.7/sq mi (11.5/km^{2})
- Time zone: UTC-5 (Eastern (EST))
  - Summer (DST): UTC-4 (EDT)
- FIPS code: 39-43092
- GNIS feature ID: 1086017

Liberty Township is one of the twenty townships of Darke County, Ohio, United States. The 2020 census found 986 people in the township.

== Geography ==
Located in the southwestern part of the county, it borders the following townships:

- Washington Township - north
- Greenville Township - northeast
- Neave Township - east
- Butler Township - southeast corner
- Harrison Township - south
- Franklin Township, Wayne County, Indiana - southwest
- Greensfork Township, Randolph County, Indiana - west

The village of Palestine is located in central Liberty Township.

== Name and history ==
One of twenty-five Liberty Townships statewide, it was originally named German Township, but its name was changed to Liberty Township in the 1910s. The effort to rename German Township to Liberty Township in Darke County was reported in The Greenville Journal on April 4, 1918. The newspaper noted that anti-German sentiment during World War I led a lodge in Palestine in the township to launch a petition that was rapidly gaining signatures, demanding the Darke County commissioners change the name from "German Township" to "Liberty Township".

German Township was formed from parts of Harrison and Washington counties in December, 1820. The first settler within its bounds was James Cloyd, who arrived six years before the township's organization. The first school in the township was established near Palestine in 1820, while the first church (a Lutheran congregation) was built in 1826.

The northern boundary of the township was originally defined "by a line 40 rods north of the Whitewater road, and following the turns thereof". The road was later standardized into the county's highway grid system and named Greenville-Nashville Road, because it connects Greenville, Ohio and Nashville, Indiana – each a county seat. In June 1827 the area of the township was reduced when the northern boundary was moved south to just include all of civil township T. 11 N. Range 1 E., as it does today. The northern boundary is now on the straight right-of-way of Greenville-Nashville Road west of US-30 and extends eastward on a survey line to the northern line of Dininger Cemetery at New Madison - Coletown Road (County Road 26). From December 1833 until December 1834, the northern tier of sections (1 through 6) was within Washington Township.was probably because previous to the township's formation the tier had been within Washington Township Brief, short-lived jurisdictional modification were typical of early 19th-century county commissioners adjusting township borders for local administrative convenience, tax assessments, or surveying alignments before quickly reversing the order; the boundary change were probably because previous to the township's formation the tier had been within Washington Township.

One of German Township's most distinctive features was Tampico, an African-American settlement founded in section 17 in 1822 and platted in 1850. Located in the west-northwestern part of the township, its earliest residents were freeborn African Americans from Rockingham County, Virginia who moved to Ohio after the county evicted all freeborn African Americans. In 1914, Tampico and the surrounding rural areas supported four schools and two churches.

== Government ==
The township is governed by a three-member board of trustees, who are elected in November of odd-numbered years to a four-year term beginning on the following January 1. Two are elected in the year after the presidential election and one is elected in the year before it. There is also an elected township fiscal officer, who serves a four-year term beginning on April 1 of the year after the election, which is held in November of the year before the presidential election. Vacancies in the fiscal officership or on the board of trustees are filled by the remaining trustees.
