= Mitchaw, Ohio =

Unincorporated community in Lucas County, Ohio

Coordinates: 41°42′07″N 83°45′44″W

Mitchaw is an unincorporated community in Lucas County, in the U.S. state of Ohio.

== History ==
A post office called Mitchaw was established in 1883, and remained in operation until 1901. Mitchaw was severely damaged in the 1920 Palm Sunday tornado outbreak.
