= Pikeville =

Pikeville may refer to:

== Places in the United States ==
- Pikeville, Jackson County, Alabama, an unincorporated community
- Pikeville, Marion County, Alabama, a ghost town
- Pikeville, Indiana, an unincorporated community
- Pikeville, Kentucky, a home rule-class city and county seat
- Pikeville, North Carolina, a town
- Pikeville, Ohio, an unincorporated community
- Pikeville, Pennsylvania, an unincorporated community
- Pikeville, Tennessee, a city and county seat

== Other uses ==
- University of Pikeville, Pikeville, Kentucky, a private university affiliated with the Presbyterian Church
  - Pikeville Bears, the athletics teams of the university
- Pikeville High School, Pikeville, Kentucky
- Pikeville Cubs, a former minor league baseball team based in Pikeville, Kentucky
- Pikeville station, Pikeville, Kentucky, a railroad station

== See also ==
- Pikesville, Maryland, United States, a census-designated place
  - Pikesville High School
