= KVES =

KVES may refer to:

- KVES-LD, a low-power television station (channel 36) licensed to serve Palm Springs, California, United States
- Darke County Airport (ICAO code KVES)
