= Yankeetown =

Yankeetown is the name of several populated places.

== United States ==
- Yankeetown, Florida
- Yankeetown, Indiana
- Yankeetown, Minnesota
- Yankeetown, Brown County, Ohio
- Yankeetown, Darke County, Ohio
- Yankeetown, Fayette County, Ohio
- Yankeetown, Ross County, Ohio
- Yankeetown, Tuscarawas County, Ohio
- Yankeetown, Tennessee
- Yankeetown, Virginia
- Yankeetown, Wisconsin

== Canada ==
- Yankeetown, Nova Scotia
