= Yankeetown, Ohio =

Yankeetown is the name of 5 different populated places within the state of Ohio.

- Yankeetown, Brown County, Ohio
- Yankeetown, Darke County, Ohio
- Yankeetown, Fayette County, Ohio
- Yankeetown, Ross County, Ohio
- Yankeetown, Tuscarawas County, Ohio
