= Richland Township, Darke County, Ohio =

Township in Ohio, US

- Township
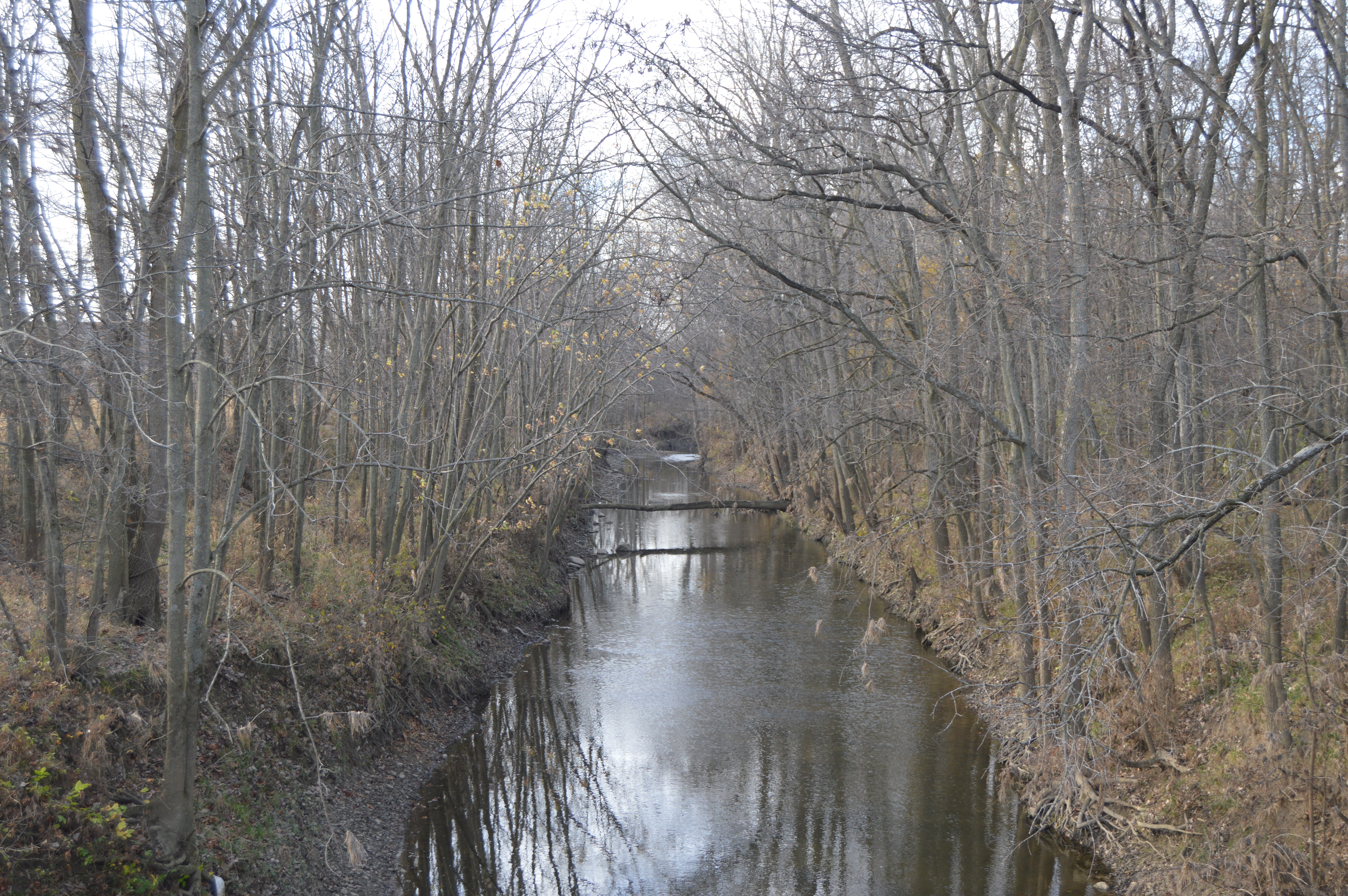
- The Stillwater River in the township's far northwest

- Location in Darke County and the state of Ohio
- Coordinates: 40°11′44″N 84°34′4″W
- Country: United States
- State: Ohio
- County: Darke

Area
  - Total: 21.2 sq mi (54.9 km^{2})
  - Land: 21.2 sq mi (54.8 km^{2})
  - Water: 0.039 sq mi (0.1 km^{2})
- Elevation: 978 ft (298 m)

Population (2020)
  - Total: 820
  - Density: 39/sq mi (15/km^{2})
- Time zone: UTC-5 (Eastern (EST))
  - Summer (DST): UTC-4 (EDT)
- FIPS code: 39-66656
- GNIS feature ID: 1086022

Richland Township is one of the twenty townships of Darke County, Ohio, United States. The 2020 census found 820 people in the township.

== Geography ==
Located in the central part of the county, it borders the following townships:

- York Township - north
- Wayne Township - northeast
- Adams Township - southeast
- Greenville Township - southwest
- Brown Township - northwest

No municipalities are located in Richland Township, although several unincorporated communities lie there:

- Beamsville, in the center, near the Stillwater River
- Dawn, in the north
- Stelvideo, in the south adjacent to the border with Adams Township

== Name and history ==
Richland Township was established in 1820. Richland was noted for its fertile soil. It is one of twelve Richland Townships statewide.

== Government ==
The township is governed by a three-member board of trustees, who are elected in November of odd-numbered years to a four-year term beginning on the following January 1. Two are elected in the year after the presidential election and one is elected in the year before it. There is also an elected township fiscal officer, who serves a four-year term beginning on April 1 of the year after the election, which is held in November of the year before the presidential election. Vacancies in the fiscal officership or on the board of trustees are filled by the remaining trustees.
