= Rose Hill, Ohio =

Unincorporated community in Ohio, U.S.

Coordinates: 40°18′31″N 84°43′32″W

Rose Hill is an unincorporated community in Darke County, in the U.S. state of Ohio.

== History ==
The first settlement at Rose Hill was made in the 1830s. Rose Hill was laid out in 1852. A post office called Rose Hill was established in 1863, and remained in operation until 1904.
