= Stelvideo, Ohio =

- Unincorporated community
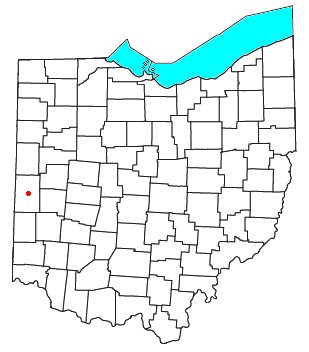
- Location of Stelvideo, Ohio
- Coordinates: 40°09′07″N 84°33′04″W
- Country: United States
- State: Ohio
- County: Darke
- Township: Richland
- Elevation: 1,017 ft (310 m)
- Time zone: UTC-5 (Eastern (EST))
  - Summer (DST): UTC-4 (EDT)
- GNIS feature ID: 1065381

Stelvideo is an unincorporated community on the southern boundary of Richland Township, Darke County, Ohio, United States, at the intersection of Horatio-Harris Creek Road and Arcanum-Bears Mills Road.

== History ==
Stelvideo was laid out in 1851. The Columbus, Piqua & Indiana Railroad (a Pennsylvania Railroad predecessor) opened a line through the town in 1859, running between Columbus and Union City. A post office called Stelvideo was established in 1860, which remained in operation until 1914.
