= Abbottsville, Ohio =

Unincorporated community in Ohio, U.S.

Coordinates: 40°2′15″N 84°34′41″W

Abbottsville is an unincorporated community in Darke County, in the U.S. state of Ohio.

== History ==
A post office called Abbottsville was established in 1848, and remained in operation until 1854. The community was named for one proprietor named Mr. Abbott. The Abbottsville Cemetery is located there.
