= Hollansburg, Ohio =

- Village
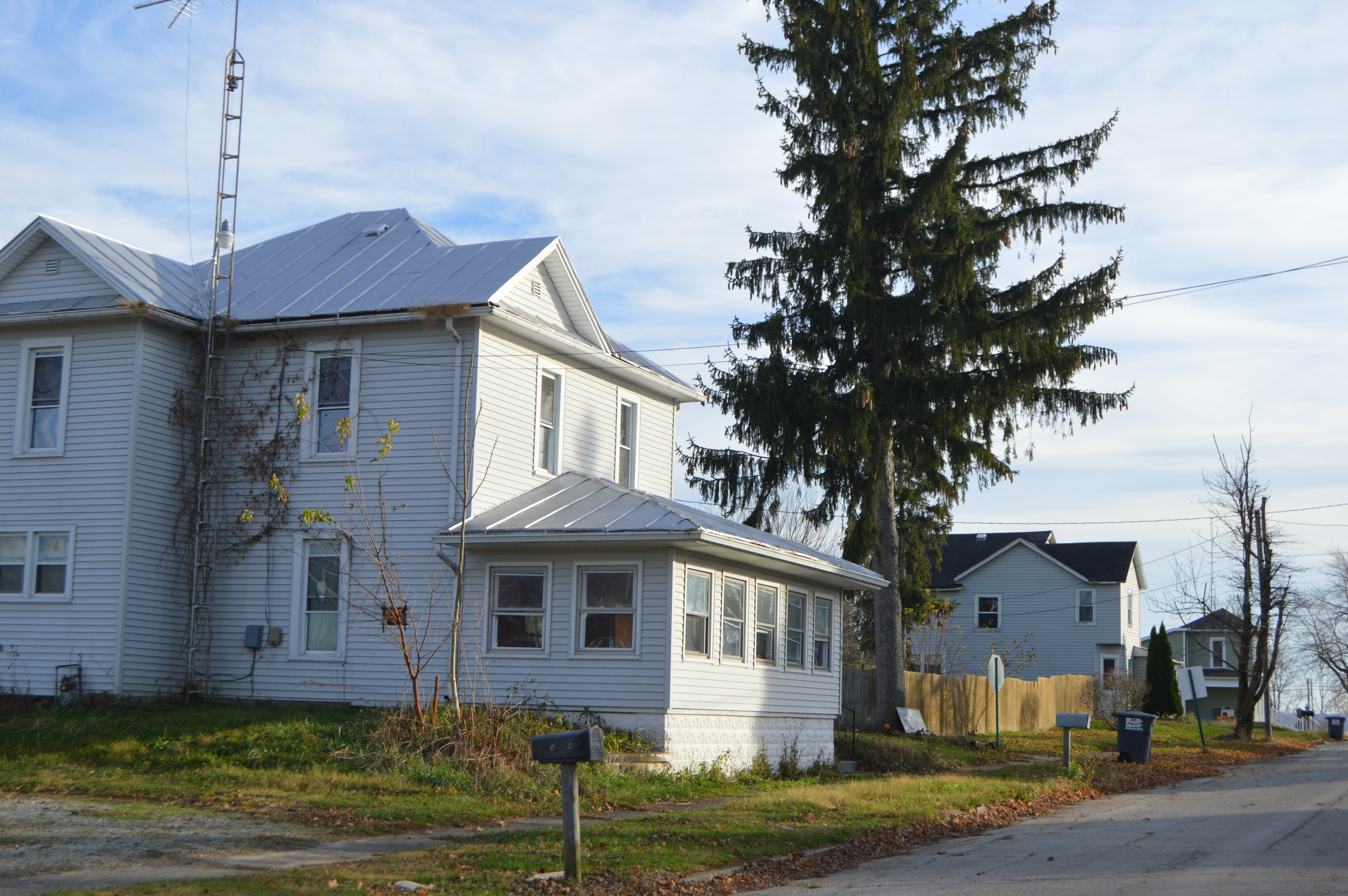
- Houses on Elm Street

- Location in Darke County and the state of Ohio.
- Coordinates: 39°59′58″N 84°47′33″W
- Country: United States
- State: Ohio
- County: Darke
- Township: Harrison

Area
  - Total: 0.12 sq mi (0.31 km^{2})
  - Land: 0.12 sq mi (0.31 km^{2})
  - Water: 0 sq mi (0.00 km^{2})
- Elevation: 1,165 ft (355 m)

Population (2020)
  - Total: 243
  - Density: 2,010/sq mi (775.9/km^{2})
- Time zone: UTC-5 (Eastern (EST))
  - Summer (DST): UTC-4 (EDT)
- ZIP code: 45332
- Area codes: 937, 326
- FIPS code: 39-35896
- GNIS feature ID: 2398525

Hollansburg is a village in Darke County, Ohio, United States. The population was 243 at the 2020 census.

== History ==
On March 28, 1838, local landowner James Stewart platted a community in northwestern Harrison Township and named it "Union." When William Hollaman, another landowner, attempted to purchase lots in the settlement, a dispute erupted between the two men; seven months later, Hollaman attempted to avenge himself by platting another community only 1 mile (1.6 km) to the northeast of Union, to which a third landowner, Valentine Harland, quickly made additions. The new community was given the name of "Hollansburg" as a portmanteau of the owners' names — Hollaman and Harland. Within a year, a countryside post office named "Republican" was moved to Hollansburg, and the village quickly began to outgrow Union; the two communities ultimately merged. The first church in the village, a Church of Christ, was founded in 1840, while the first school building was erected in 1848.

== Geography ==
According to the United States Census Bureau, the village has a total area of 0.12 square miles (0.31 km^{2}), all land.

== Demographics ==
Historical population
Census	Pop.	Note	%±
1870	239		—
1880	245		2.5%
1900	275		—
1910	287		4.4%
1920	262		−8.7%
1930	261		−0.4%
1940	280		7.3%
1950	295		5.4%
1960	311		5.4%
1970	364		17.0%
1980	339		−6.9%
1990	300		−11.5%
2000	214		−28.7%
2010	227		6.1%
2020	243		7.0%
U.S. Decennial Census

In 1950 Hollansburg had 295 residents.

=== 2010 census ===
As of the census of 2010, there were 227 people, 98 households, and 66 families living in the village. The population density was 1,891.7 inhabitants per square mile (730.4/km^{2}). There were 117 housing units at an average density of 975.0 per square mile (376.4/km^{2}). The racial makeup of the village was 93.8% White, 0.4% African American, 0.4% Pacific Islander, 1.8% from other races, and 3.5% from two or more races. Hispanic or Latino of any race were 1.3% of the population.

There were 98 households, of which 31.6% had children under the age of 18 living with them, 51.0% were married couples living together, 9.2% had a female householder with no husband present, 7.1% had a male householder with no wife present, and 32.7% were non-families. 28.6% of all households were made up of individuals, and 14.3% had someone living alone who was 65 years of age or older. The average household size was 2.32 and the average family size was 2.82.

The median age in the village was 40.3 years. 26.4% of residents were under the age of 18; 4.3% were between the ages of 18 and 24; 24.7% were from 25 to 44; 28.2% were from 45 to 64; and 16.3% were 65 years of age or older. The gender makeup of the village was 53.7% male and 46.3% female.

=== 2000 census ===
As of the census of 2000, there were 214 people, 86 households, and 62 families living in the village. The population density was 1,758.9 inhabitants per square mile (679.1/km^{2}). There were 96 housing units at an average density of 789.0 per square mile (304.6/km^{2}). The racial makeup of the village was 98.13% White, and 1.87% from two or more races.

There were 86 households, out of which 32.6% had children under the age of 18 living with them, 53.5% were married couples living together, 10.5% had a female householder with no husband present, and 27.9% were non-families. 26.7% of all households were made up of individuals, and 11.6% had someone living alone who was 65 years of age or older. The average household size was 2.49 and the average family size was 2.98.

In the village, the population was spread out, with 25.7% under the age of 18, 12.1% from 18 to 24, 27.1% from 25 to 44, 21.0% from 45 to 64, and 14.0% who were 65 years of age or older. The median age was 32 years. For every 100 females there were 125.3 males. For every 100 females age 18 and over, there were 106.5 males.

The median income for a household in the village was $33,750, and the median income for a family was $36,111. Males had a median income of $28,125 versus $19,063 for females. The per capita income for the village was $13,317. About 3.1% of families and 4.3% of the population were below the poverty line, including none of those under the age of eighteen and 9.1% of those 65 or over.

== Notable residents ==
- John R. Commons, institutional economist at the University of Wisconsin–Madison.
- Rich Mullins, singer and songwriter
