= Beamsville, Ohio =

Unincorporated community in central Richland Township

- Unincorporated community
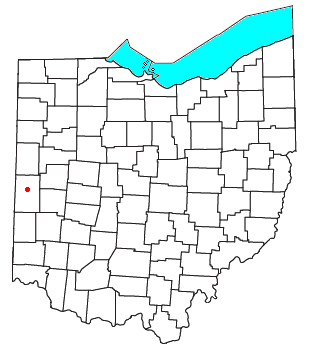
- Location of Beamsville, Ohio
- Coordinates: 40°11′14″N 84°35′08″W
- Country: United States
- State: Ohio
- County: Darke
- Unincorporated community ship: Richland
- Elevation: 1,004 ft (306 m)
- Time zone: UTC-5 (Eastern (EST))
  - Summer (DST): UTC-4 (EDT)
- GNIS feature ID: 1048496

Beamsville in an unincorporated community in central Richland Township, Darke County, Ohio, United States. It lies near the intersection of U.S. Route 127 and the Stillwater River, approximately 6 miles north of Greenville, the county seat of Darke County.

== History ==
Beamsville was laid out in 1837 by John Beam, and named for him. A post office was established at Beamsville in 1839, and remained in operation until 1905.
