= Palestine, Ohio =

- Village
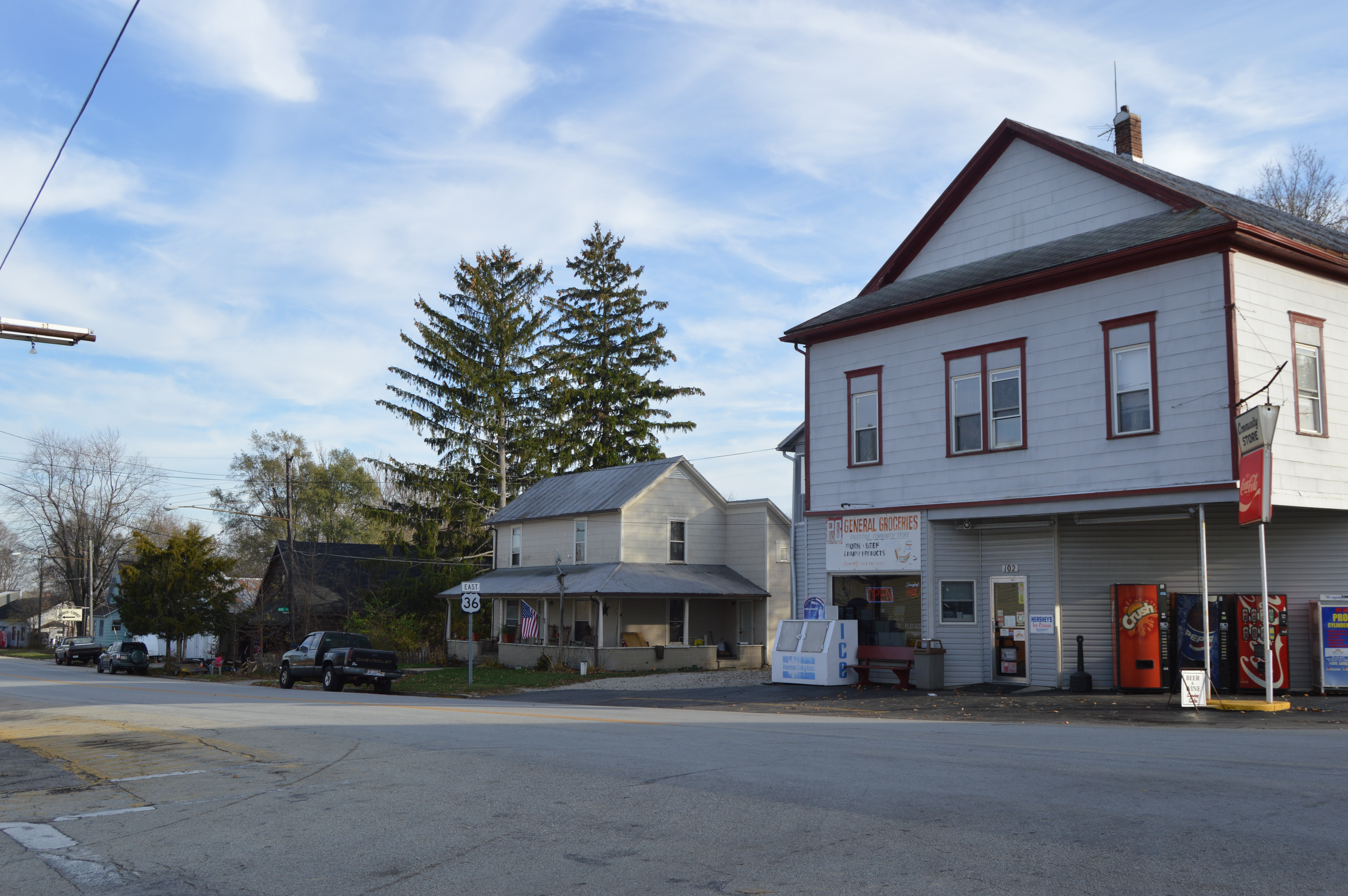
- Cross Street

- Location in Darke County and the state of Ohio.
- Coordinates: 40°03′01″N 84°44′50″W
- Country: United States
- State: Ohio
- County: Darke
- Township: Liberty

Area
  - Total: 0.15 sq mi (0.38 km^{2})
  - Land: 0.15 sq mi (0.38 km^{2})
  - Water: 0 sq mi (0.00 km^{2})
- Elevation: 1,109 ft (338 m)

Population (2020)
  - Total: 180
  - Density: 1,232.1/sq mi (475.71/km^{2})
- Time zone: UTC-5 (Eastern (EST))
  - Summer (DST): UTC-4 (EDT)
- ZIP code: 45352
- Area codes: 937, 326
- FIPS code: 39-59598
- GNIS feature ID: 2399609

Palestine is a village in Darke County, Ohio, United States. The population was 180 at the 2020 census.

== History ==
Palestine was platted by Samuel Loring in 1833. It has always been a small community, although its population declined during the twentieth century; the 1910 census recorded 216 residents.

== Geography ==
According to the United States Census Bureau, the village has a total area of 0.15 square miles (0.39 km^{2}), all land.

== Demographics ==
Historical population
Census	Pop.	Note	%±
1870	264		—
1880	264		0.0%
1900	210		—
1910	216		2.9%
1920	199		−7.9%
1930	176		−11.6%
1940	200		13.6%
1950	207		3.5%
1960	257		24.2%
1970	246		−4.3%
1980	213		−13.4%
1990	197		−7.5%
2000	170		−13.7%
2010	200		17.6%
2020	180		−10.0%
U.S. Decennial Census

=== 2010 census ===
As of the census of 2010, there were 200 people, 79 households, and 54 families living in the village. The population density was 1,333.3 inhabitants per square mile (514.8/km^{2}). There were 89 housing units at an average density of 593.3 per square mile (229.1/km^{2}). The racial makeup of the village was 93.5% White, 5.0% African American, and 1.5% from two or more races.

There were 79 households, of which 34.2% had children under the age of 18 living with them, 48.1% were married couples living together, 15.2% had a female householder with no husband present, 5.1% had a male householder with no wife present, and 31.6% were non-families. 29.1% of all households were made up of individuals, and 8.9% had someone living alone who was 65 years of age or older. The average household size was 2.53 and the average family size was 3.07.

The median age in the village was 33.5 years. 30% of residents were under the age of 18; 7.5% were between the ages of 18 and 24; 23.5% were from 25 to 44; 23% were from 45 to 64; and 16% were 65 years of age or older. The gender makeup of the village was 50.0% male and 50.0% female.

=== 2000 census ===
As of the census of 2000, there were 170 people, 57 households, and 45 families living in the village. The population density was 1,152.9 inhabitants per square mile (445.1/km^{2}). There were 73 housing units at an average density of 495.1 per square mile (191.2/km^{2}). The racial makeup of the village was 94.71% White and 5.29% African American.

There were 57 households, out of which 50.9% had children under the age of 18 living with them, 57.9% were married couples living together, 5.3% had a female householder with no husband present, and 19.3% were non-families. 14.0% of all households were made up of individuals, and 7.0% had someone living alone who was 65 years of age or older. The average household size was 2.98 and the average family size was 3.26.

In the village, the population was spread out, with 31.2% under the age of 18, 8.8% from 18 to 24, 34.7% from 25 to 44, 8.8% from 45 to 64, and 16.5% who were 65 years of age or older. The median age was 37 years. For every 100 females there were 97.7 males. For every 100 females age 18 and over, there were 105.3 males.

The median income for a household in the village was $26,250, and the median income for a family was $36,250. Males had a median income of $0 versus $0 for females. The per capita income for the village was $17,983. None of the population or families were below the poverty line.
