= Willowdell, Ohio =

Unincorporated community in Ohio, U.S.

Coordinates: 40°18′23″N 84°27′14″W

Willowdell is an unincorporated community in Darke County, in the U.S. state of Ohio. Home of the Willowdell Wienerfest; a nonprofit festival to benefit Special Olympics.

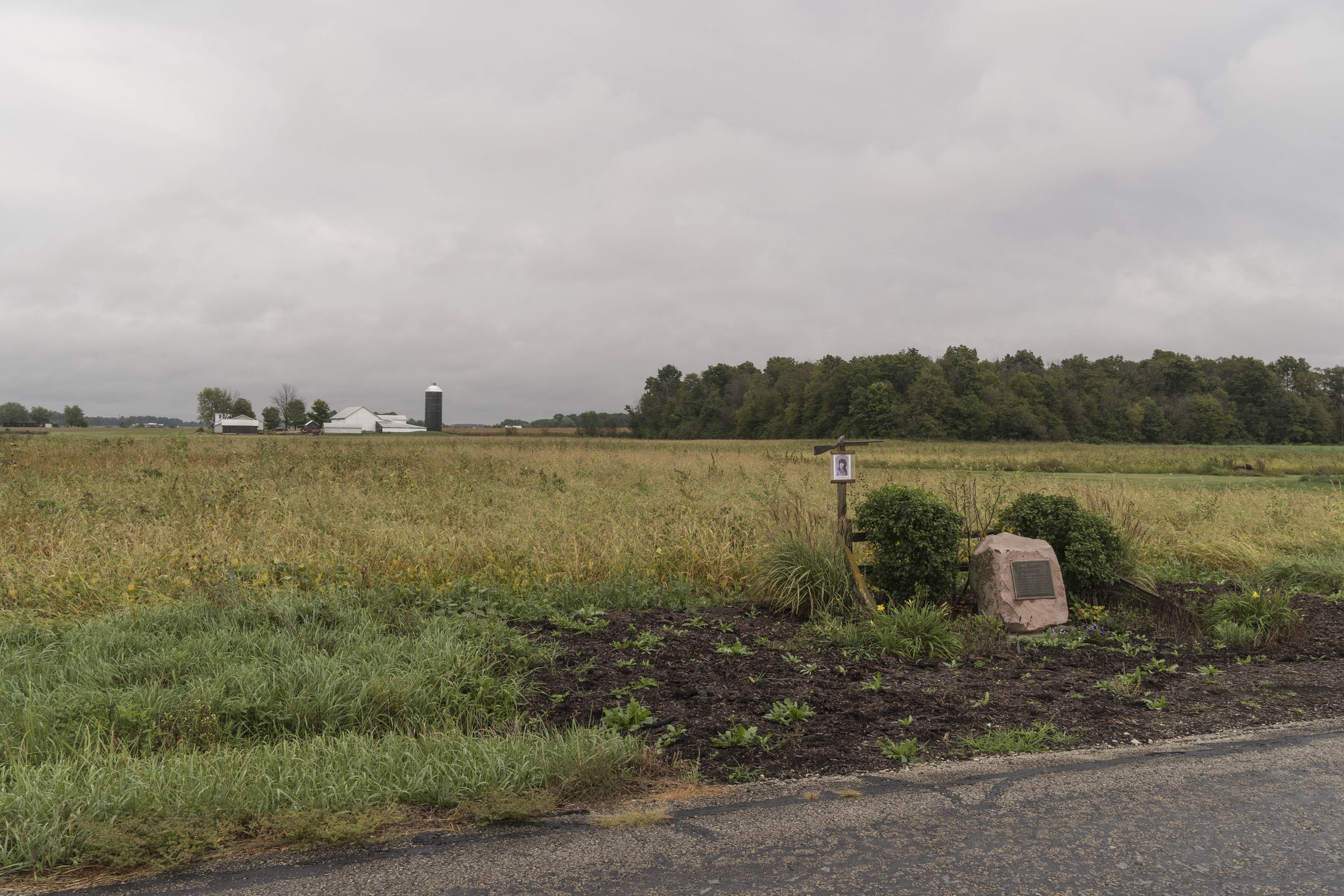
Annie Oakley Marker in Willowdell, Ohio

== History ==
Willowdell was originally called Woodland, and under the latter name was laid out in 1859. A post office called Woodland was established in 1857, and closed in 1867. This post office reopened in 1879 under the new name of Willowdell, and remained in operation until it was discontinued in 1905.

== Notable person ==
- Annie Oakley, sharpshooter of the American Old West
