= Weavers, Ohio =

Unincorporated community in Ohio, U.S.

Coordinates: 40°01′35″N 84°40′42″W

Weavers is an unincorporated community in Darke County, in the U.S. state of Ohio.

== History ==
A former variant name of Weavers was Weavers Station. The community was named for Peter Weaver, the original owner of the town site. A post office called Weavers Station was established in 1868, and remained in operation until 1914. Besides the post office, Weavers Station contained a railroad station, grain elevator, and country store.
