= Richfield Township, Ohio =

Richfield Township, Ohio may refer to:

- Richfield Township, Henry County, Ohio
- Richfield Township, Lucas County, Ohio
- Richfield Township, Summit County, Ohio

== See also ==
- Richland Township, Ohio (disambiguation)
