= Painter Creek, Ohio =

Unincorporated community in Ohio, U.S.

- Unincorporated community
- Interactive map of Painter Creek, Ohio
- Coordinates: 40°02′08″N 84°28′10″W
- Country: United States
- State: Ohio
- County: Darke
- Time zone: UTC−5 (EST)
  - Summer (DST): UTC−4 (EDT)

Painter Creek is an unincorporated community in Darke County, in the U.S. state of Ohio.

== History ==
Painter Creek was platted in 1870. The community took its name from nearby Painter Creek. A post office called Painter Creek was established in 1852, and remained in operation until 1903. Besides the post office, Painter Creek had a tile factory, schoolhouse, and town hall.
