= Nashville, Darke County, Ohio =

Unincorporated community in Ohio, U.S.

Coordinates: 40°05′31″N 84°44′40″W

Nashville is an unincorporated community in Darke County, in the U.S. state of Ohio.

== History ==
A former variant name of Nashville was Darke. A post office called Darke was established in 1849, and remained in operation until 1903. Nashville also had a church and a country store.
