= Horatio, Ohio =

Unincorporated community in Ohio, U.S.

Coordinates: 40°08′58″N 84°31′30″W

Horatio is an unincorporated community in Darke County, in the U.S. state of Ohio.

== History ==
A post office called Horatio was established in 1860, and remained in operation until 1920. Besides the post office, Horatio had a church and a country store.
