= Dawn, Ohio =

- Unincorporated community
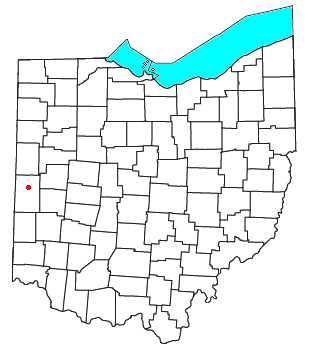
- Location of Dawn, Ohio
- Coordinates: 40°13′01″N 84°34′44″W
- Country: United States
- State: Ohio
- County: Darke
- Unincorporated community ship: Richland
- Elevation: 1,014 ft (309 m)
- Time zone: UTC-5 (Eastern (EST))
  - Summer (DST): UTC-4 (EDT)
- GNIS feature ID: 1064512

Dawn is an unincorporated community in northern Richland Township, Darke County, Ohio, United States. It lies at the intersection of U.S. Route 127 with Burch Road. It is located between the villages of Ansonia and Versailles, approximately 8 miles (12.75 km) north of Greenville, the county seat of Darke County.

== History ==
Dawn was originally called Nevada, and under the latter name had its start in 1854 when a sawmill was built there. A post office called Dawn was established in 1857, and remained in operation until 1935.
