= 1920 Palm Sunday tornado outbreak =

Windstorms in the Midwest and Southern United States

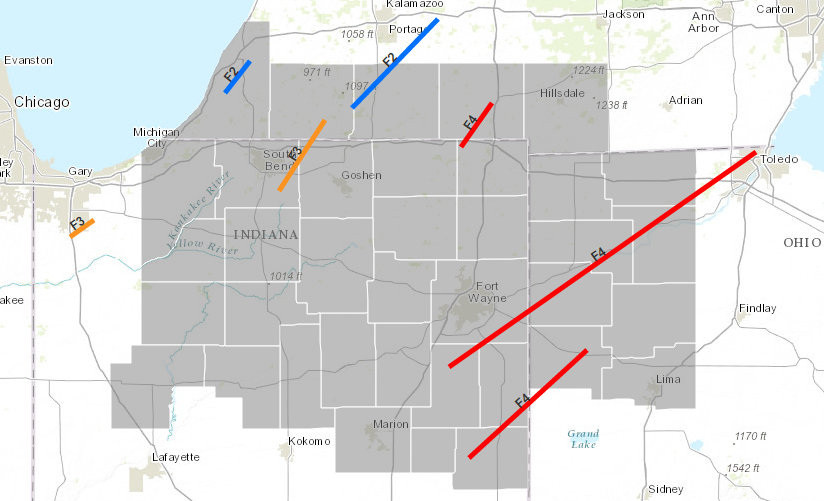
- Paths of tornadoes over Northern Indiana and Southern Michigan

Meteorological history
- Duration: March 28, 1920

Tornado outbreak
- Tornadoes: ≥ 37
- Max. rating: F4 tornado
- Duration: ~9 hours

Overall effects
- Casualties: ≥ 153 fatalities, ≥ 1,215 injuries
- Damage: Unknown (Note: All losses are in 1920 USD unless otherwise noted.)
- Areas affected: Midwestern and Southern United States

On March 28, 1920, a large outbreak of at least 37 tornadoes, 31 of which were significant, took place across the Midwestern and Southern United States. The tornadoes left at least 153 dead and at least 1,215 injured. Many communities and farmers alike were caught off-guard as the storms moved to the northeast at speeds that reached over 60 mph (97 km/h). Most of the fatalities occurred in Georgia (37), Ohio (28), and Indiana (21), while the other states had lesser totals. Little is known about many of the specific tornadoes that occurred, and the list below is only partial. (Note: The Fujita scale was devised under the aegis of scientist T. Theodore Fujita in the early 1970s. Prior to the advent of the scale in 1971, tornadoes in the United States were officially unrated. While the Fujita scale has been superseded by the Enhanced Fujita scale in the U.S. since February 1, 2007, Canada utilized the old scale until April 1, 2013; nations elsewhere, like the United Kingdom, apply other classifications such as the TORRO scale.) (Note: Historically, the number of tornadoes globally and in the United States was and is likely underrepresented: research by Grazulis on annual tornado activity suggests that, as of 2001, only 53% of yearly U.S. tornadoes were officially recorded. Documentation of tornadoes outside the United States was historically less exhaustive, owing to the lack of monitors in many nations and, in some cases, to internal political controls on public information. Most countries only recorded tornadoes that produced severe damage or loss of life. Significant low biases in U.S. tornado counts likely occurred through the early 1990s, when advanced NEXRAD was first installed and the National Weather Service began comprehensively verifying tornado occurrences.)

Severe thunderstorms began developing in Missouri during the early morning hours. The storms moved quickly to the northeast towards Chicago, Illinois. The first tornado injured five people 35 mi (56 km) southeast of Springfield, Missouri, in Douglas County. This first tornado was a harbinger of things to come as the morning went on and the atmosphere began to destabilize, due to the abundance of sunshine that preceded the cold front in the warm sector, which covered the lower Great Lakes region extending southward well past the Ohio River Valley.

== Background ==
According to meteorologist and weather historian Charles Merlin Umpenhour, climatic conditions were favorable on Palm Sunday 1920 for all the atmospheric ingredients to come together needed to create the classic setup needed for long-track tornadoes. However, forecasting, communications technology, and public awareness about Severe Weather was nearly nonexistent in 1920 and would not begin for another 33 years, when the U.S. Weather Bureau would implement its public Watch (the word ‘forecast’ was used until 1966) and Warning program in 1953.

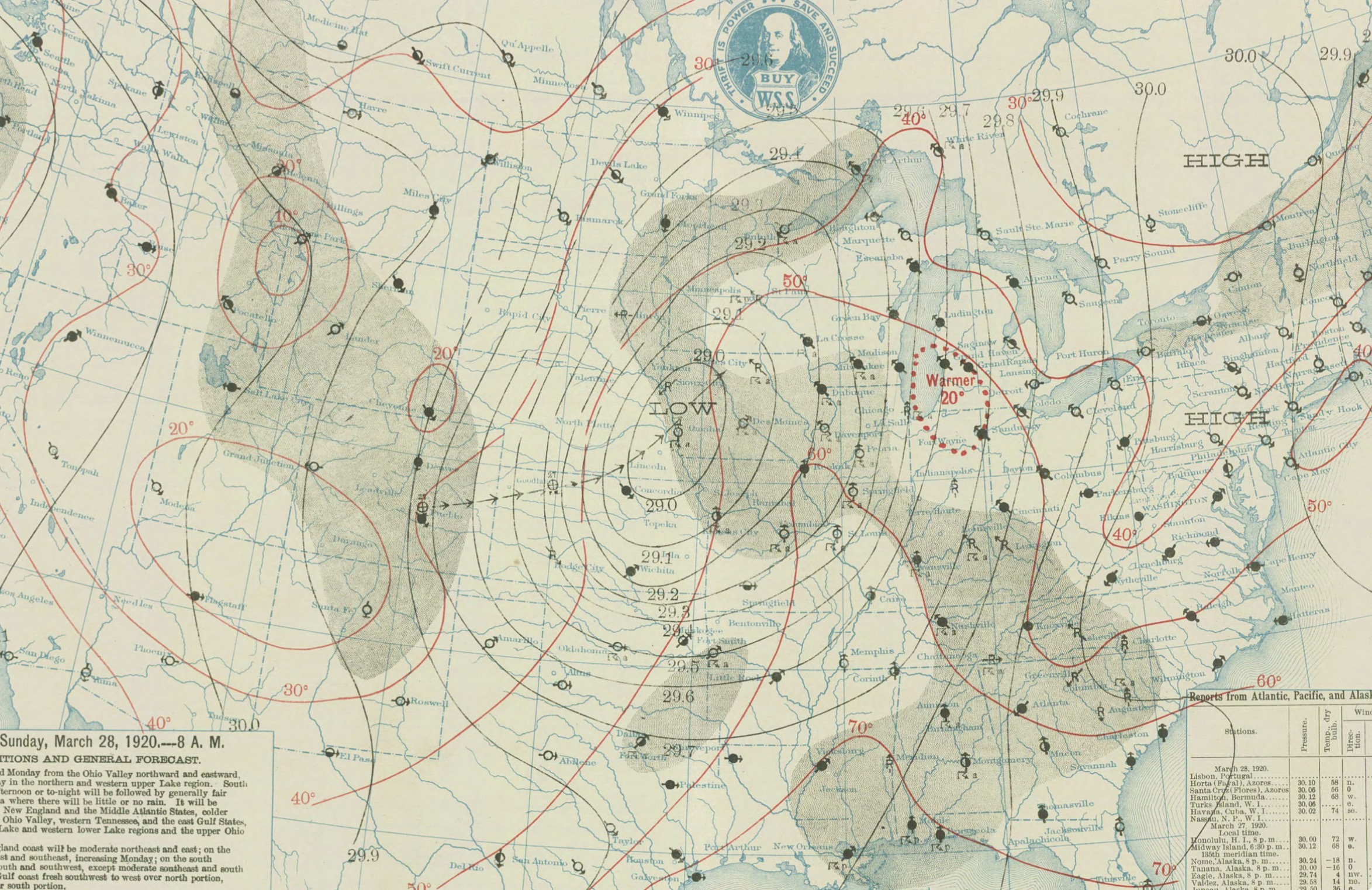
Surface weather analysis on March 28, showing the Low-pressure area that produced the tornado outbreak

For the residents of the Great Lakes region and Ohio Valley areas, the only source of weather information was the rather vague forecasts that were issued in the local newspaper the day before or by word of mouth. The use of the word "tornado" was strictly prohibited in public weather forecasting until the 1950s because of the fear and panic it might cause. This policy would come under-fire in the years to come especially after the Tri-State Tornado in 1925 that stands today as the deadliest tornado in American history.

Weather forecasters and the public alike in the Chicago, Dayton, Fort Wayne, Lansing, South Bend, and Toledo areas were unaware that the stage was set that day for a significant tornado outbreak that would follow a balmy and seemingly tranquil Palm Sunday afternoon. The weather maps in use in March 1920 showed a rather large and deep cyclone over northern Iowa that was forecast to move across central Lower Michigan by nightfall with a trailing cold front. Meteorologists knew rain showers and perhaps a thundershower was a good possibility, but were unaware that the helicity, lifted index, and upper level winds were being guided by a strong jet stream with a probable negative-tilt that would create favorable conditions for the development of tornadoes.

On the morning of March 28, a deep low-pressure center positioned itself near Sioux City, Iowa, with a reported pressure of 28.96 inHg (981 mb). Ahead of the low, temperatures over a broad expanse ranged from 20 to 25 °F (−7 to −4 °C) above average, indicating a robust warm sector. Around noon CST (18:00 UTC), temperatures ranged from 60 °F (16 °C) in Chicago, Illinois, to 77 °F (25 °C) in Montgomery, Alabama, with brisk low-level winds ranging from the southeast to south-southeast. These winds allowed a warm, moist air mass to advect northward from the Gulf of Mexico to the Great Lakes. A strong elevated mixed layer (EML) was present over portions of the warm sector. Meanwhile, a pronounced, eastward-shifting convergence zone, characterised by shifting low-level winds, helped promote the development of vigorous thunderstorms. Observations from Springfield, Illinois, and other weather stations, taken in the wake of the convergence zone, indicated anomalously low relative humidity, suggestive of a strong dry line.

== Confirmed tornadoes ==
Confirmed tornadoes by Fujita rating
FU	F0	F1	F2	F3	F4	F5	Total
5	?	?	15	8	8	0	≥ 37

Confirmed tornadoes – March 28, 1920 (Note: All dates are based on the local time zone where the tornado touched down; however, all times are in Coordinated Universal Time and dates are split at midnight CST/CDT for consistency.) (Note: Prior to 1994, only the average widths of tornado paths were officially listed.)
F#	Location	County / Parish	State	Time (UTC)	Path length	Max. width	Summary
F2	Vanzant	Douglas	MO	08:30–?	Unknown	200 yards (180 m)	Tornado struck six rural farmsteads. Frail farmhouses were destroyed. Five people were injured and losses totaled $3,000.
F2	SE of Baroda to E of Sodus	Berrien	MI	17:30–?	10 miles (16 km)	Unknown	Barns were destroyed on five farms. A small home was destroyed as well.
F2	S of Cortland to NE of Sycamore	DeKalb	IL	18:00–?	12 miles (19 km)	100 yards (91 m)	Many silos and barns were destroyed. Losses totaled $25,000.
F3	SE of La Fox to Elgin	Kane	IL	18:05–18:23	20 miles (32 km)	500 yards (460 m)	8 deaths – See section on this tornado
F4	N of Channahon to Wilmette	Will, Cook	IL	18:15–19:15	53 miles (85 km)	100 yards (91 m)	20 deaths – See section on this tornado
F2	E of Elkhorn to W of East Troy	Walworth	WI	18:15–?	6 miles (9.7 km)	400 yards (370 m)	1 death – A tornado destroyed three barns, killing one woman. Losses totaled $25,000.
F2	N of Milner	Pike	GA	19:00–?	2 miles (3.2 km)	Unknown	1 death – A tornado killed a woman as it destroyed a home and a church. Three people were injured and losses totaled $10,000.
F2	Bridgeview to WSW of the Chicago Loop	Cook	IL	19:10–?	10 miles (16 km)	100 yards (91 m)	A tornado struck between Cicero and Chicago Midway Airport. It destroyed eight buildings, including a school, and unroofed many others. Six people were injured and losses totaled $150,000.
F2	W of Hart to Weare	Oceana	MI	20:00–?	10 miles (16 km)	100 yards (91 m)	1 death – A tornado began as a waterspout over Lake Michigan. As it moved onshore, it killed a man and destroyed a barn and a small home. Three people were injured. The tornado may have continued many more miles into Lake and Osceola counties.
F3	W of Jacksonville	Calhoun	AL	20:00–?	8 miles (13 km)	100 yards (91 m)	1 death – A tornado tore apart a small home, killing a boy near Cedar Springs. It also leveled barns and trees southwest of that community. Ten people were injured.
F3	S of Mishawaka, IN to NW of Union, MI	St. Joseph (IN), Elkhart (IN), Cass (MI)	IN, MI	20:15–?	22 miles (35 km)	200 yards (180 m)	A tornado caused damage to twelve farms and destroyed a home northwest of Elkhart, Indiana. It then destroyed four more farm buildings in Michigan. Eight people were injured.
F2	N of Deatsville	Elmore	AL	20:30–?	Unknown	100 yards (91 m)	A tornado destroyed barns and small homes. Five people were injured. This tornado was related to the following event.
F4	NE of Eclectic, AL to West Point, GA	Elmore (AL), Tallapoosa (AL), Chambers (AL), Troup (GA)	AL, GA	20:45–21:37	50 miles (80 km)	400 yards (370 m)	26 deaths – See section on this tornado
F2	Corey Lake to S of Climax	St. Joseph, Kalamazoo	MI	21:00–?	30 miles (48 km)	50 yards (46 m)	Likely a tornado family, this event destroyed barns, killed cattle, and unroofed a few homes as it skipped along.
F2	SW of Kalamazoo	Kalamazoo	MI	21:00–?	Unknown	Unknown	A tornado destroyed barns near Kalamazoo before dissipating and reforming in Barry County as an F4 tornado.
F3	W of Leroy to Beatrice	Lake, Porter	IN	21:00–?	7 miles (11 km)	100 yards (91 m)	1 death – This tornado destroyed two homes and damaged five, killing a man in his home. One person was injured.
F4	NE of Orland, IN to SW of Coldwater, MI	Steuben (IN), Branch (MI)	IN, MI	21:30–?	13 miles (21 km)	200 yards (180 m)	2 deaths – One farmhouse was swept off its partially dislodged foundation. Other homes and businesses were unroofed as well. Five people were injured and losses totaled $150,000. Another deadly F4 tornado affected the same area in 1965.
F3	S of Mulliken to St. Johns	Eaton, Clinton, Gratiot, Saginaw	MI	21:30–?	50 miles (80 km)	150 yards (140 m)	1 death – Likely tornado family destroyed farm buildings north of Wacousta and later continued to do so as it passed east of Mulliken and northeast of Eureka. Caused possible F4 damage to farms southwest of St. Johns and produced F2-level damage in the business district of that town. In downtown St. Johns, the tornado smashed glass windows, tore off roofs, and destroyed walls, causing $250,000 in damage. The tornado was 300 yd (900 ft) wide as it passed through St. Johns. Only one person was injured.
F4	S of Hickory Corners to Vermontville	Barry, Eaton	MI	21:30–?	20 miles (32 km)	400 yards (370 m)	4 deaths – A violent tornado destroyed 35 farms in its path and killed people in farmhouses in the vicinity of Maple Grove. It also carried part of a furnace 12 mi (19 km) distant. 25 people were injured.
F3	S of Orangeville to ENE of Hastings	Barry	MI	21:30–?	15 miles (24 km)	200 yards (180 m)	1 death – A tornado immediately destroyed a home as it touched down. Later, it went on to destroy nearly 15 farms. It was a very intense event, possibly an F4 tornado, and may have begun at Alamo in Kalamazoo County. Five people were injured.
F4	Uniondale, IN to SW of Sylvania, OH	Wells (IN), Allen (IN), Paulding (OH), Defiance (OH), Henry (OH), Fulton (OH), Lucas (OH)	IN, OH	22:15–?	100 miles (160 km)	800 yards (730 m)	23 deaths – See section on this tornado
F3	SE of LaGrange	Troup	GA	22:45–?	5 miles (8.0 km)	800 yards (730 m)	27 deaths – Powerful tornado struck southeastern section of LaGrange. Destroyed 75 poorly built homes near a mill and a factory. Tornado also damaged railcars and spilled and ruined much fertilizer in the area, then went on to destroy both the mill and the factory. Caused 27 deaths, 100 injuries, and $1 million in losses in LaGrange alone, becoming the deadliest tornado of the entire outbreak. Some accounts suggested up to 200 "dead and injured" across Troup County. Tornado may have reached F4 intensity.
F4	SW of West Liberty, IN to S of Van Wert, OH	Jay (IN), Adams (IN), Mercer (OH), Van Wert (OH)	IN, OH	23:00–?	40 miles (64 km)	800 yards (730 m)	17 deaths – See section on this tornado
FU	W of Cornland to N of Lincoln	Logan	IL	23:00–23:30	20 miles (32 km)	Unknown	A tornado passed through the Broadwell area. It damaged farmhouses and buildings and caused significant damage to trees and power lines.
F4	NNE of Fenton	Genesee, Oakland	MI	23:30–?	10 miles (16 km)	200 yards (180 m)	4 deaths – See section on this tornado
F2	S of Perry to NE of Morrice	Shiawassee	MI	23:40–23:45	7 miles (11 km)	100 yards (91 m)	A tornado destroyed barns and killed farm animals along its short-lived path.
F2	W of Saginaw	Saginaw	MI	00:07–?	2 miles (3.2 km)	50 yards (46 m)	A tornado struck four farms in western Saginaw and destroyed barns.
FU	Grand Lake St. Marys to SW of Lima	Mercer, Auglaize, Allen	OH	00:30–?	Unknown	Unknown	Tornado first appeared as a waterspout over Grand Lake St. Marys. Storm quickly intensified as it moved towards the northeast at 55 mph (89 km/h). Heaviest damage occurred near Moulton, as several farms and homes were destroyed, with only minor injuries reported. Tornado lifted shortly before the city of Lima.
F2	E of Bowling Green to NE of Martin	Wood, Sandusky, Ottawa	OH	00:30–?	>7 miles (11 km)	100 yards (91 m)	2 deaths – One or more tornadoes moved rapidly northeast into Sandusky County. Striking the village of Genoa, the tornado leveled 20–36 homes and several businesses. In the Clay Township area, two people were killed and 20 people were injured, extending to the small town of Trowbridge. Tornado subsequently passed out into Lake Erie.
F3	S of Union City, IN to SE of Lightsville, OH	Randolph (IN), Darke (OH)	IN, OH	00:30–?	15 miles (24 km)	200 yards (180 m)	5 deaths – A tornado destroyed six farms in Ohio. 10 people were injured.
F4	W of Fountain City, IN to N of Greenville, OH	Wayne (IN), Randolph (IN), Darke (OH)	IN, OH	01:00–?	20 miles (32 km)	400 yards (370 m)	8 deaths – The final violent tornado of the outbreak destroyed eight homes near Fountain City before causing F4 damage to farms in Ohio. Its worst effects were observed 2 mi (3.2 km) northwest of Greenville. 40 people were injured and losses totaled $1 million.
FU	NE of Elgin	Kane	IL	Unknown	Unknown	Unknown	Tornado extensively damaged outbuildings on farms. Was part of the Elgin tornado family.
FU	W of Barrington	Lake	IL	Unknown	Unknown	Unknown	Tornado extensively damaged outbuildings on farms. Was part of the Elgin tornado family.
FU	Wauconda	Lake	IL	Unknown	Unknown	Unknown	Tornado destroyed buildings and killed cattle. Was part of the Elgin tornado family.
F2	SE of Lansing	Ingham	MI	Unknown	Unknown	Unknown	A home was reported destroyed near Mason. One person was injured.
F2	S of Free Soil	Mason	MI	Unknown	7 miles (11 km)	150 yards (140 m)	This tornado destroyed a barn and unroofed one home as it briefly touched down.

=== La Fox–Elgin, Illinois ===
La Fox–Elgin, Illinois
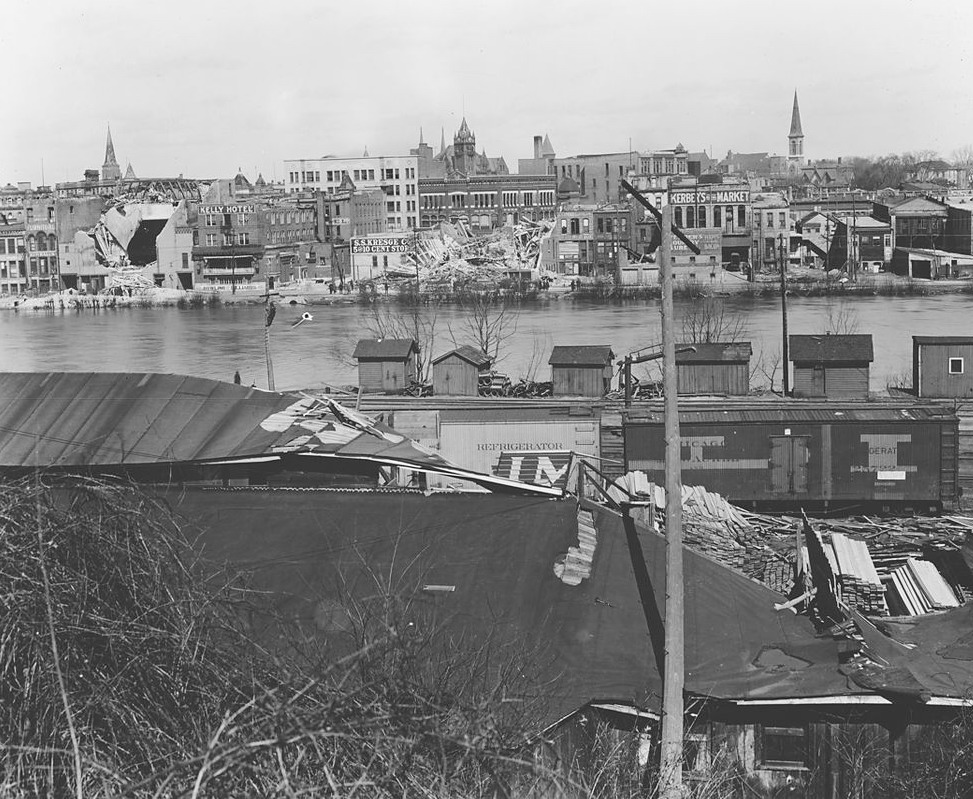
- Tornado damage along the Fox River in Elgin

Meteorological history
- Date: March 28, 1920

F3 tornado
- on the Fujita scale
- Highest winds: 200 mph (320 km/h)

Overall effects
- Fatalities: 8
- Injuries: 100
- Damage: $1,000 (1920 USD) $20,000 (2025 USD)

Just before the noon hour, severe thunderstorms began forming 50 mi (80 km) west of downtown Chicago. The first storm started to spawn killer tornadoes in DeKalb and then Kane counties, starting at 1:05 p.m. CDT. Upon touching down, the tornadoes then moved northeast at about 50 miles per hour (80 km/h). The tornado in Kane County apparently first formed about 1 1/2 mi (2.4 km) southeast of La Fox and moved northeast, later passing directly through downtown Elgin. Initially, the tornado destroyed a farmhouse and numerous barns, killing a father and tossing about a baby as it touched down.

Observers occasionally reported a well-defined funnel along the path as the tornado continued into the business district of Elgin, destroying or damaging many structures. It destroyed six businesses, damaged many others, and also "partially wrecked" three churches. Three people died as the rear of a theater collapsed, three more as a brick church tower fell, and one additional as a building façade caved in. Church services had been dismissed just minutes before, saving the lives of parishioners and preventing more deaths in Elgin.

As the tornado left downtown Elgin, it destroyed numerous trees along with 25 homes and damaged 200 other residences. Thereafter, the tornado destroyed two more barns and killed 38 cattle. It then probably dissipated, only to develop into a new tornado. Both isolated tornado and widespread downburst damage was reported as far as Wauconda, killing cattle, damaging farms, and destroying many buildings. The tornado in Elgin was rated F3 in a study and was the first tornado of the outbreak to cause deaths and to kill more than five people.

=== Channahon–Troy Township–Lockport–Bellwood–Maywood–Melrose Park–Dunning, Illinois ===
Channahon–Troy Township–Lockport–Bellwood–Maywood–Melrose Park–Dunning, Illinois
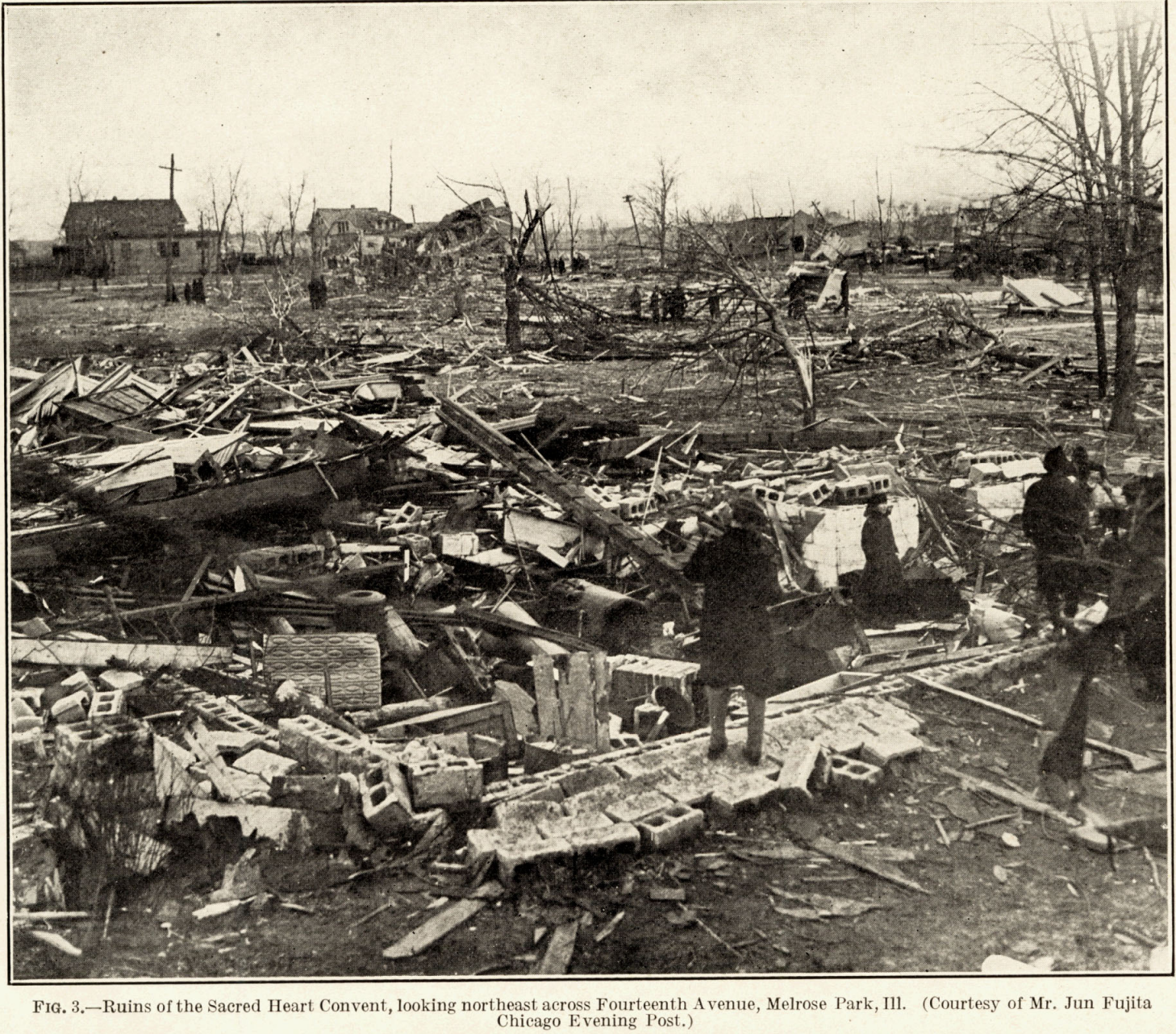
- Ruins of the Sacred Heart Convent in Melrose Park, Illinois, following the F4 tornado of March 28, 1920

Meteorological history
- Date: March 28, 1920

F4 tornado
- on the Fujita scale
- Highest winds: 207–260 mph (333–418 km/h)

Overall effects
- Casualties: 20 fatalities, 300 injuries
- Damage: $2,000,000 (1920 USD) $32.1 million (2025 USD)

Roughly 15 minutes after the Elgin tornado formed, a deadly and violent F4 tornado tore through Will and Cook Counties, producing a path 53 mi (85 km) long in the Bellwood and Maywood areas. The tornado first destroyed five homes, two frame schools, and at least 12 barns as it passed from Channahon to Troy and thence to Lockport. It skipped thereafter, possibly dissipating and redeveloping into a second tornado, as it caused minor damage in the Romeoville area. Afterward, the tornado funnel was not seen for some time.

Upon reaching the Bellwood-Maywood area, a second tornado probably touched down and produced a continuous damage swath to Lake Michigan, killing 20 people and leveling many homes with F4 damage. 10 of the deaths alone occurred at Melrose Park when the tornado hit Sacred Heart Catholic Church and Convent as people were getting ready for Palm Sunday services. The tornado destroyed 50 other buildings in Melrose Park before moving over less populated areas, killing six more people in the community of Dunning before passing over Lake Michigan. In all, the tornado partially or completely destroyed 413 buildings and injured about 300 people.

=== Red Hill–Susanna–Red Ridge–Agricola, Alabama/West Point, Georgia ===
Red Hill–Susanna–Red Ridge–Agricola, Alabama/West Point, Georgia
Meteorological history
- Date: March 28, 1920

F4 tornado
- on the Fujita scale
- Highest winds: 230 mph (370 km/h)

Overall effects
- Casualties: 26 fatalities, 125 injuries
- Damage: $450,000 (1920 USD) $7.23 million (2025 USD)

This tornado first developed east of Eclectic between 4:00–4:45 p.m. CDT, but most likely around 3:45 p.m. CDT according to Thomas P. Grazulis. Some damage occurred to homes, trees, outhouses, and a school before the tornado hit Red Hill. Next, the tornado caused at least 17 deaths and destroyed 60 homes in Alabama, mainly near Susanna, Red Ridge, and Agricola. Afterward, it caused nine deaths and 40 injuries in an industrial and business swath of West Point, Georgia, with 40 homes destroyed in Georgia. It became the second-deadliest tornado to hit this day.

=== Ossian–Townley, Indiana/Brunersburg–Raab Corners, Ohio ===
Ossian–Townley, Indiana/Brunersburg–Raab Corners, Ohio
Meteorological history
- Date: March 28, 1920

F4 tornado
- on the Fujita scale
- Highest winds: 220 mph (350 km/h)

Overall effects
- Casualties: 23 fatalities, 54 injuries
- Damage: >$1,000,000 (1920 USD) >$16.1 million (2025 USD)

The tornadoes that struck the western counties of Darke, Defiance, Mercer, Paulding, and Van Wert in Ohio on March 28, 1920, originated in the Hoosier State, quickly moving across the state line into Ohio.

The first of the tornadoes began in Indiana around 6:15 p.m. EDT. Probably part of a tornado family, it touched down near the Wells County community of Ossian. Increasing rapidly in size and intensity, the tornado was reported by eyewitnesses to have resembled a very large, low-hanging mass of turbulent clouds that resembled boiling pot of oatmeal. This may have accounted for the deaths and injuries of so many farmers within its path, since many farmers were usually accustomed to taking shelter during dangerous weather situations. The tornado caused nine deaths on farms outside Ossian. The tornado then destroyed nearly every building at Townley. Four people died there as the entire town was devastated. The powerful tornado subsequently hit Edgerton before entering Ohio. In Indiana the tornado destroyed numerous farms, leveled at least 100 buildings, killed 13 people, and left behind $1,000,000 in damage (1920 USD) in the state. It later became the first of three tornadoes to move into Ohio, this time from Allen County, Indiana.

After moving through Paulding County, the tornado alternately lifted and dipped to the ground, possibly even reforming as a separate tornado, as it moved into the Defiance area. Here several homes and a small store were destroyed and six people lost their lives. The violent tornado then moved northeast into Henry and Fulton Counties, tearing through the town of Swanton, located near Brunersburg, and causing major damage. Many factories, shops, and homes were completely demolished. According to the Toledo Blade newspaper, the central business district sustained very heavy damage along Main Street, extending into nearby residential areas, where the damage became more intense. This damage brought out many thieves who looted local businesses and houses that had been hit by the tornado. Continuing on, the tornado then caused isolated damage to farms and trees as it passed into rural areas.

Increasing in size as it moved into northwest Lucas County, the tornado produced increasingly severe damage, as buildings and homes were swept clean of their foundations, before leveling the entire community of Raab Corners, also called "Rab's Corners" or "Rabb's Corner", in Lucas County. Farmhouses and other buildings were leveled as the violent tornado, 1/2 mi (0.80 km) wide at this point, moved towards Raab Corners. The residents of Raab Corners were largely unaware of the impending danger as they celebrated Palm Sunday services at the Immaculate Conception and St. Mary's Churches that evening. Just after 8:00 p.m. EDT rain and small hail started to come down in torrents. As the power went out churchgoers lighted kerosene lamps to illuminate the interior of their buildings, and to continue their Palm Sunday services, when the winds began to increase followed by large hail that shattered all the windows. Around 8:15 p.m. EDT, a solid black wall of swirling clouds proceeded to engulf Raab Corners, destroying everything in its path and killing four people. Local residents decided not to rebuild the town, moving to nearby communities in Michigan and Ohio. Today, only an intersection remains at what once was the main four corners.

=== West Liberty–Geneva–Ceylon, Indiana/Van Wert, Ohio ===
West Liberty–Geneva–Ceylon, Indiana/Van Wert, Ohio
Meteorological history
- Date: March 28, 1920

F4 tornado
- on the Fujita scale
- Highest winds: 207–260 mph (333–418 km/h)

Overall effects
- Casualties: 17 fatalities, 70 injuries

This tornado developed in east-central Indiana and crossed into Mercer and Van Wert counties in Ohio. Upon touching down in Indiana, the tornado severely impacted West Liberty, Indiana (seven deaths), located north-northwest of Portland, before leveling homes between Geneva and Ceylon. In this area, the tornado partially stripped chickens of their feathers—a common phenomenon known as moulting—and many buildings were swept away with their floors slightly dislodged. Thereafter, it leveled farms and killed three people in neighboring Ohio. In this area, the tornado was very intense and may have even reached F5 intensity, being one of the strongest tornadoes recorded this day. After exiting Adams County, Indiana, this large tornado moved towards the far northwestern part of Mercer County in west-central Ohio, again destroying nearly everything in its path. As the tornado moved on into Van Wert County, three more people died and many would be injured as the storm moved to the south of Van Wert. Some of this same area was hit by another F4 tornado on November 10, 2002.

=== Fenton, Michigan ===
Fenton, Michigan
Meteorological history
- Date: March 28, 1920

F4 tornado
- on the Fujita scale
- Highest winds: 225 mph (362 km/h)

Overall effects
- Casualties: 4 fatalities, 11 injuries
- Damage: $200,000 (1920 USD) $3.21 million (2025 USD)

The third and final F4 tornado in Michigan this day touched down west-northwest of Fenton at about 7:30 p.m. EDT, shortly before "8 o' clock," though one estimate suggested a time of 6:00 p.m. EDT. The tornado first destroyed a barn, a farmhouse, and a school as it moved northeast. It then struck a cement plant and demolished a smokestack and destroyed the steel-framed kiln room, reportedly warping and twisting the steel bars "so badly...that it is probable that the enclosure will have to be rebuilt." Total losses reached $100,000 at the plant. Afterward, the intensifying tornado leveled farm buildings and killed two horses and several other livestock; it left cows unharmed but pinned under debris. The F4 tornado then struck and completely leveled about 30 lakeside summer homes, many of them large and well-built structures worth $3,000–$6,000 to build at the time. Intense winds lifted boats up to 300 feet (91 m) from their moorings and carried entire homes several hundred feet from their foundations. In the summer, according to the Fenton Independent, there would have been "hundreds of people camping at the lake. Should the accident have occurred at that time there would have been hundreds of deaths." In all, the powerful tornado killed four people and damaged or destroyed 35 buildings near Fenton. One of the deaths occurred in an overturned car, among the earliest tornado-related deaths in an automobile; the earliest known such death was probably on May 19, 1918, in Iowa.

== See also ==
- List of tornadoes and tornado outbreaks
  - List of North American tornadoes and tornado outbreaks
- 1965 Palm Sunday tornado outbreak – Catastrophic outbreak that affected the same region as the 1920 outbreak
- 1994 Palm Sunday tornado outbreak – Produced deadly, long-lived tornadoes over the Southeastern United States
