= New Harrison, Ohio =

Unincorporated community in Ohio, U.S.

Coordinates: 40°06′44″N 84°31′03″W

New Harrison is an unincorporated community in Darke County, in the U.S. state of Ohio.

== History ==
New Harrison was laid out in 1837. A post office called New Harrison was established in 1852, and remained in operation until 1859. The growth and prosperity of New Harrison was soon hampered by its proximity to Gettysburg.
