= Braffetsville, Ohio =

Unincorporated community in Ohio, U.S.

Coordinates: 39°55′28″N 84°45′42″W

Braffetsville is an unincorporated community in Darke County, in the U.S. state of Ohio.

== History ==
Braffetsville was laid out in 1834. The town site was located on the railroad.
