= Jaysville, Ohio =

- Unincorporated community
- Location within the state of Ohio
- Coordinates: 40°02′53″N 84°35′57″W
- Country: United States
- State: Ohio
- County: Darke
- Elevation: 1,063 ft (324 m)
- Time zone: UTC-5 (Eastern (EST))
  - Summer (DST): UTC-4 (EDT)
- GNIS feature ID: 1048870

Jaysville is a small unincorporated community about one mile southeast of Greenville in Darke County, Ohio, United States. It lies along State Route 49, one mile southeast of the county seat of Greenville and four miles north of Arcanum. The community is on the south side of Route 49 and the Greenville Industrial Park is on the opposite side.

== History ==
A post office called Jaysville was established in 1860, and remained in operation until 1914. The community was named for the local Jay family.
