= Savona (name) =

Savona is an Italian surname derived from the city of Savona, Liguria. It is occasionally used in English as a feminine given name. People with the name include:

== Surname ==
- Ashlee Savona (born 1992), Guyanese-Canadian footballer
- Jessica Savona (born 1994), Canadian artistic gymnast
- Leopoldo Savona (1922–2000), Italian actor, director, choreographer and screenwriter
- Mista Savona, Australian music producer and keyboardist
- Nicolò Savona (born 2003), Italian footballer
- Paolo Savona (born 1936), Italian economist and former minister
- Sigismondo Savona (1835–1908), Maltese educator and politician
- Virgilio Savona (1919–2009), Italian composer and singer
- William Savona (1865–1937), Maltese politician

== Given name ==
- Savona Bailey-McClain, American community organizer and art producer

== See also ==
- Savona (disambiguation)
