= Richland Township, Ohio =

Richland Township, Ohio may refer to:

- Richland Township, Allen County, Ohio
- Richland Township, Belmont County, Ohio
- Richland Township, Clinton County, Ohio
- Richland Township, Darke County, Ohio
- Richland Township, Defiance County, Ohio
- Richland Township, Fairfield County, Ohio
- Richland Township, Guernsey County, Ohio
- Richland Township, Holmes County, Ohio
- Richland Township, Logan County, Ohio
- Richland Township, Marion County, Ohio
- Richland Township, Vinton County, Ohio
- Richland Township, Wyandot County, Ohio

== See also ==
- Richfield Township, Ohio (disambiguation)
