= Coletown, Ohio =

Unincorporated community in Ohio, U.S.

Coordinates: 40°08′04″N 84°42′10″W

Coletown is an unincorporated community in Darke County, in the U.S. state of Ohio.

== History ==
A former variant name of Coletown was Coleville. Coleville was laid out in 1848. The railroad station at Coletown was called Mount Heron. A post office called Mount Heron was established in 1847, and remained in operation until 1914.
