= Delisle, Ohio =

Unincorporated community in Ohio, U.S.

Coordinates: 40°01′10″N 84°34′27″W

Delisle is an unincorporated community in Darke County, in the U.S. state of Ohio.

== History ==
Delisle was platted by Catherine Fairchild in 1850 when the railroad was extended to that point. Delisle also had a schoolhouse until 1951, at which time students began attending schools in nearby Arcanum. A post office was established at Delisle in 1856, and remained in operation until 1993.
