= The Elliott–Savonas =

Promotional postcard, 1909

The Elliott–Savonas were a troupe of British music hall, circus and variety entertainers, between the 1870s and 1920s, who performed two distinct stage acts. As The Cycling Elliotts, they performed cycling tricks; and, as The Musical Savonas, the same individuals formed a saxophone band. They used various combinations of names in their billings, including The Elliotts as the Musical Savonas, and were described as "one of the most successful and original of the early music hall speciality acts".

== History ==
James Bedford Elliott (1846–1906) was born in Stockton-on-Tees, the son of a blacksmith. In the 1860s, he started performing as a solo trick cyclist, as well as taking part successfully in cycle races. He set up his own bicycle shop, making his own machines, and in 1867 married Mary Thompson. When their children became able to cycle, they proved to be adept at performing stunts. In the late 1870s the family began performing together in circuses using a variety of cycles including penny-farthings and unicycles. The main performers were his daughters Kate, Polly, May, and Rose, and sons Tom, Jim, Harry, and Dot, with cousins and other family members joining and leaving at various times. In 1883 they joined P. T. Barnum's circus, and toured the U.S. and Canada after overcoming objections and legal challenges from the newly-formed New York Society for the Prevention of Cruelty to Children.

Touring widely with circuses around Europe and the Americas, the children also became interested in playing saxophones, and eventually acquired a full set, from soprano to bass, which they all learned to play. Initially they integrated the saxophone band with their cycling act, but soon divided their performances into two sections, "The Cycling Elliotts" and "The Musical Savonas". Historian Roy Busby commented: "So individual and accomplished were the two acts that the audiences were slow to realise they were performed by the same troupe, partly because trick-cycling and musical virtuosity rarely go hand in hand."

The name "Savonas" was apparently an in-joke, deriving from the French savon, meaning soap. In their Savonas act, the family dressed in an approximation of 18th-century French court costumes, and billed themselves as "The Only Saxophone Band in the World". Their music focused on classical and standard concert band works by such composers as Mozart, Rossini, and John Philip Sousa, as well as waltzes and polkas, often arranged by J. Ord Hume. They played a wide variety of wind and other instruments, including an organ keyboard and many exotic instruments collected during their world tours, and advertised that they played over 50 instruments in their show. They were also among the first to use electric lighting in their act, using a set fitted with over one thousand light bulbs.

Based in Middlesbrough, they made two world tours, and for some thirty years the "gloriously original if bizarre troupe remained unchallenged as the greatest exponent of the musical variety act." J. B. Elliott died in 1906, and his second wife, Margaret, took over managing the troupe. From 1908, they performed a musical revue, "The Garden of Harmony". Margaret Elliott died from a heart attack during a performance at Darlington in 1913, and was buried in Middlesbrough with her husband. The troupe — augmented by others outside the family — continued to perform around the world, during and after the First World War, and began performing a new production, "The Palace of Orpheus", in 1920. They finally disbanded in 1923.

== Later activities ==
One latter-day member of the troupe, Tommy Varley (1902–1987), married one of J. B. Elliott's granddaughters, Hazel, in 1924. Working as Tommy Elliott, he played the concertina to a high standard, and continued the family name by forming a musical troupe called, initially, "Hazel Elliott and Her Candies". These later became "The Seven Elliotts" and, from the 1930s, "The Musical Elliotts", usually playing concertinas and adding comedy elements and novelty sounds to the act. They performed in various configurations until the 1960s. Tommy Elliott also performed a solo act on the concertina, on one occasion at the specific request of Eva Braun, and often appeared on BBC Radio before retiring in 1980.
