= Fort Jefferson (Ohio) =

- Fort Jefferson Site
- U.S. National Register of Historic Places
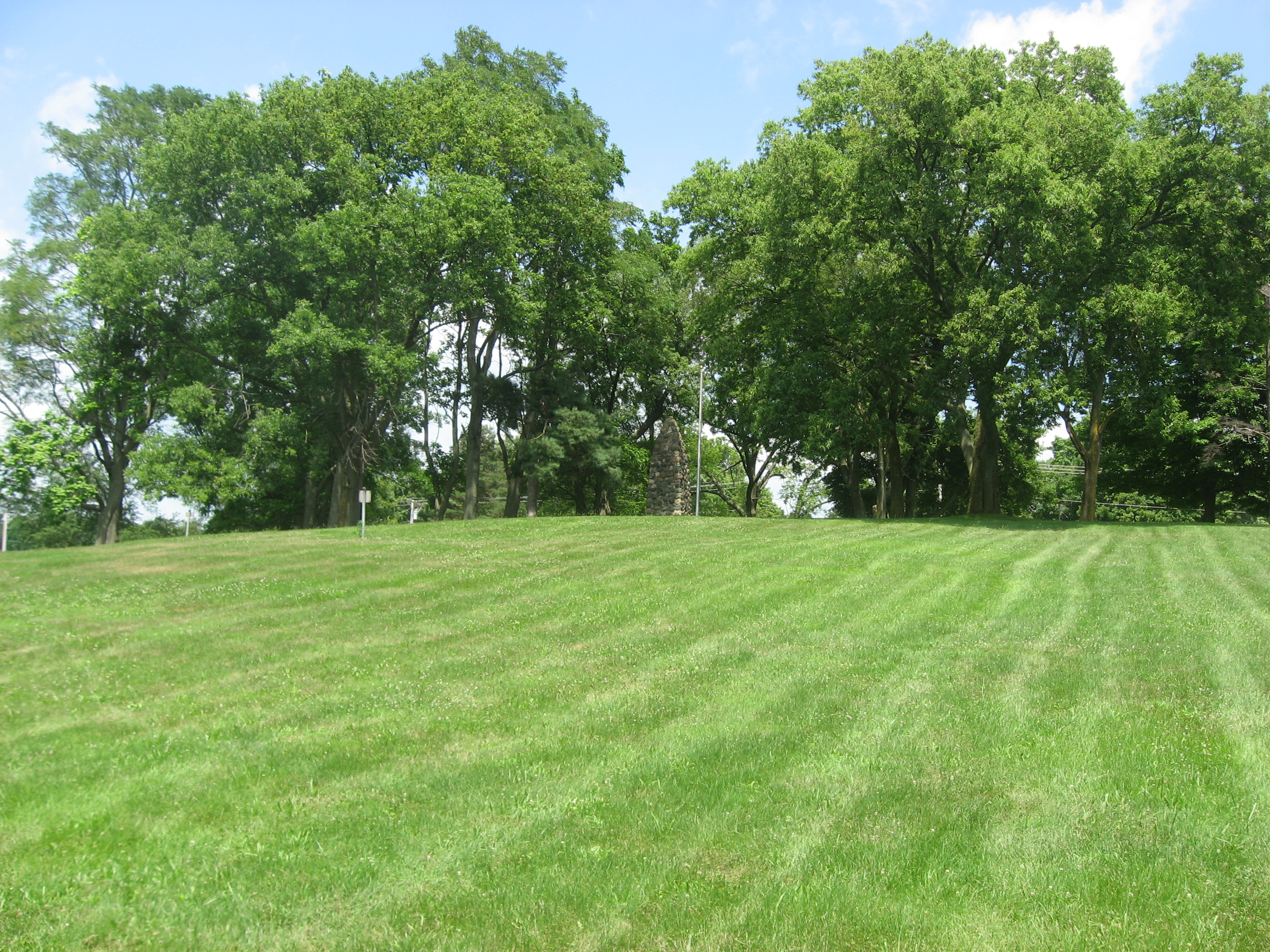
- Southern side of the hill on which the fort sat

- Location within Ohio Location within the United States
- Location: State Route 121 in Neave Township, Darke County, Ohio
- Coordinates: 40°1′32″N 84°39′24″W
- Area: 6.5 acres (2.6 ha)
- Built: 1791
- NRHP reference No.: 70000488
- Added to NRHP: November 10, 1970

Fort Jefferson was a fortification erected by soldiers of the United States Army in October 1791 during the Northwest Indian War. Built to support a military campaign, it saw several years of active fighting. Today, the fort site is a historic site.

== Establishment ==
Located in present-day Darke County in far western Ohio, the fort was built under the direction of General Arthur St. Clair in October 1791 as an advance post for his campaign from Fort Washington against local Native Americans. A square of approximately 100 feet (30 m) on each side, the fort was built of wood and intended primarily as a supply depot; accordingly, it was originally named "Fort Deposit." Before St. Clair's army departed the fort, a court-martial was conducted for an unknown crime; the three soldiers who were convicted and hanged became the first whites to be executed in present-day Darke County.

One month later, after St. Clair's army was badly defeated in battle near modern-day Fort Recovery to the north, the scattered remnants of his force reconstituted at Fort Jefferson. Because it was not intended to house many soldiers, and because few supplies were actually stored at the fort, St. Clair found the fort insufficiently large for his men; consequently, he took most of his surviving soldiers and returned to Fort Washington, leaving only a small garrison to guard his many wounded. It is believed that the garrison was under the command of Captain Joseph Shaylor.

== Siege of Fort Jefferson ==
The defeat of the American army in late 1791 left Fort Jefferson deep in enemy territory. Determined to drive the American soldiers back to the Ohio River, a Native American force (possibly under the command of Simon Girty) raided the fort in the early Summer 1792. This raid began on 25 June 1792, with an attack of one hundred warriors against a party gathering hay for the fort's supplies, and left sixteen soldiers dead or missing. It is possible that another raid was conducted a short while later with the intention of capturing or killing Captain Shaylor. Local histories suggest the attackers exploited Shaylor's love of hunting by imitating wild turkey calls to lure Shaylor and his son into the woods. Captain Shaylor escaped the ensuing pursuit, but his son was killed.

The fort came under siege intermittently for three years, as continued Native American attacks were made to neutralize the outpost.

== Wayne's campaign ==
As the United States Army prepared to return to the offensive in the western Ohio country, Fort Jefferson became more than an isolated location outside of the control of the hostile Miamis: projections were created of using the fort as a base for the protection of local settlers and for raids on nearby Native Americans. When Anthony Wayne and his Legion of the United States, fresh from Legionville, began their expedition to avenge St. Clair in the fall of 1793, they erected a new supply fort at the site of Greenville, 5 miles (8.0 km) north of Fort Jefferson. Nevertheless, they relied heavily on the supplies of Fort Jefferson in their campaign during the following year.

== After the war ==
After the end of the war, white settlers began to take up residence in the vicinity of the abandoned fort. A blockhouse was built by one nearby resident in 1810; by 1820, more settlers had built houses, a mill, and a school near the fort site. The settlement developed into Fort Jefferson, Ohio.

In the fall of 1907, the Greenville Historical Society dedicated a memorial on the site of the fort. Fort Jefferson was further recognized in 1970 when it was added to the National Register of Historic Places. The area designated as historic encompasses approximately 6.5 acres (2.6 ha).
