= Lightsville, Ohio =

Unincorporated community in Ohio, U.S.

Coordinates: 40°17′07″N 84°42′46″W

Lightsville is an unincorporated community in Darke County, in the U.S. state of Ohio.

== History ==
Lightsville was platted in 1874 by William B. Light and named for him. A post office called Lightsville was established in 1886, and remained in operation until 1907.
