= Tampico, Ohio =

Unincorporated community in Ohio, U.S.

Coordinates: 40°02′55″N 84°47′35″W

Tampico is an unincorporated community in Darke County, in the U.S. state of Ohio.

== History ==
Tampico was laid out in 1850 in Section 17, German Township (Township 11 North, Range 1 East) – renamed Liberty Township about 1918. A post office called Tampico was established in 1850, and remained in operation until 1876. Tampico was originally built up exclusively by African Americans.
