= Darke County, Ohio =

County in Ohio, United States

- County
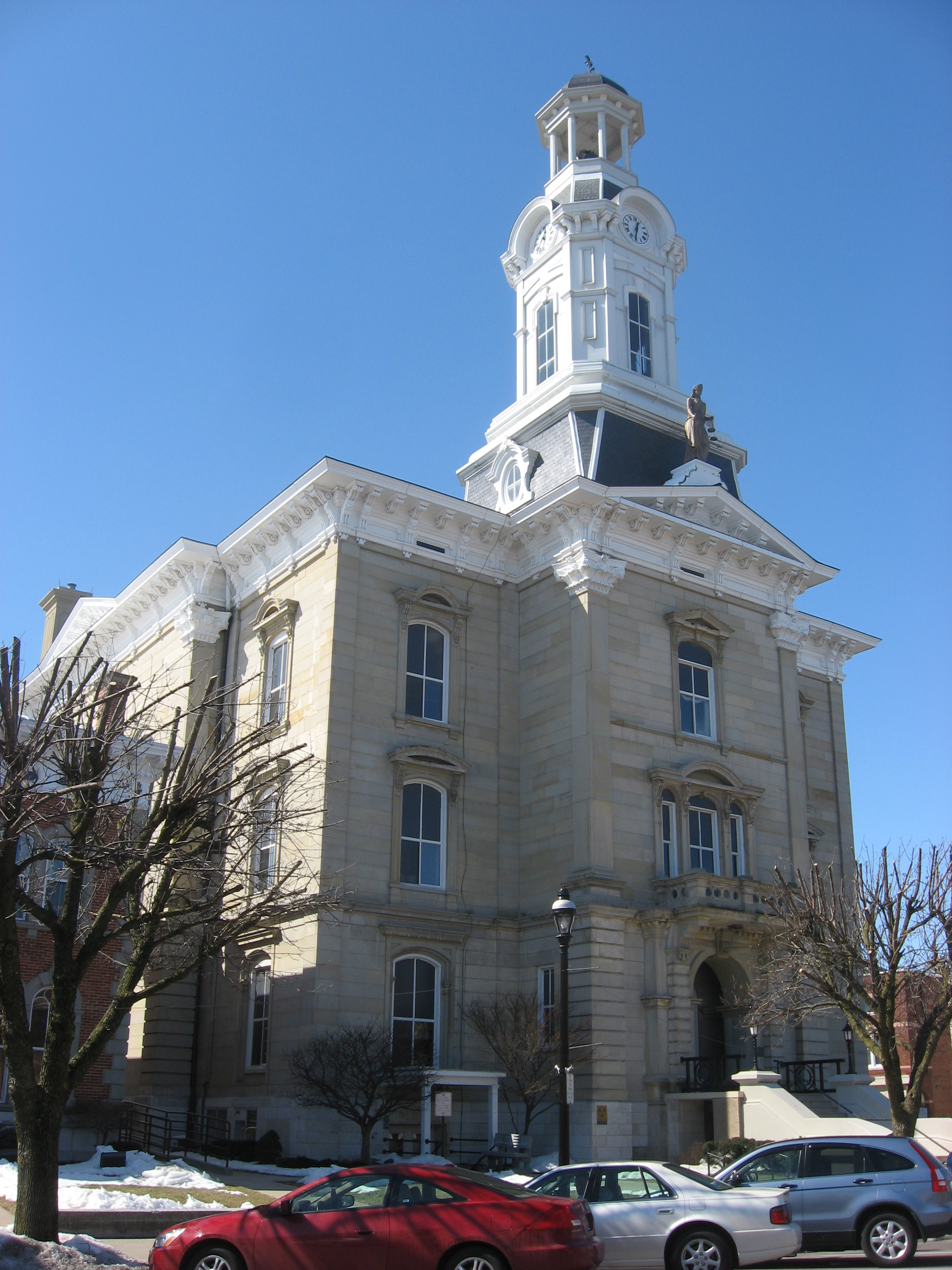
- Darke County Courthouse, Sheriff's House and Jail

- Flag

- Location within the U.S. state of Ohio
- Coordinates: 40°08′N 84°37′W
- Country: United States
- State: Ohio
- Founded: January 3, 1809
- Named for: William Darke
- Seat: Greenville
- Largest city: Greenville

Area
  - Total: 600 sq mi (1,600 km^{2})
  - Land: 598 sq mi (1,550 km^{2})
  - Water: 1.7 sq mi (4.4 km^{2}) 0.3%

Population (2020)
  - Total: 51,881
  - Estimate (2025): 51,520 ▼
  - Density: 86/sq mi (33/km^{2})
- Time zone: UTC−5 (Eastern)
  - Summer (DST): UTC−4 (EDT)
- ZIP Codes: 45303, 45304, 45308, 45328, 45331, 45332, 45346, 45348, 45350, 45351, 45352, 45358, 45362, 45380, 45388, 45390
- Area code: 937, 326
- Congressional district: 8th
- Website: www.mydarkecounty.com

Darke County is a county in the U.S. state of Ohio. As of the 2020 census, the population was 51,881. Its county seat and largest city is Greenville. The county was created in 1809 and later organized in 1817. It is named for William Darke, an officer in the American Revolutionary War. Darke County comprises the Greenville Micropolitan Statistical Area, which is also included in the Dayton–Springfield–Sidney Combined Statistical Area.

== History ==
=== Early history ===
Human activity in Darke County is believed to have emerged under the Adena culture during the Woodland period, roughly between 500 BCE and 100 AD. The Adena were later replaced by a series of Native American trading cultures known as the Ohio Hopewell, which were replaced by the Fort Ancient culture by 1000 AD. Although Darke County was in these cultures' spheres of influence, no major archaeological sites remain in the area. By the 1600s, the Miami people had settled the region, establishing their principal village at what is now Piqua in neighboring Miami County.

Europeans nominally owned the Louisiana Territory for centuries, dividing it among several different European countries over the years. Despite this, even as major settlements such as Detroit and St. Louis were established across the region, Darke County remained unsettled for most of that time.

The first major settlement was established at Fort Jefferson in 1791, and the base was used as a staging ground during the Northwest Indian War, but saw no action. Another camp was established in 1793 at Fort Greenville, where the historic Treaty of Greenville was signed in 1795, ceding control of Southern Ohio from the Native American tribes to the United States.

=== Settlement and 19th century ===
In 1807, the first European settlers began arriving in Darke County (then part of Miami). By 1808, initial plans were established for a settlement at the abandoned Fort Greenville that became the city of Greenville. Darke County split off from Miami County in 1809, and settlement continued to grow during the early 19th century, with major settlement outside Greenville proper hampered by unfavorable swampland. By mid-century, the county had roughly 15,000 people.

The railroad arrived in Darke County in 1850, and soon the county was a major intersection for three railroads, drastically spurring its economy. Despite its small size, Darke County had developed a vibrant civil society and had many churches and banking institutions, as well as two newspapers. The county saw a large influx of German immigrants at this time, which added to the community's social engagement.

During the American Civil War, Darke County was staunchly Unionist, and despite its small population it soon raised three full companies of volunteers for the Union Army. While the county was never on the Underground Railroad, local volunteers assisted escaped slaves moving to free states. During this time famed sharpshooter Annie Oakley was born there. She remains one of the county's most famous people.

=== 20th century and modern day ===
Darke County's growth slowed during the 20th century, with its economy shifting towards manufacturing and light industry instead of just agriculture. It benefited from the growth of the Dayton metropolitan area toward the end of the century, but began to see its population decline during the late 20th century as manufacturing slowed nationwide and Dayton began losing people.

Darke County's economy has since rebounded and its population has remained steady, with massive agricultural and industrial investments making it one of the nation's best-performing micropolitan areas and a substantial amount of the working population still commuting to Dayton. As home to the Eldora Speedway, the county also hosts one of the Dayton metropolitan area's biggest tourist events.

== Geography ==
According to the U.S. Census Bureau, the county has an area of 600 square miles (1,600 km^{2}), of which 598 square miles (1,550 km^{2}) is land and 1.7 square miles (4.4 km^{2}) (0.3%) is water.

=== Adjacent counties ===
- Mercer County (north)
- Shelby County (east)
- Miami County (east)
- Montgomery County (southeast)
- Preble County (south)
- Wayne County, Indiana (southwest)
- Randolph County, Indiana (west)
- Jay County, Indiana (northwest)

== Demographics ==
Historical population
| Census | Pop. | Note | %± |
|---|---|---|---|
| 1820 | 3,622 | | — |
| 1830 | 6,204 | | 71.3% |
| 1840 | 13,282 | | 114.1% |
| 1850 | 20,276 | | 52.7% |
| 1860 | 26,009 | | 28.3% |
| 1870 | 32,278 | | 24.1% |
| 1880 | 40,496 | | 25.5% |
| 1890 | 42,961 | | 6.1% |
| 1900 | 42,532 | | −1.0% |
| 1910 | 42,933 | | 0.9% |
| 1920 | 42,911 | | −0.1% |
| 1930 | 38,009 | | −11.4% |
| 1940 | 38,831 | | 2.2% |
| 1950 | 41,799 | | 7.6% |
| 1960 | 45,612 | | 9.1% |
| 1970 | 49,141 | | 7.7% |
| 1980 | 55,096 | | 12.1% |
| 1990 | 53,619 | | −2.7% |
| 2000 | 53,309 | | −0.6% |
| 2010 | 52,959 | | −0.7% |
| 2020 | 51,881 | | −2.0% |
| 2025 (est.) | 51,520 | ▼ | −0.7% |
U.S. Decennial Census; 1790–1960 1900–1990; 1990–2000 2020

=== 2020 census ===
As of the 2020 census, the county had a population of 51,881. The median age was 42.5 years. 23.7% of residents were under the age of 18 and 20.8% of residents were 65 years of age or older. For every 100 females there were 99.2 males, and for every 100 females age 18 and over there were 96.9 males age 18 and over.

The racial makeup of the county was 95.1% White, 0.6% Black or African American, 0.2% American Indian and Alaska Native, 0.4% Asian, 0.1% Native Hawaiian and Pacific Islander, 0.7% from some other race, and 3.1% from two or more races. Hispanic or Latino residents of any race comprised 1.7% of the population.

28.3% of residents lived in urban areas, while 71.7% lived in rural areas.

There were 20,925 households in the county, of which 28.1% had children under the age of 18 living in them. Of all households, 51.9% were married-couple households, 18.0% were households with a male householder and no spouse or partner present, and 23.0% were households with a female householder and no spouse or partner present. About 28.8% of all households were made up of individuals and 14.9% had someone living alone who was 65 years of age or older.

There were 22,599 housing units, of which 7.4% were vacant. Among occupied housing units, 73.4% were owner-occupied and 26.6% were renter-occupied. The homeowner vacancy rate was 1.1% and the rental vacancy rate was 5.6%.

=== Racial and ethnic composition ===
Darke County, Ohio – Racial and ethnic composition Note: the US Census treats Hispanic/Latino as an ethnic category. This table excludes Latinos from the racial categories and assigns them to a separate category. Hispanics/Latinos may be of any race.
| Race / ethnicity (NH = Non-Hispanic) | Pop 1980 | Pop 1990 | Pop 2000 | Pop 2010 | Pop 2020 | % 1980 | % 1990 | % 2000 | % 2010 | % 2020 |
|---|---|---|---|---|---|---|---|---|---|---|
| White alone (NH) | 54,372 | 52,874 | 52,046 | 51,365 | 48,994 | 98.69% | 98.61% | 97.63% | 96.99% | 94.44% |
| Black or African American alone (NH) | 167 | 183 | 204 | 233 | 302 | 0.30% | 0.34% | 0.38% | 0.44% | 0.58% |
| Native American or Alaska Native alone (NH) | 64 | 90 | 81 | 71 | 92 | 0.12% | 0.17% | 0.15% | 0.13% | 0.18% |
| Asian alone (NH) | 69 | 109 | 132 | 159 | 181 | 0.13% | 0.20% | 0.25% | 0.30% | 0.35% |
| Native Hawaiian or Pacific Islander alone (NH) | x | x | 12 | 4 | 26 | x | x | 0.02% | 0.01% | 0.05% |
| Other race alone (NH) | 45 | 20 | 24 | 28 | 122 | 0.08% | 0.04% | 0.05% | 0.05% | 0.24% |
| Mixed race or Multiracial (NH) | x | x | 353 | 453 | 1,305 | x | x | 0.66% | 0.86% | 2.52% |
| Hispanic or Latino (any race) | 379 | 343 | 457 | 646 | 859 | 0.69% | 0.64% | 0.86% | 1.22% | 1.66% |
| Total | 55,096 | 53,619 | 53,309 | 52,959 | 51,881 | 100.00% | 100.00% | 100.00% | 100.00% | 100.00% |

=== 2010 census ===
As of the 2010 United States census, there were 52,959 people, 20,929 households, and 14,673 families living in the county. The population density was 88.5 inhabitants per square mile (34.2/km^{2}). There were 22,730 housing units at an average density of 38.0 units per square mile (14.7 units/km^{2}). The racial makeup of the county was 97.8% white, 0.4% black or African American, 0.3% Asian, 0.2% American Indian, 0.4% from other races, and 0.9% from two or more races. Those of Hispanic or Latino origin made up 1.2% of the population. In terms of ancestry, 38.9% were German, 11.5% were American, 10.6% were Irish, and 9.0% were English.

Of the 20,929 households, 31.9% had children under the age of 18 living with them, 56.7% were married couples living together, 9.0% had a female householder with no husband present, 29.9% were non-families, and 25.9% of all households were made up of individuals. The average household size was 2.50, and the average family size was 3.00. The median age was 40.8 years.

The median income for a household in the county was $44,280, and the median income for a family was $53,454. Males had a median income of $40,402 versus $28,310 for females. The per capita income for the county was $21,483. About 7.5% of families and 10.6% of the population were below the poverty line, including 14.5% of those under age 18 and 8.1% of those age 65 or over.

=== 2000 census ===
As of the census of 2000, there were 53,309 people, 20,419 households, and 14,905 families living in the county. The population density was 89 inhabitants per square mile (34/km^{2}). There were 21,583 housing units at an average density of 36 units per square mile (14/km^{2}). The racial makeup of the county was 98.09% White, 0.39% Black or African American, 0.17% Native American, 0.25% Asian, 0.02% Pacific Islander, 0.34% from other races, and 0.74% from two or more races. 0.86% of the population were Hispanic or Latino of any race. 43.1% were of German, 20.1% American, 8.1% English, 6.8% Irish and 5.8% French ancestry according to Census 2000.

There were 20,419 households, out of which 33.30% had children under the age of 18 living with them, 61.00% were married couples living together, 8.00% had a female householder with no husband present, and 27.00% were non-families. 23.50% of all households were made up of individuals, and 11.00% had someone living alone who was 65 years of age or older. The average household size was 2.56, and the average family size was 3.03.

In the county, the population was spread out, with 26.30% under the age of 18, 7.80% from 18 to 24, 27.50% from 25 to 44, 23.20% from 45 to 64, and 15.30% who were 65 years of age or older. The median age was 37 years. For every 100 females, there were 96.10 males. For every 100 females age 18 and over, there were 93.30 males.

The median income for a household in the county was $39,307, and the median income for a family was $45,735. Males had a median income of $32,933 versus $23,339 for females. The per capita income for the county was $18,670. About 6.00% of families and 8.00% of the population were below the poverty line, including 10.10% of those under age 18 and 9.20% of those age 65 or over.

== Economy ==
Darke County's economy was originally agricultural, but hampered by unfavorable soil. The arrival of the railroad heavily boosted the county's economy, which was at the junction of three railroads and thus briefly an important hub for industry. As neighboring Dayton grew during the manufacturing boom of the early 20th century, Darke County diversified its economy, gaining both light manufacturing of its own and to a lesser extent becoming a suburb of Dayton. As Dayton became part of the Rust Belt and manufacturing decline nationally, Darke County was affected, entering a prolonged downturn. Large investments from manufacturing companies have since rejuvenated the county's economy, and Darke County has become Ohio's second-most successful micropolitan area.

Darke County employment percentages (>1%)
| Industry name | Percent annual employment |
|---|---|
| Manufacturing | 26.6% |
| Healthcare and Social Services | 14.1% |
| Retail | 9.5% |
| Educational Services | 7.8% |
| Transportation and Logistics | 6.9% |
| Wholesale Trade | 5.5% |
| Construction | 5.2% |
| Accommodation and Food Services | 4.7% |
| Agriculture | 3.4% |
| Finance | 3.4% |
| Other | 3.0% |
| Public Administration | 2.5% |
| Professional Services | 2.5% |
| Administrative Services | 2.1% |
| Arts and Entertainment | 1% |

== Culture and media ==
=== Culture ===
Despite Darke County's small size, it has several events centers and cultural events.

- The Eldora Speedway is the largest entertainment venue in the Dayton metro area, and hosts prestigious dirt late model racing events such as the Kings Royal (since 1984) and World 100 (since 1954).
- Poultry Days is a major poultry-oriented event celebrated annually since 1952 that is hosted in Versailles and attracts crowds as large as 50,000. The event also hosts one of the world's largest Ultimate frisbee competitions.
- The Annie Oakley Festival, hosted yearly in Greenville, celebrates the life of Annie Oakley, a Greenville native and one of the most famous female sharpshooters in history.

=== Media ===
==== Newspapers ====
- The Daily Advocate, published since 1883, is the newspaper of record for Greenville and Darke County.

==== Television ====
- WDTN operates as the Miami Valley's local NBC affiliate.
- WPTD and WPTO operate as the Miami Valley's local PBS affiliates.
- WHIO-TV operates as the Miami Valley's local CBS affiliate.
- WKEF operates as the Miami Valley's local ABC, FOX, and MyNetworkTV affiliate.

== Government and politics ==
=== Government ===
Ohio is represented in the United States Senate by Bernie Moreno and Jon Husted, both Republicans. It is represented in the United States House of Representatives as part of Ohio's 8th congressional district by Republican Warren Davidson. At the state level, Darke County is in Ohio's 5th senatorial district, represented by Republican Steve Huffman. It is in the Ohio House of Representatives' 80th and 84th district, represented by Republicans Johnathan Newman and Angela King, respectively. Judicially, Darke County is in Ohio's 2nd courts of appeals district.

Like most Ohio counties, Darke County has a three-member Board of County Commissioners elected at-large who oversee the various county departments. It also has several elected county officials.

==== County commissioners ====
| Office | Name | Party |
|---|---|---|
| Commissioner | Matthew Aultman | Republican |
| Commissioner | Marshall Combs | Republican |
| Commissioner | Aaron Flatter | Republican |

==== County officials ====
| Office | Name | Party |
|---|---|---|
| Prosecutor | James Bennett | Republican |
| Auditor | Carol Ginn | Republican |
| Clerk of Courts | Cindy Pike | Republican |
| Sheriff | Mark Whittaker | Republican |
| Recorder | Hillary Holzapfel | Republican |
| Treasurer | Scott Zumbrink | Democratic |
| Coroner | Susan Brown | Republican |
| Engineer | Jim Surber | Democratic |

=== Politics ===
Despite its Unionist sympathies, Darke County was a Democratic-leaning swing county for most of the 19th century. Primarily agricultural, the county was frequently more sympathetic to the Democratic Party, and the heavily German American population was at the time predominantly Democratic, voting for Republican presidential nominees only twice between 1860 and 1916 (though the Democratic margin of victory was never very large). Darke County became one of the region's first counties to shift toward Republicans in 1940, and has continued to deliver Republicans massive margins since then (aside from Lyndon B. Johnson's 1964 landslide). Since the beginning of the 21st century, the political realignment of rural voters has been especially pronounced in Darke County, where a large majority of voters cite the national Democratic Party's shift to the left on social issues such as abortion and gun control as the impetus for their shift to Republicans.

United States presidential election results for Darke County, Ohio
| Year | Republican | | Democratic | | Third party(ies) | |
| Year | No. | % | No. | % | No. | % |
|---|---|---|---|---|---|---|
| 1856 | 2,086 | 48.70% | 1,988 | 46.42% | 209 | 4.88% |
| 1860 | 2,460 | 49.23% | 2,479 | 49.61% | 58 | 1.16% |
| 1864 | 2,584 | 48.90% | 2,700 | 51.10% | 0 | 0.00% |
| 1868 | 2,989 | 48.73% | 3,145 | 51.27% | 0 | 0.00% |
| 1872 | 3,069 | 52.35% | 2,760 | 47.07% | 34 | 0.58% |
| 1876 | 3,577 | 43.38% | 4,667 | 56.60% | 1 | 0.01% |
| 1880 | 4,046 | 43.46% | 5,167 | 55.51% | 96 | 1.03% |
| 1884 | 4,390 | 44.29% | 5,442 | 54.91% | 79 | 0.80% |
| 1888 | 4,267 | 41.84% | 5,495 | 53.88% | 437 | 4.28% |
| 1892 | 3,737 | 39.99% | 4,916 | 52.61% | 691 | 7.40% |
| 1896 | 4,384 | 41.28% | 6,151 | 57.92% | 84 | 0.79% |
| 1900 | 4,834 | 43.79% | 6,003 | 54.38% | 201 | 1.82% |
| 1904 | 5,203 | 49.26% | 5,030 | 47.62% | 329 | 3.11% |
| 1908 | 4,951 | 42.60% | 6,391 | 54.99% | 281 | 2.42% |
| 1912 | 3,107 | 30.43% | 5,027 | 49.24% | 2,075 | 20.33% |
| 1916 | 4,322 | 39.78% | 6,186 | 56.94% | 357 | 3.29% |
| 1920 | 9,552 | 52.59% | 8,459 | 46.58% | 151 | 0.83% |
| 1924 | 9,166 | 52.92% | 7,316 | 42.24% | 839 | 4.84% |
| 1928 | 11,765 | 66.34% | 5,822 | 32.83% | 147 | 0.83% |
| 1932 | 8,284 | 41.65% | 11,122 | 55.92% | 483 | 2.43% |
| 1936 | 8,375 | 41.29% | 11,114 | 54.79% | 794 | 3.91% |
| 1940 | 11,147 | 53.60% | 9,651 | 46.40% | 0 | 0.00% |
| 1944 | 11,135 | 58.08% | 8,036 | 41.92% | 0 | 0.00% |
| 1948 | 8,956 | 50.28% | 8,770 | 49.23% | 87 | 0.49% |
| 1952 | 13,670 | 64.28% | 7,597 | 35.72% | 0 | 0.00% |
| 1956 | 13,447 | 65.32% | 7,138 | 34.68% | 0 | 0.00% |
| 1960 | 14,048 | 64.55% | 7,715 | 35.45% | 0 | 0.00% |
| 1964 | 8,581 | 40.83% | 12,433 | 59.17% | 0 | 0.00% |
| 1968 | 10,926 | 53.78% | 7,371 | 36.28% | 2,018 | 9.93% |
| 1972 | 13,862 | 65.71% | 6,534 | 30.97% | 700 | 3.32% |
| 1976 | 11,580 | 52.75% | 9,901 | 45.10% | 472 | 2.15% |
| 1980 | 12,773 | 58.17% | 7,635 | 34.77% | 1,550 | 7.06% |
| 1984 | 16,379 | 72.81% | 5,904 | 26.25% | 211 | 0.94% |
| 1988 | 14,914 | 67.93% | 6,851 | 31.21% | 189 | 0.86% |
| 1992 | 11,098 | 45.44% | 7,016 | 28.72% | 6,312 | 25.84% |
| 1996 | 10,798 | 46.88% | 8,871 | 38.52% | 3,363 | 14.60% |
| 2000 | 14,817 | 63.68% | 7,741 | 33.27% | 709 | 3.05% |
| 2004 | 18,306 | 69.57% | 7,846 | 29.82% | 161 | 0.61% |
| 2008 | 17,290 | 66.92% | 7,964 | 30.82% | 584 | 2.26% |
| 2012 | 18,108 | 71.21% | 6,826 | 26.84% | 496 | 1.95% |
| 2016 | 20,012 | 78.17% | 4,470 | 17.46% | 1,119 | 4.37% |
| 2020 | 22,004 | 81.01% | 4,731 | 17.42% | 426 | 1.57% |
| 2024 | 22,234 | 82.01% | 4,583 | 16.90% | 295 | 1.09% |

== Education ==
=== Community colleges ===
A branch of Edison State Community College is in Greenville.

=== Public school districts ===
The county's school districts (including any district with portions in the county, even if the schools and/or administrative offices are in another county) are:

- Ansonia Local Schools
  - Ansonia High School, Ansonia (the Tigers)
- Arcanum-Butler Local School District
  - Arcanum High School, Arcanum (the Trojans)
- Bradford Exempted Village School District
- Fort Loramie Local School District
- Fort Recovery Local School District
- Franklin Monroe Schools
  - Franklin Monroe Middle School/High School, Pitsburg (the Jets)
- Greenville City School District
  - Greenville Senior High School, Greenville (the Green Wave)
- Marion Local School District
- Minster Local School District
- Mississinawa Valley Local School District
  - Mississinawa Valley Junior/Senior High School, Union City (the Blackhawks)
- National Trail Local School District
- Newton Local School District
- Northmont City School District
- Russia Local School District
- St. Henry Consolidated Local School District
- Tri-County North Local School District
- Tri-Village Local School District
  - Tri-Village High School, New Madison (the Patriots)
- Versailles Exempted Village Schools
  - Versailles High School, Versailles (the Tigers)

== Transportation ==
=== Airports ===
The Darke County Airport is two nautical miles (2.3 mi; 3.7 km) southwest of Versailles's central business district.

=== Major highways ===
- US 127
- US 36
- SR 121
- SR 49
- SR 47
- SR 571
- SR 118
- SR 726
- SR 503
- SR 722
- SR 185
- SR 121

== Communities ==
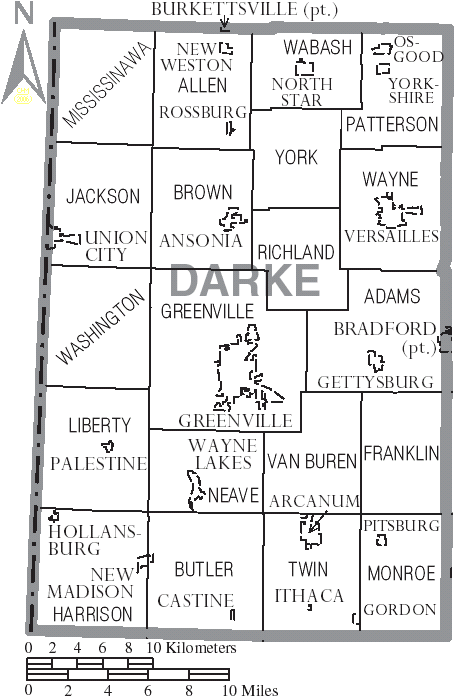
Map of Darke County, Ohio with Municipal and Township Labels

=== City ===
- Greenville (county seat)

=== Villages ===
- Ansonia
- Arcanum
- Bradford
- Burkettsville
- Castine
- Gettysburg
- Gordon
- Hollansburg
- Ithaca
- New Madison
- New Weston
- North Star
- Osgood
- Palestine
- Pitsburg
- Rossburg
- Union City
- Versailles
- Wayne Lakes
- Yorkshire

=== Townships ===
- Adams
- Allen
- Brown
- Butler
- Franklin
- Greenville
- Harrison
- Jackson
- Liberty
- Mississinawa
- Monroe
- Neave
- Patterson
- Richland
- Twin
- Van Buren
- Wabash
- Washington
- Wayne
- York

=== Unincorporated communities ===
- Abbottsville
- Beamsville
- Braffetsville
- Brock
- Coletown
- Dawn
- Delisle
- Fort Jefferson
- Frenchtown
- Hill Grove
- Horatio
- Jaysville
- Lightsville
- Nashville
- New Harrison
- Otterbein
- Painter Creek
- Pikeville
- Poplar Ridge
- Rose Hill
- Savona
- Stelvideo
- Tampico
- Weavers
- Webster
- Willowdell
- Woodington
- Yankeetown

== Historic places ==
Darke County has 25 places on the National Register of Historic Places, including the Darke County Courthouse, Sheriff's House, and Jail, and the Versailles Town Hall and Wayne Township House.

Darke County is home to the Eldora Speedway, near New Weston.

== Notable residents ==
- Joseph Lowery Johnson, U.S. ambassador to Liberia
- Kathryn Magnolia Johnson, political activist
- Matt Light, NFL player
- Lucullus Virgil McWhorter, farmer and frontiersman
- Annie Oakley, 19th-century markswoman
- John Scalzi, Hugo Award-winning author
- Lowell Thomas, travel author and broadcaster

== See also ==
- National Register of Historic Places listings in Darke County, Ohio
