= Savona, Ohio =

Unincorporated community in Ohio, U.S.

Coordinates: 39°59′22″N 84°39′42″W

Savona is an unincorporated community in Darke County, in the U.S. state of Ohio.

== History ==
Savona was originally called Tecumseh. A post office called Tecumseh was established in 1885, the name was changed to Savona in 1897, and the post office closed in 1933.
