= Pikeville, Ohio =

Unincorporated community in Ohio, U.S.

Coordinates: 40°09′48″N 84°36′18″W

Pikeville is an unincorporated community in Darke County, in the U.S. state of Ohio.

== History ==
Pikeville was platted in 1866. A post office called Pikeville was established in 1862, and remained in operation until 1917. Besides the post office, Pikeville contained a church, school, railroad station, and a country store.
