= Fort Jefferson, Ohio =

Unincorporated community in Ohio, U.S.

Coordinates: 40°01′35″N 84°39′19″W

Fort Jefferson is an unincorporated community in Darke County, in the U.S. state of Ohio.

== History ==
A post office called Fort Jefferson was established in 1823, and remained in operation until 1906. A memorial to historic Fort Jefferson is located there.
