= SS Città di Savona =

A number of ships have been named Città di Savona, after the city of Savona in Italy.

- SS Città di Savona (1856), in service 1890–91
- SS Città di Savona (1930), sunk on 24 March 1943
