= Darke County Airport =

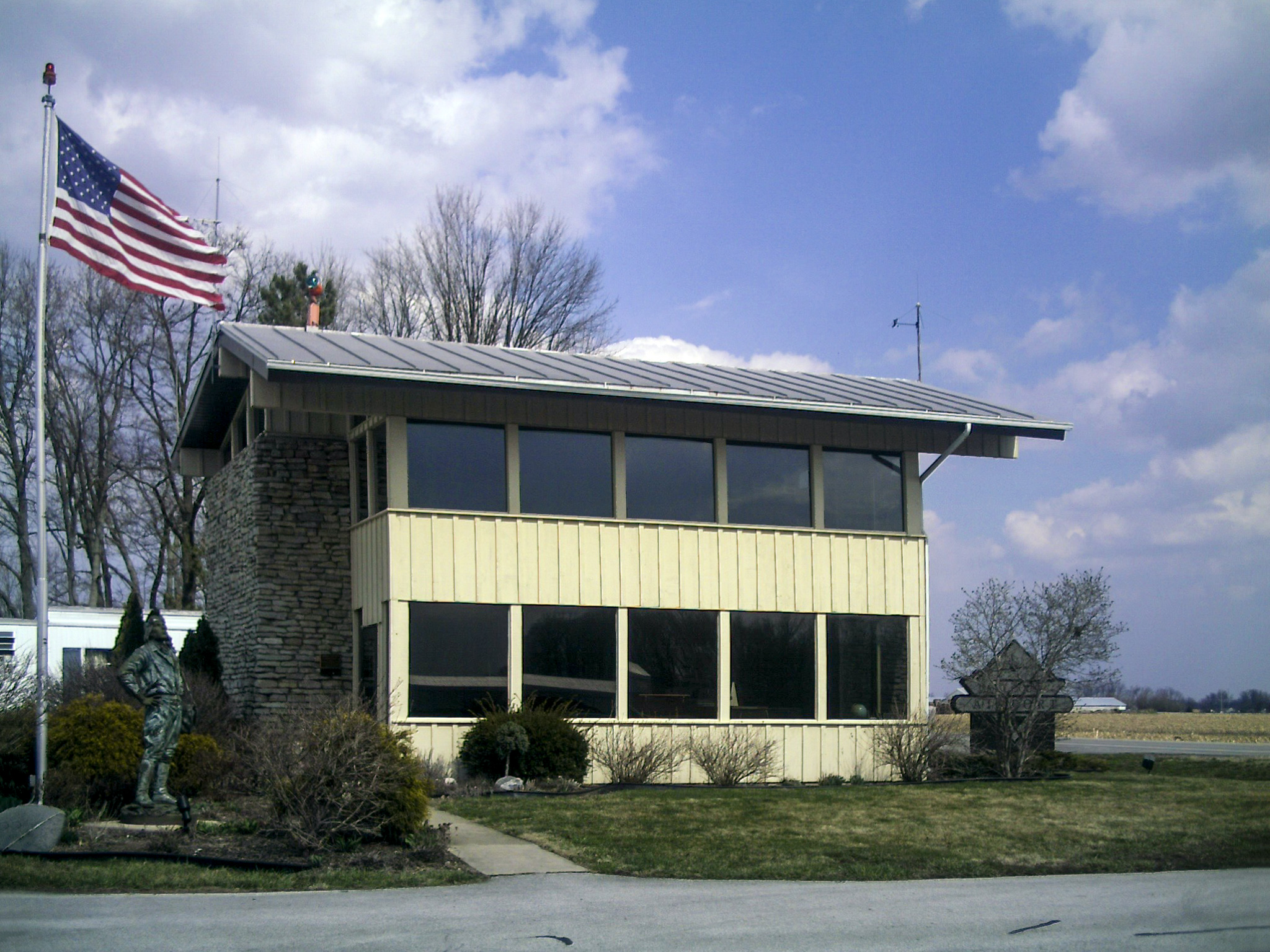
- Airport building, used as a waiting area
- IATA: none; ICAO: KVES; FAA LID: VES

Summary
- Airport type: Public
- Owner: Darke County Commissioners
- Serves: Versailles, Ohio
- Time zone: UTC−05:00 (-5)
  - Summer (DST): UTC−04:00 (-4)
- Elevation AMSL: 1,007 ft (307 m)
- Coordinates: 40°12′16″N 084°31′55″W

Map
- Location of airport in Ohio VES (the United States)

Runways
Direction	Length		Surface
Direction	ft	m	Surface
9/27	4,802	1,464	Asphalt

Statistics (2021)
- Aircraft operations: 12,775
- Based aircraft: 29
- Source: Federal Aviation Administration

Darke County Airport (ICAO: KVES, FAA LID: VES) (Note: The airport formerly used the FAA location identifier I58.) is a county-owned, public-use airport in Darke County, Ohio, United States. It is located two nautical miles (4 km) southwest of the central business district of Versailles. It is along State Route 121 just south of Versailles. The airport is included in the National Plan of Integrated Airport Systems for 2011–2015, which categorized it as a general aviation facility.

Although most U.S. airports use the same three-letter location identifier for the FAA and IATA, this airport is assigned VES by the FAA, but has no designation from the IATA.

The airport holds events such as fly-ins that feature old warbird aircraft, medical helicopters, and highway patrol aircraft.

== History ==
An effort to build an airport in Darke County had begun by 1963, when a businessman named R. E. Breaden had approached the county commission about the possibility of joining the Southwest Ohio Regional Airport Authority. Although he was turned down at the time, he announced in June 1965 that he would again attempt to convince the commission as the two dissenting members had been replaced. The first concrete step occurred in November of that year, when three members of the chamber of commerce were appointed to begin seeking a location. Three potential sites selected by the group were approved by the state in January 1966. Although the number had risen to six one year later, the sale prices many landowners were asking were considered prohibitive. However, a local farmer named Sherman Spiller and his wife offered to donate their land. Their only child, Waldon "Moon" Spillers, was an aviation enthusiast and had been using the 26 acres (11 ha) property to fly experimental aircraft since 1960. The county signed an option for the land on 8 February 1967, but the following day two competing offers were made: One close to Versailles and another east of Greenville. A day after a state grant for the construction of the airport was approved, a contract for the construction of the airport was awarded on 28 June 1967.

The Darke County Airport, subtitled Spillers Field, was dedicated on 29 October 1967. However, at least one airplane was using it earlier in the month. The 1,650 sq ft (153 m^{2}) terminal itself was dedicated the following year on September 8th and Moon Spillers given its keys to become the first airport manager. The airport was awarded another state grant in October 1969 to expand the apron, improve drainage and install navigation aids.

A TB-25N, purchased by a local resident, arrived at the airport in April 1976. It was later joined by a P-51A Spillers recovered from near Cantwell, Alaska approximately two years later. At the same time, EAA Chapter 109 and around 13 homebuilt aircraft were housed at the airport. By late October 1979, enough t-hangars to hold 25 to 30 aircraft had been built. The runway was repaved in July 1980.

In early September 1985, the county voted to apply for a federal grant to conduct repairs at the airport.

In January 1991, the county contracted with a consulting company in preparation for the creation of an airport master plan. As of August 1992, construction on a hangar for the Midmark Corporation's jet was underway and an 800-foot (240 m) runway extension was almost complete. By 1993, Moon's son, Dave, who had started taking flying lessons at the airport since he was 14, had taken over from his father as airport manager.

In 2007, light lenses were stolen from the airport.

In 2012, a section of State Route 242 was closed to allow the airport to use all of its runway surface for landings; with the road in place, planes need to approach at a higher altitude and touch down further down the runway to meet FAA obstacle clearance requirements.

A new airport manager was hired in May 2017.

In 2022, the Dark County Airport received $1.35 million to replace its FBO terminal, including funding from the Bipartisan Infrastructure and Jobs Act. Construction on the new building began in 2023, and a ribbon cutting ceremony to open the 2,500 sq ft (230 m^{2}) terminal was held in April 2024. The facility aims at expanding the airport's attraction, especially as traffic increases. It received additional funding in April 2023 to improve the terminal's facilities and in August 2024 for a new parking lot.

== Facilities and aircraft ==
=== Facilities ===
Darke County Airport covers an area of 42 acres (17 ha) at an elevation of 1,007 feet (307 m) above mean sea level. It has one runway designated 9/27 with an asphalt surface measuring 4,802 by 75 feet (1,464 x 23 m).

The airport has a fixed-base operator that sells both avgas and Jet A. Services such as hangars, courtesy cars, and rental cars are available; amenities such as internet, conference rooms, vending machines, a crew lounge, snooze rooms, and more are also available.

CareFlight Air & Mobile has a helicopter based at the airport, which serves as the company's northwest base. The helicopter was activated to respond to calls in early 2020.

=== Aircraft ===
For the 12-month period ending September 29, 2021, the airport had 12,775 aircraft operations, an average of 35 per day: 87% general aviation, 5% air taxi, and <1% military. At that time there were 29 aircraft based at the airport: 25 single-engine and 2 multi-engine airplanes as well as 1 jet and 1 helicopter.

== Accidents & incidents ==
- On 17 November 2018, a Piper Saratoga crashed while landing at the Darke County Airport. The left wing was torn off and the landing gear damaged.

== See also ==
- List of airports in Ohio
