= Yankeetown, Darke County, Ohio =

Unincorporated community in Ohio, U.S.

Coordinates: 39°55′47″N 84°43′20″W

Yankeetown is an unincorporated community in Darke County, in the U.S. state of Ohio.

== History ==
A post office called Yankeetown was established in 1851, and remained in operation until 1865. A church was built at Yankeetown in 1912.
