= History of the United States Army =

The history of the United States Army began in 1775. The Army's main responsibility has been in fighting land battles and military occupation. The Corps of Engineers also has a major role in controlling rivers inside the United States. The Continental Army was founded in response to a need for professional soldiers in the American Revolutionary War to fight the invading British Army. Until the 1940s, the Army was relatively small in peacetime. In 1947, the Air Force became completely independent of the Army Air Forces. The Army was under the control of the War Department until 1947, when DoW became the Defense Department and in 2026 the DoD was renamed back to The Department of War. The U.S. Army fought the Indian Wars of the 1790s, the War of 1812 (1812–15), Mexican–American War (1846–48), American Civil War (1861–65), American Indian Wars (ended 1890), Spanish–American War (1898), World War I (1917–18), World War II (1941–45), Korean War (1950–53) and Vietnam War (1965–71). Following the Cold War's end in 1991, Army has focused primarily on Western Asia, and also took part in the 1991 Gulf War and war in Iraq, and the war in Afghanistan.

When the American Revolutionary War began in April 1775, the colonial revolutionaries did not have an army. Previously, each colony had relied upon the militia, made up of part-time civilian-soldiers. The initial orders from Congress authorized ten companies of riflemen and one field artillery battery. The first full regiment of Regular Army infantry, the 3rd Infantry Regiment, was not formed until June 1784. After the war, the Continental Army was quickly disbanded because of the American distrust of standing armies, and irregular state militias became the new nation's sole ground army, with the exception of a regiment to guard the Western Frontier and one battery of artillery guarding West Point's arsenal.

During the War of 1812, an invasion of Canada failed due to state militias being widely used, and U.S. troops were unable to stop the British from burning the new capital of Washington, D.C. However, the Regular Army, under Generals Winfield Scott and Jacob Brown, proved they were professional and capable of winning tactical victories in the Niagara campaign of 1814. Between 1815 and 1860, the main role of the U.S. Army was fighting Native Americans in the West in the American Indian Wars, and manning coast artillery stations at major ports. The U.S. used regular units and many volunteer units in the Mexican–American War of 1846–48. At the outset of the American Civil War, the regular U.S. Army was small and generally assigned to defend the nation's frontiers from attacks by Indians. Following the Civil War, the U.S. Army fought more wars with Indians, who resisted U.S. expansion into the center of the continent.

A combined conscript and volunteer force, the National Army, was formed by the United States War Department in 1917 to fight in World War I. During World War II, the Army of the United States was formed as a successor to the National Army. The end of World War II set the stage for the ideological confrontation known as the Cold War. With the outbreak of the Korean War, concerns over the defense of Western Europe led to the establishment of NATO. During the Cold War, American troops and their allies fought communist forces in Korea and Vietnam (see containment). The 1980s was mostly a decade of reorganization. The Army converted to an all-volunteer force with greater emphasis on training and technology. By 1989, the Cold War was nearing its conclusion. The Army leadership reacted by starting to plan for a reduction in strength. After Desert Storm, the Army did not see major combat operations for the remainder of the 1990s. After the September 11 attacks, and as part of the war on terror, U.S. and other NATO forces invaded Afghanistan in 2001, replacing the Taliban government. The Army took part in the U.S. and allied 2003 invasion of Iraq.

== Continental Army ==
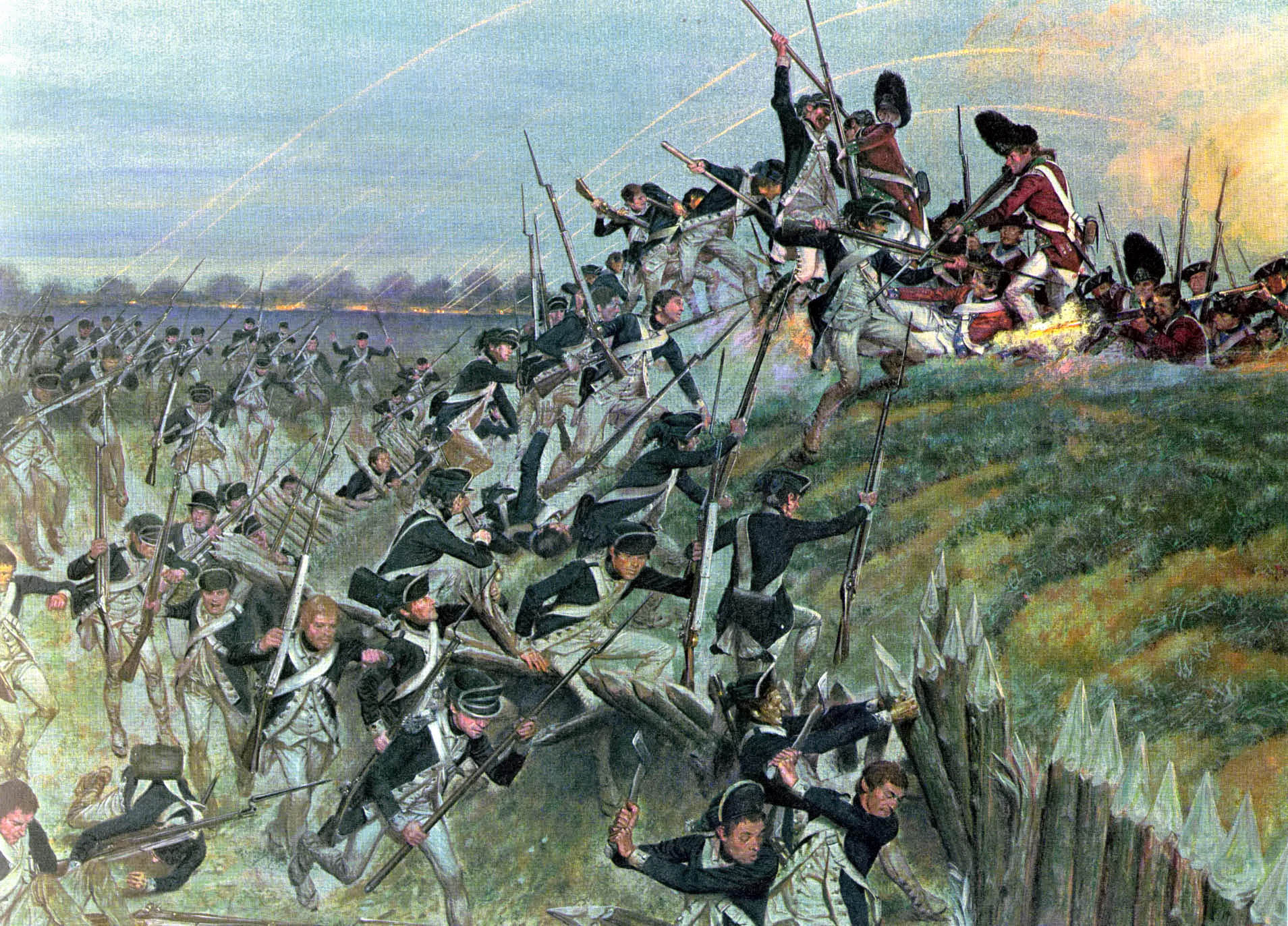
Storming of Redoubt#10 during the Siege of Yorktown.

The Continental Army consisted of troops from all 13 colonies. When the American Revolutionary War began at the Battles of Lexington and Concord in April 1775, the revolutionaries in the Thirteen Colonies did not have an army. Previously, each colony of British America had relied upon the militia, made up of part-time civilian-soldiers, for local defense, or the raising of temporary "provincial regiments" during specific crises such as the French and Indian War. As tensions with the British government increased in the years leading up to the war, colonists began to reform their militia in preparation for the potential conflict. Training of militiamen increased after the passage of the Intolerable Acts in 1774. Colonists such as Richard Henry Lee proposed creating a national militia force, but the First Continental Congress rejected the idea.

On April 23, 1775, the Massachusetts Provincial Congress authorized the raising of a colonial army consisting of 26 company regiments, followed shortly by similar but smaller forces raised by New Hampshire, Rhode Island, and Connecticut. On June 14, 1775, the Second Continental Congress decided to proceed with the establishment of a Continental Army for purposes of common defense, adopting the forces already in place outside Boston (22,000 troops) and New York (5,000). It also raised the first ten companies of Continental troops on a one-year enlistment, riflemen from Pennsylvania, Maryland, Delaware and Virginia to be used as light infantry, who later became the 1st Continental Regiment in 1776. On June 15, the Congress elected George Washington as Commander-in-Chief by unanimous vote The enlisted soldiers were young, poor, and often of Irish or German background. About one in ten were African American.

Washington succeeded in forcing the British out of Boston in 1776, but was defeated and almost captured later that year when he lost New York City. After crossing the Delaware River in the dead of winter, he defeated the British forces in two battles, at Trenton and Princeton, retook New Jersey and restored momentum to the Patriot cause. Because of his strategy, Revolutionary forces captured two major British armies at Saratoga in 1777 and Yorktown in 1781. Historians laud Washington for his selection and supervision of his generals, encouragement of morale and ability to hold together the army, coordination with the state governors and state militia units, relations with Congress and attention to supplies, logistics, intelligence, and training. In battle, however, Washington was repeatedly outmaneuvered by British generals with larger armies. After victory had been achieved in 1783, Washington resigned rather than seize power, proving his opposition to military dictatorship and his commitment to American republicanism.

=== Organization ===
The initial orders from Congress authorized ten companies of riflemen. However, the first full regiment of Regular Army infantry, the 3rd Infantry Regiment, was not formed until June 1784.

After the authorization of the creation of a Continental Army, Congress, on 16 June 1775, created multiple departments to help support the operations of the Army. These four departments would later be renamed as Corps: the Adjutant General's Corps, the Army Corps of Engineers, the Finance Corps and the Quartermasters Corps. Congress later authorized both the creation of Field Artillery and Cavalry units in November 1775 and December 1776 respectively.

Broadly speaking, Continental forces consisted of several successive armies, or establishments:

- The Continental Army of 1775, comprising the initial New England Army, organized by Washington into three divisions, six brigades, and 38 regiments. Major General Philip Schuyler's ten regiments in New York were sent to invade Canada.
- The Continental Army of 1776, reorganized after the initial enlistment period of the soldiers in the 1775 army had expired. Washington had submitted recommendations to the Continental Congress almost immediately after he had accepted the position of Commander-in-Chief, but these took time to consider and implement. Despite attempts to broaden the recruiting base beyond New England, the 1776 army remained skewed toward the Northeast both in terms of its composition and geographical focus. This army consisted of 36 regiments, most standardized to a single battalion of 768 men strong formed into eight companies, with a rank and file strength of 640.
- The Continental Army of 1777–80 was a result of several critical reforms and political decisions that came about when it was apparent that the British were sending massive forces to put an end to the American Revolution. The Continental Congress passed the "Eighty-eight Battalion Resolve", ordering each state to contribute one-battalion regiments in proportion to their population, and Washington was subsequently given authority to raise an additional 16 battalions. Also, enlistment terms were extended to three years or "the length of the war" to avoid the year-end crises that depleted forces (including the notable near collapse of the army at the end of 1776 which could have ended the war in a Continental, or American, loss by forfeit).
- The Continental Army of 1781–82 saw the greatest crisis on the American side in the war. Congress was bankrupt, making it very difficult to replenish the soldiers whose three-year terms had expired. Popular support for the war was at its all-time low, and Washington had to put down mutinies both in the Pennsylvania Line and New Jersey Line. Congress voted to cut funding for the Army, but Washington managed nevertheless to secure important strategic victories.
- The Continental Army of 1783–84 was succeeded by the United States Army, which persists to this day. As peace was closed with the British, most of the regiments were disbanded in an orderly fashion, though several had already been diminished.

In addition to the Continental Army regulars, local militia units, raised and funded by individual colonies/states, participated in battles throughout the war. Sometimes, the militia units operated independently of the Continental Army, but often local militias were called out to support and augment the Continental Army regulars during campaigns. (The militia troops developed a reputation for being prone to premature retreats, a fact that was integrated into the strategy at the Battle of Cowpens.)

== Early national period (1783–1812) ==
In 1783, at the conclusion of the Revolutionary War, a Congressional committee under Alexander Hamilton sought opinions on a permanent armed force. Washington submitted his "Sentiments on a Peace Establishment," which called for only a small force of only 2,631 men regiment to guard the western frontier and the borders with Canada and Florida. Planning for the transition to a peacetime force had begun in April 1783 at the request of a congressional committee chaired by Alexander Hamilton. The commander-in-chief discussed the problem with key officers before submitting the army's official views on May 2. Significantly, there was a broad consensus on the basic framework among the officers. Washington's proposal called for four components: a small regular army, a uniformly trained and organized militia, a system of arsenals, and a military academy to train the army's artillery and engineer officers. He wanted four infantry regiments, each assigned to a specific sector of the frontier, plus an artillery regiment. His proposed regimental organizations followed Continental Army patterns but had a provision for increased strength in the event of war. Washington expected the militia primarily to provide security for the country at the start of a war until the regular army could expand—the same role it had carried out in 1775 and 1776. Steuben and Duportail submitted their own proposals to Congress for consideration.

Congress again rejected Washington's concept for a peacetime force in October 1783. When moderate delegates then offered an alternative in April 1784 which scaled the projected army down to 900 men in one artillery and three infantry battalions, Congress rejected it as well, in part because New York feared that men retained from Massachusetts might take sides in a land dispute between Vermont and New York. Another proposal to retain 350 men and raise 700 new recruits also failed. On June 2, Congress ordered the discharge of all remaining men except twenty-five caretakers at Fort Pitt and fifty-five at West Point. The next day it created a peace establishment acceptable to all interests. The plan required four states to raise 700 men for one year's service. Congress instructed the Secretary of War to form the troops into eight infantry and two artillery companies. Pennsylvania, with a quota of 260 men, had the power to nominate a lieutenant colonel, who would be the senior officer. New York and Connecticut each were to raise 165 men and nominate a major; the remaining 110 men came from New Jersey. The economy was the watchword of this proposal, for each major served as a company commander, and line officers performed all staff duties except those of chaplain, surgeon, and surgeon's mate. Under Josiah Harmar, the First American Regiment slowly organized and achieved permanent status as an infantry regiment of the new Regular Army. The lineage of the First American Regiment is carried on by the 3rd United States Infantry Regiment (The Old Guard)

Economic constraints forced the new nation to rely heavily on irregular state militias. The Continental Army was quickly disbanded as part of the American distrust of standing armies, with the exception of the First American Regiment to guard the Western Frontier and one battery of artillery guarding West Point's arsenal. However, because of continuing conflict with Indians, it was soon realized that it was necessary to field a trained standing army. The first of these, the Legion of the United States, was established between June and November 1792 at Fort Lafayette, Pennsylvania, under Major Gen. "Mad" Anthony Wayne. The newly formed Legion moved in December 1792 to an encampment downriver on the Ohio River near Fort McIntosh named Legionville for training. In September 1793, the Legion moved by barge down the Ohio to a camp named Hobson's Choice two miles from Fort Washington (Cincinnati) on the western frontier. There it was joined by units from the Kentucky Militia. Their assignment was to advance to the site of St. Clair's earlier defeat, recover the cannons lost there, and continue to the Miami capital at Kekionga to establish U.S. sovereignty over northern and western Ohio and beyond.

However, the United States military realized it needed a well-trained standing army following St. Clair's defeat on November 4, 1791, when a force led by Major General Arthur St. Clair was almost entirely wiped out by the Northwestern Confederacy near Fort Recovery, Ohio. The plans, which were supported by U.S. President George Washington and Henry Knox, Secretary of War, led to the disbandment of the Continental Army and the creation of the Legion of the United States. The command would be based on the 18th-century military works of Henry Bouquet, a professional Swiss soldier who served as a colonel in the British Army, and French Marshal Maurice de Saxe. In 1792, Anthony Wayne, a renowned hero of the American Revolutionary War, was encouraged to leave retirement and return to active service as Commander-in-Chief of the Legion with the rank of major general.

A month later, the combined force under Wayne and Brigadier General Scott of Kentucky advanced northward into Indian territory beyond the northern outpost Fort Jefferson to establish the first in a succession of frontier forts on Ohio's western border named Fort Greene Ville.

The northern campaign culminated in victory at the Battle of Fallen Timbers in August 1794 near what is today the city of Toledo, Ohio, near the Ohio/Michigan border. The legion then advanced unopposed to Kekionga in northern Indiana near the Ohio border and established Fort Wayne at the site of the future city. The Treaty of Greenville in 1795 brought peace to the northern Ohio frontier and opened eastern and southern Ohio to settlement. The legion established other forts after Fort Wayne, notably Fort St. Mary's in western Ohio, and the settlement that grew up there was the site of several significant treaties in 1818. After Wayne's death in 1796, command of the legion passed to Wayne's executive officer and commandant of Fort Washington, Brig. Gen. James Wilkinson. The Legion was renamed the United States Army.

The Legion was recruited and raised in Pittsburgh. It was formed into four sub-legions. These were created from elements of the 1st and 2nd Regiments from the Continental Army. These units then became the First and Second Sub-Legions. The Third and Fourth Sub-Legions were raised from further recruits. From June 1792 to November 1792, the Legion was stationed at Fort LaFayette in Pittsburgh.

Throughout the winter of 1792-3, existing troops along with new recruits were drilled in military skills, tactics, and discipline at Legionville on the banks of the Ohio River near present-day Baden, Pennsylvania. The following Spring the newly named Legion of the United States left Legionville for the Northwest Indian War, a struggle between American Indian tribes affiliated with the Northwestern Confederacy in the area south of the Ohio River. The overwhelmingly successful campaign was concluded with the decisive victory at Fallen Timbers on August 20, 1794, Major General Anthony Wayne applied the techniques of wilderness operations perfected by Sullivan's 1779 expedition against the Iroquois. The training the troops received at Legionville was also seen as instrumental to this overwhelming victory.

Nevertheless, Steuben's Blue Book remained the official manual for the legion, as well as for the militia of most states, until Winfield Scott in 1835. In 1796, the United States Army was raised following the discontinuation of the legion of the United States.

In 1798, during the Quasi-War with France, the U.S. Congress established a three-year "Provisional Army" of 10,000 men, consisting of twelve regiments of infantry and six troops of light dragoons.

== 19th century ==
=== War of 1812 ===
The War of 1812, the second and last American war against the British, was less successful than the Revolution had been. An invasion of Canada failed due to the over-reliance of using state militias, and U.S. troops were unable to stop the British Army from burning the new capital of Washington, D.C. However, the Regular Army, under Generals Winfield Scott and Jacob Brown, proved they were professional and able to win tactical victories in the Niagara campaign of 1814. The nation celebrated the Southern militia's great victory under Andrew Jackson, at the Battle of New Orleans in January 1815, after the war had ended with the signing of the Treaty of Ghent on 24 December 1814.

The multiple failures and fiascos of the War of 1812 showed that thorough reform of the War Department was necessary. Secretary of War John C. Calhoun reorganized the department into a system of bureaus, whose chiefs held office for life, and a commanding general in the field, although the Congress did not authorize this position. Through the 1840s and 1850s, Winfield Scott was the senior general, only retiring at the start of the American Civil War in 1861. The bureau chiefs acted as advisers to the Secretary of War while commanding their own troops and field installations. The bureaus frequently conflicted among themselves, but in disputes with the commanding general, the Secretary of War generally supported the bureaus. Congress regulated the affairs of the bureaus in detail, and their chiefs looked to that body for support.

Calhoun set up the Bureau of Indian Affairs in 1824, the main agency within the War Department for dealing with Native Americans until 1849, when the Congress transferred it to the newly founded Department of the Interior.

=== Westward Expansion ===
Between 1815 and 1860, the main role of the Army was control of Indians in the West, and manning coast artillery stations at major ports. Most of the forces were stationed on the frontier, or and coastal defense units near seaports.

Transportation was a key issue and the Army (especially the Army Corps of Engineers) was given full responsibility for facilitating navigation on the rivers. The steamboat, first used on the Ohio River in 1811, made possible inexpensive travel using the river systems, especially the Mississippi and Missouri rivers and their tributaries. Army expeditions up the Missouri River in 1818–25 allowed engineers to improve the technology. For example, the Army's steamboat "Western Engineer" of 1819 combined a very shallow draft with one of the earliest stern wheels. In 1819–25 Colonel Henry Atkinson developed keelboats with hand-powered paddle wheels.

=== Seminole Wars ===
As the United States expanded westward, it also aimed to expand into Florida, both as a means to protect its southern border as well as to cut off an escape route for runaway slaves. This campaign resulted in the Seminole Wars in Florida. The First Seminole War was from 1814 to 1819, the Second Seminole War from 1835 to 1842, and the Third Seminole War from 1855 to 1858. While the majority of the Seminole ended up moving west onto reservations, some remained in Florida.

=== War with Mexico ===
The U.S. used regular units and many volunteer units to fight Mexico, 1846–48. The American strategy was threefold: to take control of the Southwest (New Mexico and California); to invade Mexico from the North under general Zachary Taylor. Finally to land troops and capture Mexico City with an army under General Winfield Scott. All the operations were successful; the Americans won all the major battles.

The army expanded from 6,000 regulars to more than 115,000. Of these, approximately 1.5% were killed in the fighting and nearly 10% died of disease; another 12% were wounded or discharged because of disease.

=== Civil War ===
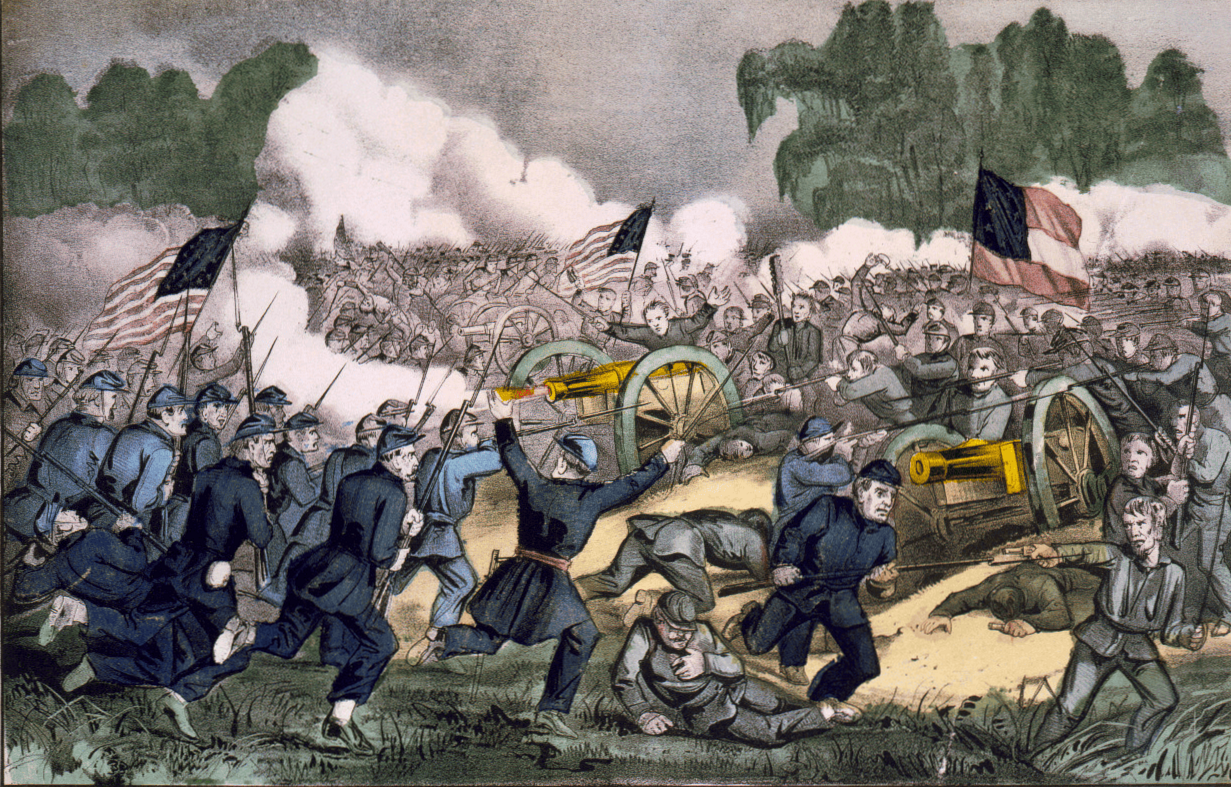
The Battle of Gettysburg, the turning point of the American Civil War

At the outset of the American Civil War the regular U.S. army was small and generally assigned to defend the nation's frontiers from Indian attacks. As one after another Southern state seceded many experienced officers and men resigned or left to join the Confederate States Army, further limiting the regular army's abilities.

The attack on Fort Sumter by South Carolina militia marked the beginning of hostilities. Both sides recruited large numbers of men into a new Volunteer Army, recruited and formed by the states. Regiments were recruited locally, with company officers elected by the men. Although many officers in the regular army accepted commissions in the new volunteer units outsiders were not usually welcome as officers, unless they were surgeons whose value was obvious. Colonels – often local politicians who helped raise the troops – were appointed by the governors, and generals were appointed by President Abraham Lincoln.

The Volunteer Army was so much larger than the Regular Army that entirely new units above the regimental level had to be formed. The grand plan involved geographical theaters, with armies (named after rivers such as the Army of the Potomac in the Eastern Theater) comprising brigades, divisions and corps headquarters.

The rapidly growing armies were relatively poorly trained when the first major battle of the war occurred at Bull Run in the middle of 1861. The embarrassing Union defeat and subsequent inability of the Confederacy to capitalize on their victory resulted in both sides spending more time organizing and training their green armies. Much of the subsequent actions taken in 1861 were skirmishes between pro-Union and pro-Confederacy irregular forces in border states like Missouri and Kentucky.

In 1862 the war became much more bloody, though neither side was able to gain a lasting strategic advantage over the other. However, the decisive battles of Gettysburg in the east and Vicksburg in the west allowed the momentum of the war to shift in favor of the Union in 1863. Increasingly, Confederate forces were outmatched by the more numerous and better equipped Union forces, whose greater population and economic resources became critical factors as the war became one of attrition. An increasingly effective naval blockade further damaged the Confederate war economy.

By 1864, long-term Union advantages in geography, manpower, industry, finance, political organization and transportation were overwhelming the Confederacy. Grant fought a remarkable series of bloody battles with Lee in Virginia in the summer of 1864. Lee's defensive tactics resulted in higher casualties for Grant's army, but Lee lost strategically overall as he could not replace his casualties and was forced to retreat into trenches around his capital, Richmond, Virginia. Meanwhile, in the West, William Tecumseh Sherman captured Atlanta in 1864. His March to the Sea destroyed a hundred-mile-wide swath of Georgia, with little Confederate resistance. In 1865, the Confederacy collapsed after Lee surrendered to Grant at Appomattox Courthouse.

In all, 2.2 million men served in the Union army; 360,000 of whom died from all causes – two-thirds from disease. The Volunteer Army was demobilized in summer 1865.

==== Logistics ====
While the Confederacy suffered from a worsening lack of adequate supplies, the Union forces typically had enough food, supplies, ammunition and weapons. The Union supply system, even as it penetrated deeper into the South, maintained its efficiency. The key leader was Quartermaster General Montgomery C. Meigs. Union quartermasters were responsible for most of the $3 billion spent for the war. They operated out of sixteen major depots, which formed the basis of the system of procurement and supply throughout the war. As the war expanded, operation of these depots became much more complex, with an overlapping and interweaving relationship between the Army and government operated factories, private factories, and numerous middlemen. The purchase of goods and services through contracts supervised by the quartermasters accounted for most of federal military expenditures, apart from the wages of the soldiers. The quartermasters supervised their own soldiers, and cooperated closely with state officials, manufacturers and wholesalers trying to sell directly to the army; and representatives of civilian workers looking for higher pay at government factories. The complex system was closely monitored by congressmen anxious to ensure that their districts won their share of contracts.

==== Black soldiers ====
Lincoln's Emancipation Proclamation of January 1, 1863, enabled both free blacks and escaped slaves, to join the Union Army. About 190,000 volunteered, further enhancing the numerical advantage the Union armies enjoyed over the Confederates, who did not dare emulate the equivalent manpower source for fear of fundamentally undermining the legitimacy of slavery. Black Union soldiers were mostly used in garrison duty, but they fought in several battles, such as the Battle of the Crater (1864), and the Battle of Nashville (1865).

There was bad blood between Confederates and black soldiers, with no quarter given by the Confederates. At Ft. Pillow on April 12, 1864 Confederate units under Maj. Gen. Nathan Bedford Forrest went wild and massacred black soldiers attempting to surrender, which further inflamed passions.

=== Indian wars of the late 19th century ===
Following the Civil War, the U.S. Army fought a series of wars with Native Americans, who resisted U.S. expansion into the center of the continent. By the 1890s the U.S. saw itself as a potential international player. The Army played a central role in winning the Spanish–American War of 1898 and the less well known Philippine–American War of 1899–1901.

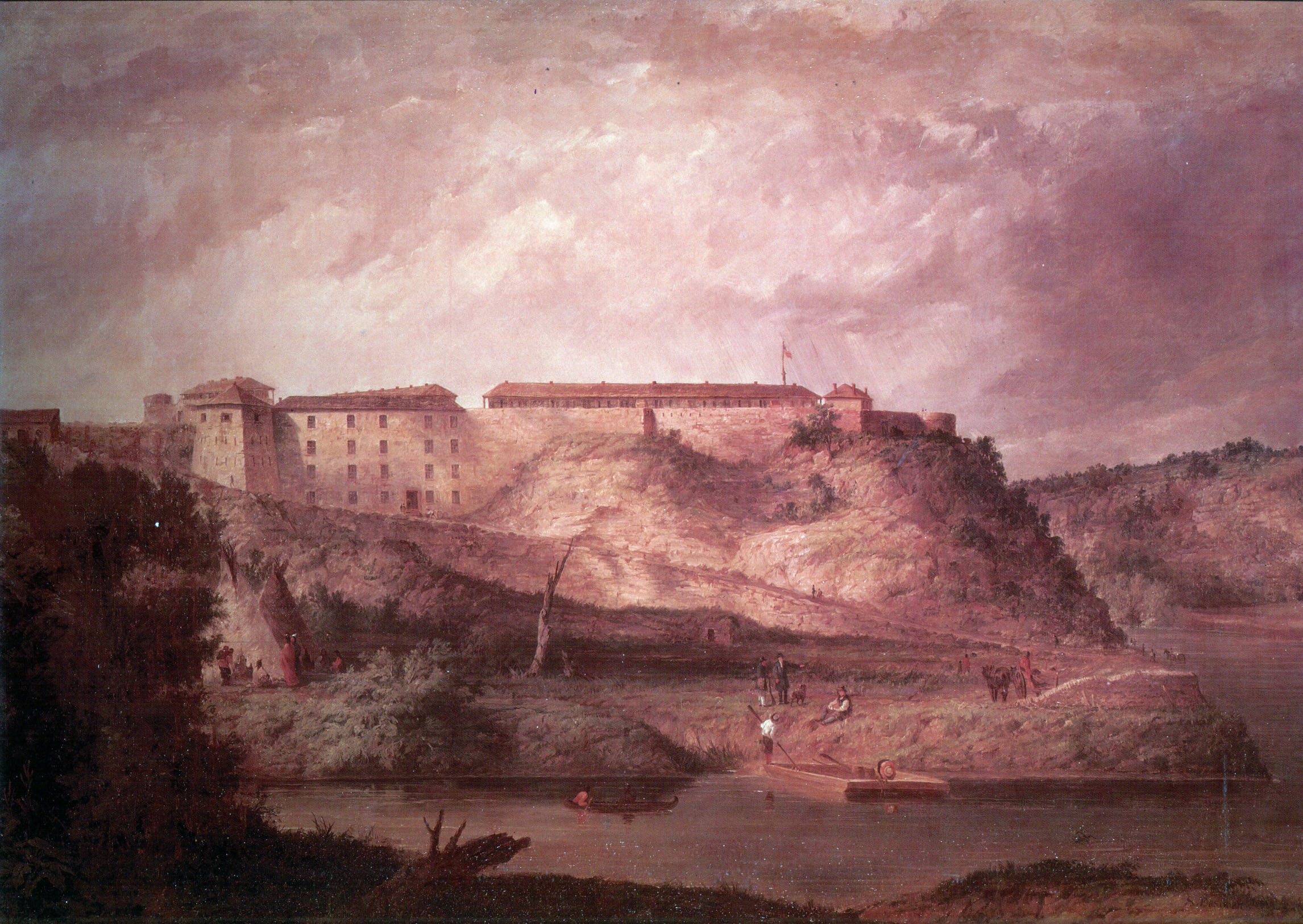
A painting of Fort Snelling.

As settlement sped up across the West after the transcontinental railroad was completed in 1869, clashes with Native Americans of the Plains and southwest reached a final phase. The military's mission was to clear the land of free-roaming Indians and put them onto reservations. The stiff resistance of battle-hardened, well-armed mounted Indian warriors resulted in the Indian Wars.

In the Apache and Navajo Wars, Colonel Christopher "Kit" Carson forced the Mescalero Apache onto a reservation in 1862. Skirmishes between Americans and Apaches continued until after the turn of the century. In 1863–1864, Carson used a scorched earth policy in the Navajo campaign, burning Navajo fields and homes, and capturing or killing their livestock. He was aided by other Indian tribes with long-standing enmity toward the Navajos, chiefly the Utes. Later in 1864, he fought a combined force of more than one thousand Kiowa, Comanche, and Plains Apache at the First Battle of Adobe Walls. Carson retreated but he managed to destroy an Indian village and winter supplies. In the Red River War which followed, the U.S. army systematically destroyed Comanche property, horses, and livelihood in the Texas panhandle, resulting in the surrender of the last Comanche war chief, Quanah Parker, in June 1875.

In June 1877, in the Nez Perce War the Nez Perce under Chief Joseph, unwilling to give up their traditional lands and move to a reservation, undertook a 1,200 mile fighting retreat from Oregon to near the Canada–US border in Montana. Numbering only 200 warriors, the Nez Perce battled some 2,000 American regulars and volunteers in a total of eighteen engagements, including four major battles and at least four fiercely contested skirmishes." The Nez Perce were finally surrounded at the Battle of Bear Paw and surrendered.

The Great Sioux War of 1876–77 was conducted by the Lakota under Sitting Bull and Crazy Horse. The conflict began after repeated violations of the Treaty of Fort Laramie (1868) once gold was discovered in the hills. By far the most famous battle was the one-sided Indian victory at the Battle of the Little Bighorn, in which combined Sioux and Cheyenne forces defeated the 7th Cavalry, led by General George Armstrong Custer. The West was largely pacified by 1890, apart from small Indian raids along the Mexican border.

Combat in the Indian wars resulted in the deaths of about 4,340 people, including soldiers, civilians and Native Americans. In all the Indian wars combined from 1790 to 1910, regular cavalry units fought in about 1000 engagements and suffered more than 2000 total killed and wounded. Disease and accidents caused far more Army casualties than combat; annually, eight soldiers per 1000 died from disease, and five per 1000 died from battle wounds or accidents.

== Twentieth century ==
=== Chief of Staff ===
Elihu Root was United States Secretary of War under presidents William McKinley and Theodore Roosevelt, 1899–1904. He reformed the organization of the War Department. He enlarged West Point and established the U.S. Army War College, as well as the General Staff. He changed the procedures for promotions and organized schools for the special branches of the service. He also devised the principle of rotating officers from staff to line. General Samuel Baldwin Marks Young became the first chief of staff in 1903-1904. The headquarters moved to Fort Myer in 1908.

According to Louis Cantor, Root designed a dual role for the National Guard - a militia for state service and a trained reserve for the regular army. Congress enacted this system embodied in the Dick Act (1903).

Prior to 1903, the senior military officer in the army was the Commanding General of the United States Army, who reported to the Secretary of War. From 1864 to 1865, Major General Henry Halleck (who had previously been Commanding General) served as "Chief of Staff of the Army" under the Commanding General, Lieutenant General Ulysses S. Grant, thus serving in a different office and not as the senior officer in the army.

=== Reorganization ===
In 1910, the U.S. Signal Corps acquired and flew the Army's first aircraft, the Wright Model A biplane.

The Maneuver Division was formed in San Antonio, Texas, in March 1911, to undertake offensive operations against Mexico during the Mexican Revolution. This was the United States' first attempt at modernizing the division concept. Major General Leonard Wood, then Army Chief of Staff, mobilized the division primarily to demonstrate to Congress that the United States was not adequately prepared for modern warfare. The division was disbanded on 7 August 1911.

Because of the mobilization difficulties experienced with the Maneuver Division, on 15 February 1913 a standing organization of a "regular army organized in divisions and cavalry brigades ready for immediate use as an expeditionary force or for other purposes..." and "an army of national citizen soldiers organized in peace in complete divisions and prepared to reenforce the Regular Army in time of war" was organized by Secretary of War Henry L. Stimson and known as the "Stimson Plan." The contiguous United States was divided into four geographic departments (Eastern, Central, Western, and Southern) and a regular army division assigned to each, and 12 geographic districts, each with a national guard infantry division assigned. 32 of the 48 state governors committed their national guards to support of the plan. There were also three artillery commands: the Northern Atlantic Coast Artillery District, the Southern Atlantic Coast Artillery District, and the Pacific Coast Artillery District.

In 1914 and 1916, U.S. troops were sent into Mexico during the Mexican Revolution. The Pancho Villa Expedition under Brigadier General John J. Pershing attempted to capture Pancho Villa, a Mexican who had mounted attacks on U.S. border towns. The skirmishes on the border later became known as the Border War (1910–19).

=== World War I ===
A combined conscript and volunteer force, the National Army, was formed by the United States War Department in 1917 to fight in World War I. The National Army was formed from the old core of the regular United States Army, augmented by units of the United States National Guard and a large draft of able-bodied men. Moral standards, and the morale of the troops, was the concern of the Commission on Training Camp Activities.

The Selective Service Act of 1917 established the broad outlines of the Army's structure. There were to be three increments:

1. The Regular Army, to be raised immediately to the full wartime strength of 286,000 authorized in the National Defense Act of 1916;
2. The National Guard, also to be expanded immediately to the authorized strength of approximately 450,000; and
3. A National Army (the National Defense Act had called it a Volunteer Army), to be created in two increments of 500,000 men each at such time as the President should determine.

Much of the identity of these three segments eventually would be lost as recruits and draftees alike were absorbed in all units, so that in mid-1918 the War Department would change the designation of all land forces to one "United States Army." The original segment to which regiments, brigades, and divisions belonged nevertheless remained apparent from numerical designations. For the Regular Army, for example, divisions were numbered up to 25, while numbers 26 through 49 were reserved for the National Guard and 50 through higher numbers for divisions of the National Army.

At its greatest size the National Army had more than six million men, two million of whom fought on the western front. Promotions within the National Army were quick, with most United States Army officers receiving double and triple promotions within a space of only two years. For example, Dwight D. Eisenhower entered the National Army as a captain and was a lieutenant colonel one year later. Douglas MacArthur also advanced quickly in the National Army, rising from major to brigadier general in two years.

The Army entered World War I with very large divisions, often numbering more than 30,000 men (the 4th Division contained 32,000, for example) and consisting of two infantry brigades of two regiments each, with a total of sixteen infantry battalions per division. Each division also had three artillery regiments and an engineer regiment.

The United States joined World War I in April 1917. Because of the necessary period of training before the units were moved overseas, the first elements of the American Expeditionary Forces arrived in June 1917. Their first actions of the Western Front came in October 1917. U.S. troops contributed to the offensive that finally broke through the German lines. With the armistice on 11 November 1918, the Army once again decreased its forces.

=== Interwar period ===
The National Army was disbanded in 1920 and all personnel not subject to demobilization who had held ranks in the National Army were reverted to Regular Army status. George S. Patton, who had been a colonel in the National Army, returned to the Regular Army as a captain. Some, such as Douglas MacArthur, maintained their wartime rank in the Regular Army. For those keeping their wartime ranks the reality was, however, that they would usually remain at that specific rank for years. This often resulted in talented officers leaving service in the interwar years.

After establishing post-World War I divisions, the Army experienced a prolonged period of stagnation and deterioration. The National Defense Act of 1920 authorized a Regular Army of 296,000 men, but Congress gradually backed away from that number. As with the Regular Army, the National Guard never recruited its authorized 486,000 men, and the Organized Reserves became merely a pool of reserve officers. The root of the Army's problem was money. Congress yearly appropriated only about half the funds that the General Staff requested. Impoverished in manpower and funds, infantry and cavalry divisions dwindled to skeletal organizations.

Between 1923 and 1939 divisions gradually declined as fighting organizations. After Regular Army divisions moved to permanent posts, the War Department modified command relationships between divisional units and the corps areas, making division and brigade commanders responsible only for unit training. They were limited to two visits per year to their assigned elements – and that only if corps area commanders made funds available. Later, as a further economy move, the War Department reduced the number of command visits to one per year, a restriction that effectively destroyed the possibility of training units as combined arms teams.

=== World War II ===
After conscription was instituted in 1940, the Army began to receive the personnel it needed. However, there were equipment shortages as well as inadequate housing and training facilities for the troops. In one year, the Army expanded from five understrength divisions to twenty-two divisions.

The United States entered the war after the Japanese attack on Pearl Harbor in December 1941. During World War II, the Army of the United States was formed as a successor to the National Army. The Army of the United States operated on the same principles as its predecessor, combining Regular Army, National Guard, and conscript forces into one fighting unit. The Army of the United States also incorporated Reserve forces. The reorganized army doubled in size between the invasion of Poland and the attack on Pearl Harbor, and grew forty-four times between the US entry into the war and the surrender of Japan.

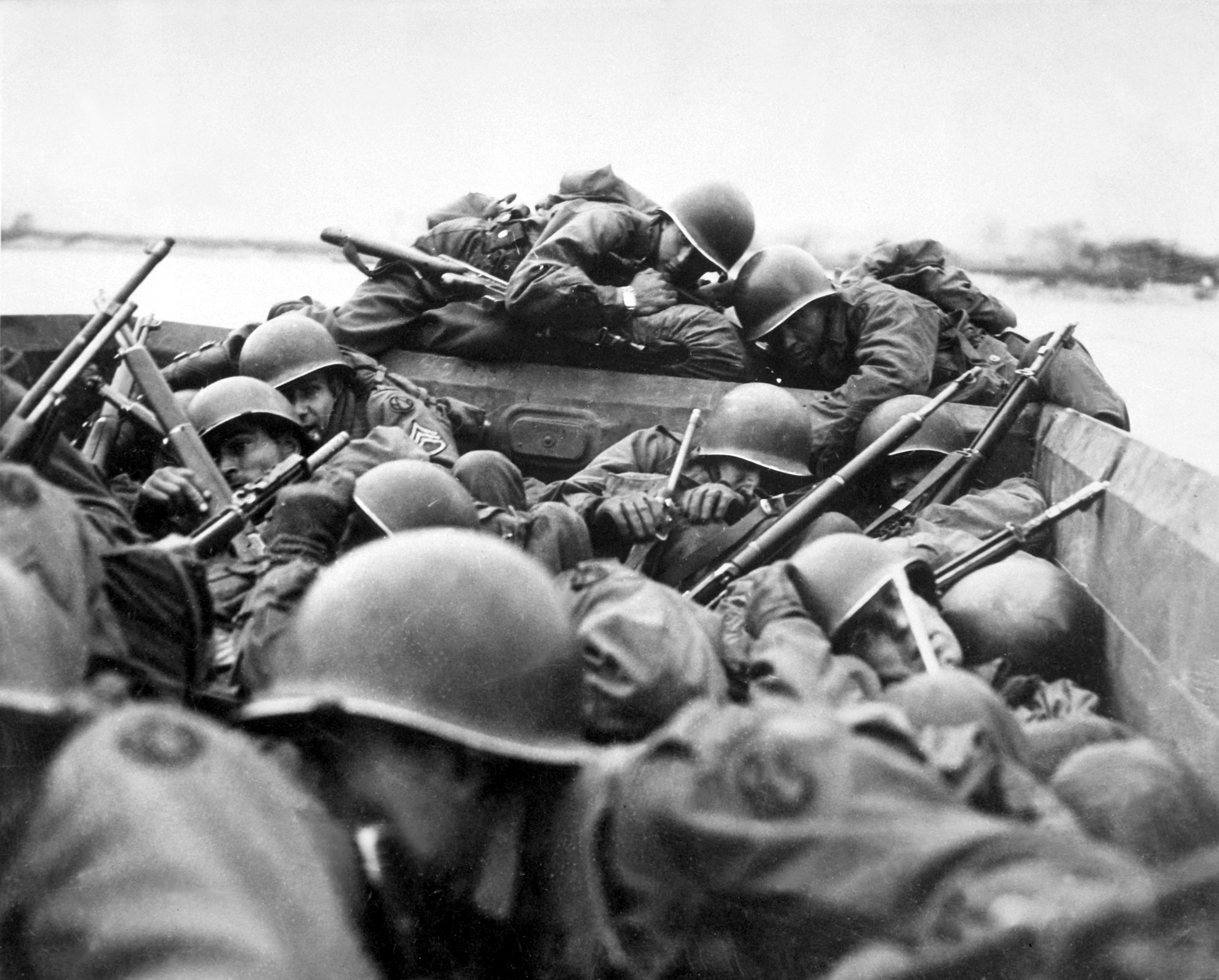
Soldiers from the 89th Infantry Division cross the River Rhine in assault boats, March 1945

The U.S. Army fought World War II with more flexible divisions, consisting of three infantry regiments of three infantry battalions each. Most soldiers' time was spent in training in the United States, with large numbers only going overseas in 1944.

In the Pacific, Army soldiers participated alongside the U.S. Marine Corps in the "island hopping" campaign that wrested the Pacific Islands from Japanese control. On the European front, U.S. Army troops formed a significant portion of the forces that captured North Africa and Sicily and later fought in Italy. On D-Day, 6 June 1944, and in the subsequent liberation of Europe and defeat of Nazi Germany, millions of U.S. Army troops played a central role. Following the Axis surrenders in May (Germany) and August (Japan) of 1945, Army troops were deployed in Germany and to Japan to occupy the two defeated nations.

The United States Army Air Forces, which was an outgrowth of the earlier Army Air Corps, had been virtually independent during the war. In 1947, it separated from the Army to become the United States Air Force.

Shortly after the war, in 1948, the Women's Armed Services Integration Act gave women permanent status in the Regular and Reserve forces of the Army.

=== Cold War ===
The end of World War II set the stage for the East-West confrontation known as the Cold War, which lasted for the next 45 years. With the outbreak of the Korean War, concerns over the defense of Western Europe rose. Two corps, V and VII, were reactivated under Seventh United States Army in 1950 and American strength in Europe rose from one division to four. Hundreds of thousands of U.S. troops remained stationed in West Germany, with others in Belgium, the Netherlands and the United Kingdom, until the 1990s in anticipation of a possible Soviet attack.

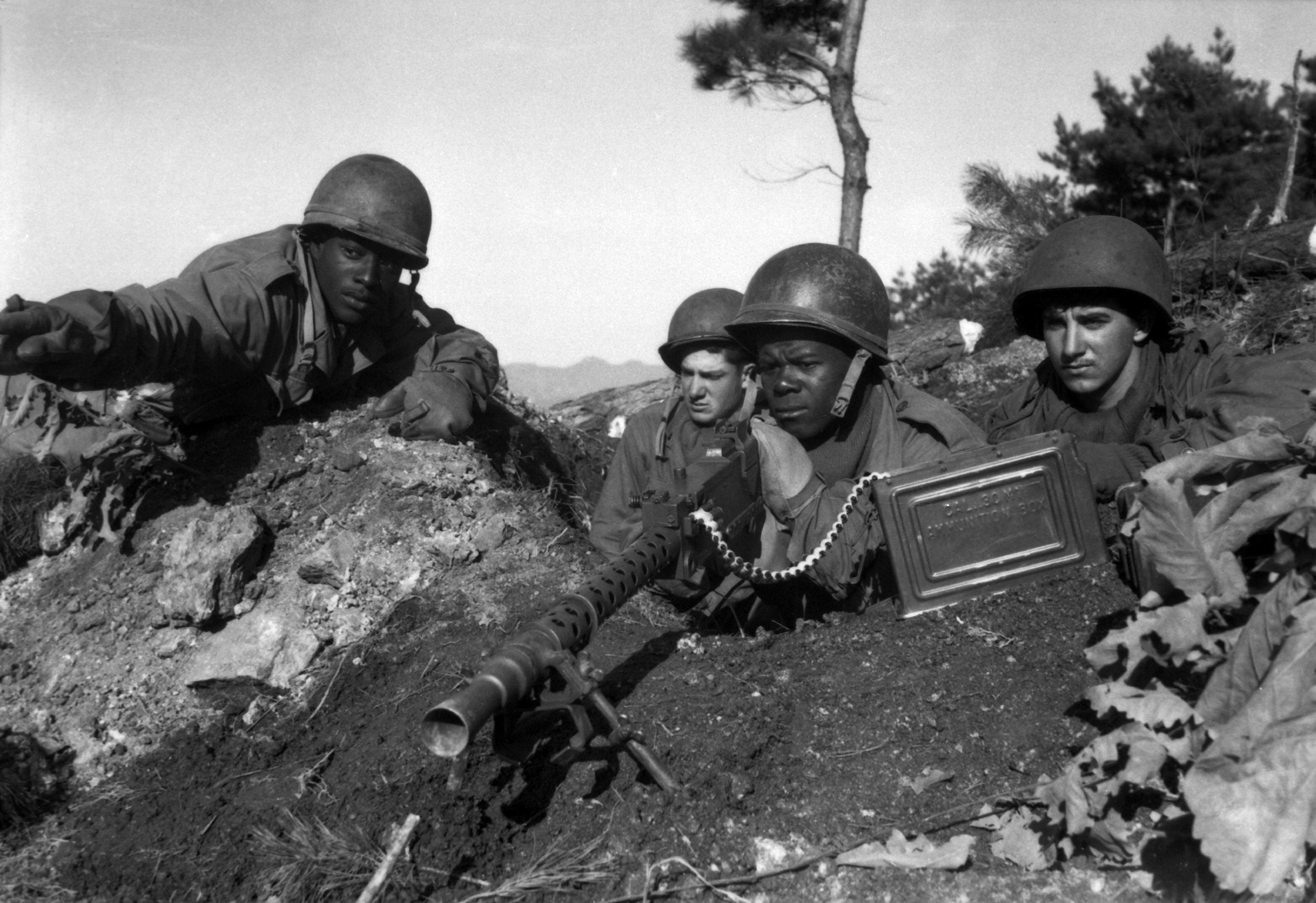
Soldiers of the 2nd Infantry Division man a machine gun during the Korean War

During the Cold War, American troops and their allies fought Communist forces in Korea and Vietnam (see Domino Theory). The Korean War began in 1950, when the Soviets walked out of a U.N. Security Council meeting, removing their possible veto. Under a United Nations umbrella, hundreds of thousands of U.S. troops fought to prevent the takeover of South Korea by North Korea, and later, to invade the northern nation. After repeated advances and retreats by both sides, and the PRC People's Volunteer Army entry into the war, the Korean Armistice Agreement ended the war and returned the peninsula to the status quo in 1953.

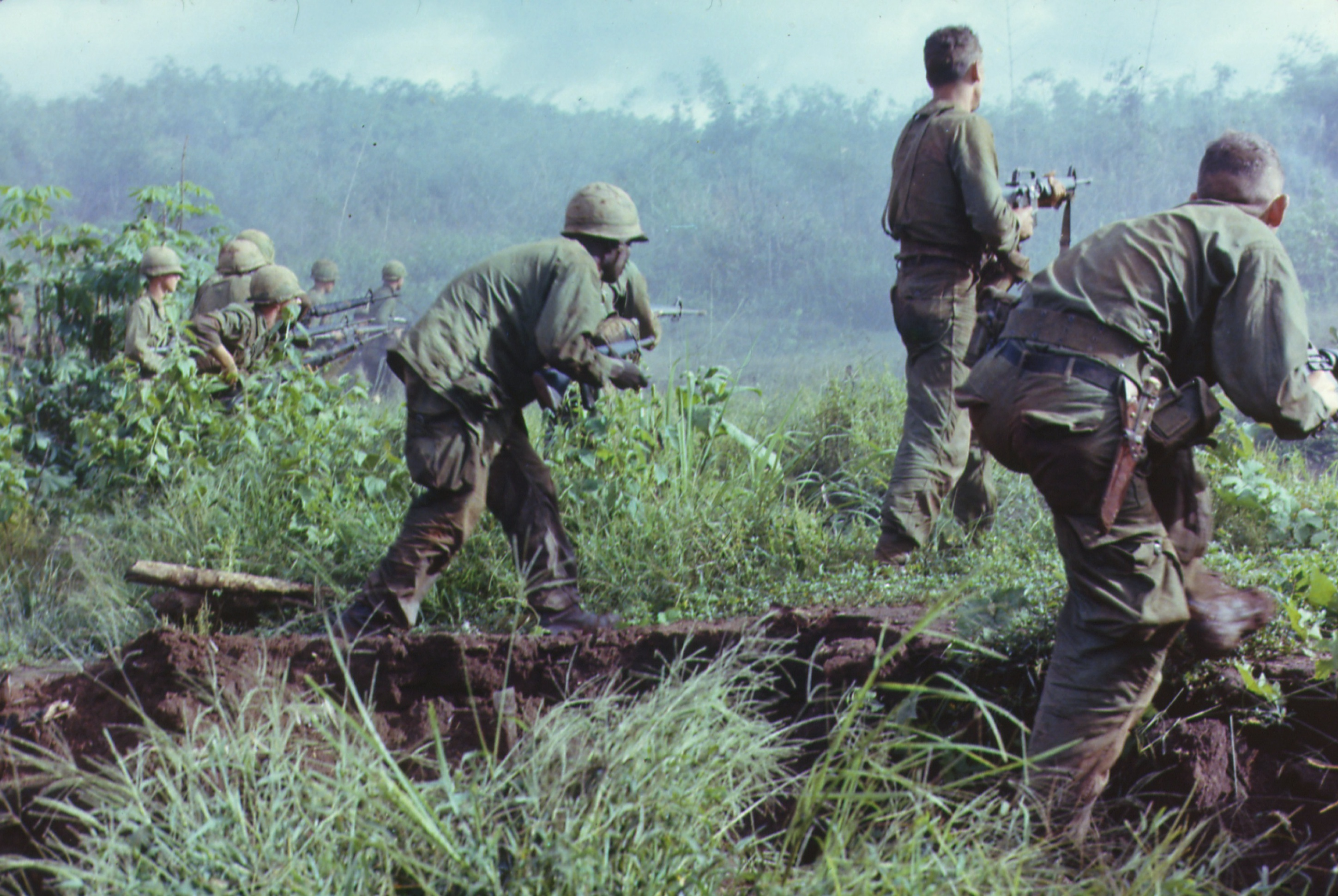
An infantry patrol moves up to assault the last Viet Cong position at Dak To, South Vietnam after an attempted overrun of the artillery position by the Viet Cong during Operation Hawthorne

During the 1950s, the Pentomic reorganization shifted the basic tactical unit from the regiment to the five-company battle group. Armored divisions did not change during the Pentomic era. Instead of brigades, an armored division had three Combat Commands designated: CCA, CCB, and CCC.

On 16 December 1960, the Army Chief of Staff directed a reappraisal of division organization. Resulting studies were carried out between January and April 1961, and fully implemented by 1965. The resulting Reorganization of Army Divisions (ROAD) program shifted all types of divisions (Mechanized, Airborne, Armor, Infantry and Cavalry) to an identical structure of three brigades of three (sometimes four) battalions. The ROAD division consisted of a mix of nine to twelve armor and infantry battalions assigned to the division to meet the expected needs of the division based on its Mission, the likely Enemy, the Terrain/weather, and other forces available or Troops (METT). Each brigade would be assigned or attached the mix of battalions and companies based on the division commanders estimate based on METT.

As operations continued, the division commander could task organize subordinate units as needed by the flow of the battle. The 1st Air Cavalry in Vietnam had nine battalions spread as needed between the three brigade headquarters, but often moved the equivalent of one battalion each day by airlift from one side of the battlefield to the other. An infantry battalion commander in 1st Infantry Division in Vietnam could expect having the number of companies under his command change at least once a day, with companies from different divisions not uncommon. In the "Heavy" divisions in Europe, a tank or infantry company could find itself moved to other battalions more than once a week, and to another brigade as needed.

==== Vietnam ====
The Vietnam War is often regarded as a low point in the Army's record due to the extensive use of drafted enlisted personnel versus mobilization of Army Reserve and Army National Guard personnel, the unpopularity of the war with the American public, and frustrating restrictions placed on the Army by U.S. political leaders (i.e., no invasion of communist-held North Vietnam). While American forces had been stationed in the Republic of Vietnam since 1959, in intelligence and advisory/training roles, they did not deploy in large numbers until 1965, after the Gulf of Tonkin Incident. American forces effectively established and maintained control of the "traditional" battlefield, however they struggled to counter the guerrilla hit and run tactics of the communist Viet Cong and the North Vietnamese Army. For instance in the Tet Offensive in 1968, the U.S. Army turned a large scale attack by communist forces into a massive defeat of the Viet Cong on the battlefield (though at the time the offensive sapped the political will of the American public) which permanently weakened the guerrilla force. Thereafter, most large scale engagements were fought with the regular North Vietnamese Army. In 1973 domestic political opposition to the war finally forced a U.S. withdrawal. In 1975, Vietnam was unified under a communist government.

Scholars such as Andrew Krepenivich, with his book The Army and Vietnam have shown deep skepticism that the U.S. Army could change its firepower-heavy, regular, mass orientation towards the changing of the population's minds necessary for large-scale expeditinoary liberal-democratic counter-insurgency. The Army's lack of flexibility has been highlighted by remarks such as that attributed to a U.S. general: "I will be damned if I will permit the U.S. Army, its institutions, its doctrine, and its traditions to be destroyed just to win this lousy war." The Army was happier to lose a counter-insurgency war than to adapt itself.

During the 1960s the Department of Defense continued to scrutinize the reserve forces and to question the number of divisions and brigades as well as the redundancy of maintaining two reserve components, the Army National Guard and the Army Reserve. In 1967 Secretary of Defense Robert McNamara decided that 15 combat divisions in the Army National Guard were unnecessary and cut the number to 8 divisions (1 mechanized infantry, 2 armored, and 5 infantry), but increased the number of brigades from 7 to 18 (1 airborne, 1 armored, 2 mechanized infantry, and 14 infantry). The loss of the divisions did not set well with the states. Their objections included the inadequate maneuver element mix for those that remained and the end to the practice of rotating divisional commands among the states that supported them. Under the proposal, the remaining division commanders were to reside in the state of the division base. No reduction, however, in total Army National Guard strength was to take place, which convinced the governors to accept the plan. The states reorganized their forces accordingly between 1 December 1967 and 1 May 1968.

=== Post Vietnam War ===
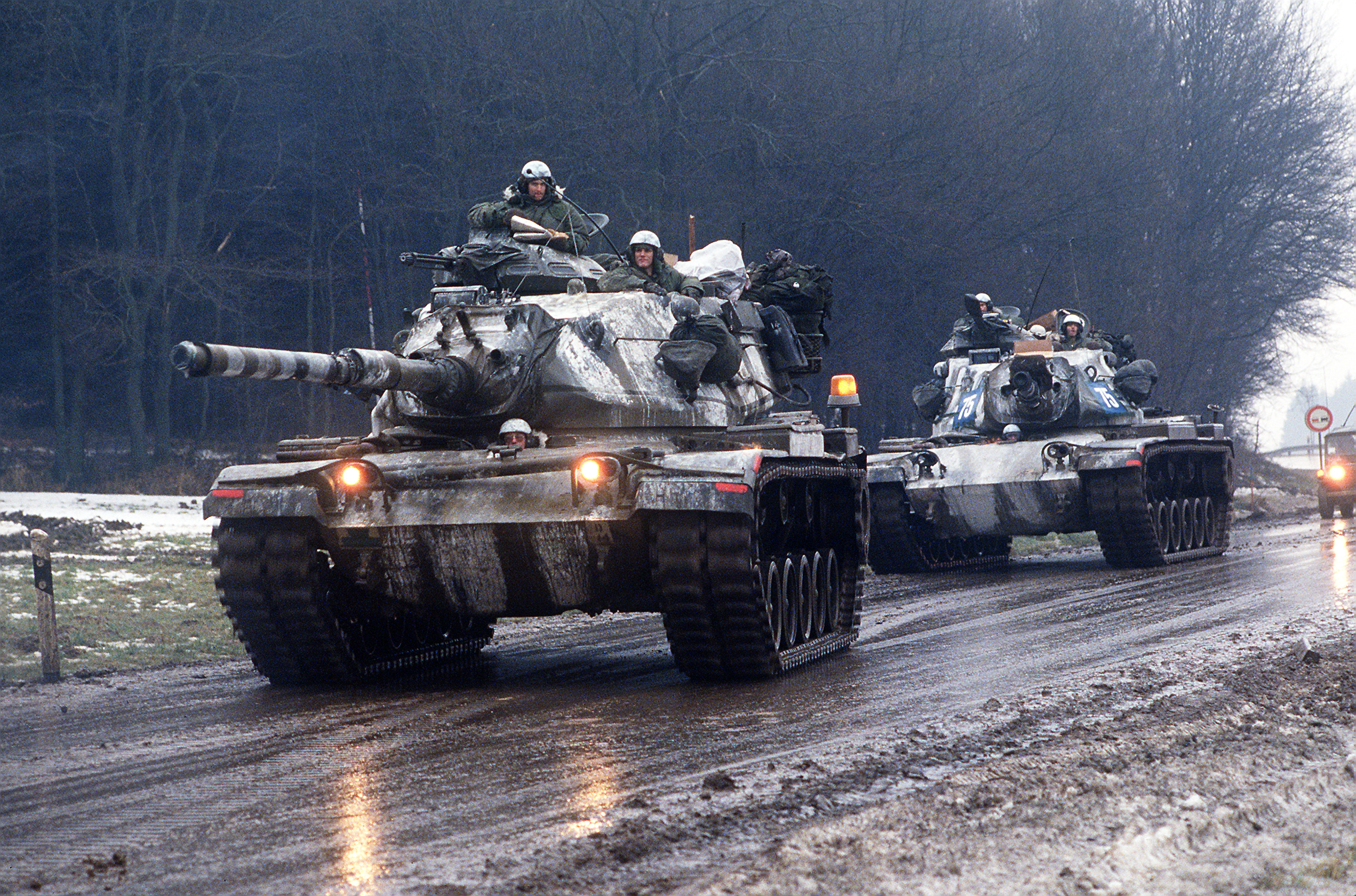
Two M-60A3 tanks in Germany during Exercise Reforger 85

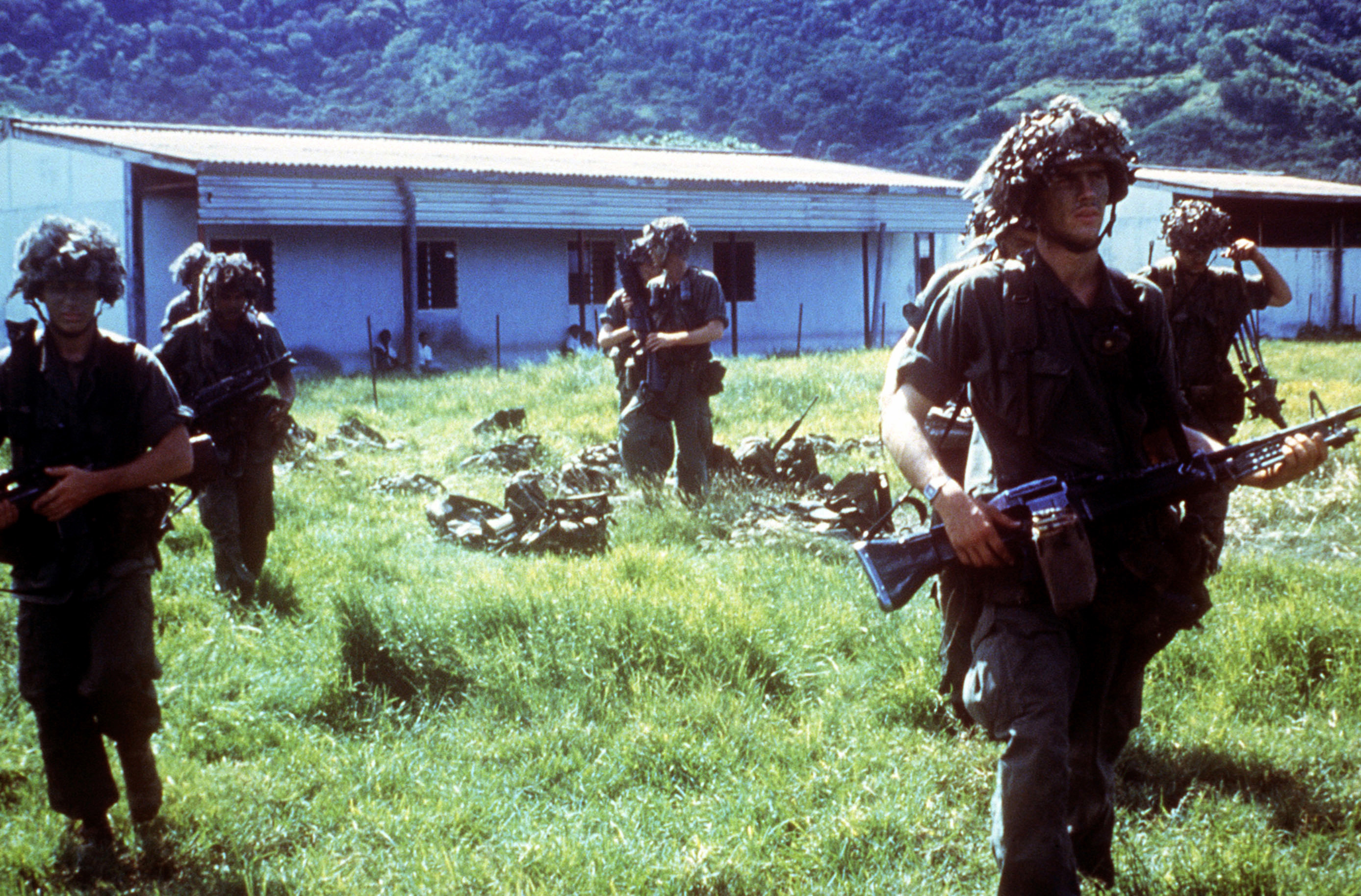
82nd Airborne Division soldiers in Grenada during Operation Urgent Fury.

A "Total Force Policy" was adopted by Chief of Staff of the Army General Creighton Abrams in the aftermath of the Vietnam War and involved treating the three components of the Army – the Regular Army, the Army National Guard and the Army Reserve as a single force.

Training and Doctrine Command was established as a major U.S. Army command on 1 July 1973. The new command, along with the U.S. Army Forces Command (FORSCOM), was created from the Continental Army Command (CONARC) located at Fort Monroe, Virginia. That action was the major innovation in the Army's post-Vietnam reorganization, born of the realization that CONARC's obligations and span of control were too broad for efficient focus. The new organization functionally realigned the major Army commands in the continental United States. CONARC, and Headquarters, as well as U.S. Army Combat Developments Command (CDC), situated at Fort Belvoir, Virginia, were discontinued, with TRADOC and FORSCOM at Fort Belvoir assuming the realigned missions. TRADOC assumed the doctrine development mission from CDC and took over the individual training mission formerly the responsibility of CONARC. The new command also assumed control from CONARC of the major Army installations in the United States housing Army training centers and branch schools. FORSCOM assumed CONARC's operational responsibility for the command and readiness of all divisions and corps in the continental U.S. and for the installations where they were based.

The 1980s was mostly a decade of reorganization. The Army converted to an all-volunteer force with greater emphasis on training and technology. The Goldwater–Nichols Act of 1986 created Unified Combatant Commands, bringing the Army together with the other three military branches under unified, geographically-organized command structures. The Army also played a role in the invasions of Grenada in 1983 (Operation Urgent Fury) and Panama in 1989 (Operation Just Cause).

By 1989, Germany was nearing reunification and the Cold War was coming to a close. Army leadership reacted by starting to plan for a reduction in strength. By November 1989, Pentagon briefers were laying out plans for Operation Quicksilver, a plan to reduce Army endstrength by 23%, from 750,000 to 580,000. A number of incentives were used to accomplish this reduction, including early retirement.

=== Force Structure 1989 ===
The Active Army Force Structure in 1989 at the end of the Cold War was:

- United States Army Forces Command (FORSCOM), at Fort Bragg (NC)
  - I Corps, at Fort Lewis (Washington (state))
    - 7th Infantry Division (Light), at Fort Ord (CA)
    - 9th Infantry Division (Motorized)^{Note 1}, at Fort Lewis (WA)
  - III Corps, at Fort Hood (TX); NATO Northern Army Group (NORTHAG) REFORGER corps
    - 1st Cavalry Division, organized as an armored division;^{Note 1}, at Fort Hood (TX); REFORGER unit with POMCUS depots at Grobbendonk and Zutendaal (Belgium), and Brunssum and Eygelshoven (Netherlands)
    - 2nd Armored Division (-), at Fort Hood (TX); REFORGER unit with POMCUS depots in Mönchengladbach and Straelen (GER)
    - 5th Infantry Division (Mechanized)^{Note 1}, at Fort Polk (LA); REFORGER unit with POMCUS depots in Ter Apel, Coevorden and Vriezenveen (Netherlands)
    - 3rd Armored Cavalry Regiment, at Fort Bliss (TX); REFORGER unit with POMCUS depots in Mönchengladbach (GER)
  - XVIII Airborne Corps, at Fort Bragg (NC)
    - 82nd Airborne Division, at Fort Bragg (NC)
    - 101st Airborne Division (Air Assault), at Fort Campbell (KY)
    - 10th Mountain Division (Light)^{Note 1}, at Fort Drum (NY)
    - 24th Infantry Division (Mechanized)^{Note 1}, at Fort Stewart (GA)
  - 1st Infantry Division (Mechanized) (-), at Fort Riley (KS); VII Corps REFORGER unit with POMCUS depots in Mannheim (GER)
  - 4th Infantry Division (Mechanized), at Fort Carson (CO); V Corps REFORGER unit with POMCUS depots in Kaiserslautern (GER)
  - 6th Infantry Division (Light)^{Note 2}, at Fort Richardson (AK); part of United States Army Alaska, which was assigned to WESTCOM in 1989
  - 194th Armored Brigade, at Fort Knox (KY); V Corps REFORGER unit with POMCUS depots in Pirmasens (GER)
  - 193rd Infantry Brigade, at Fort Clayton (Panama Canal Zone)
  - 197th Infantry Brigade, at Fort Benning (GA); V Corps REFORGER unit with POMCUS depots in Pirmasens (GER)
- United States Army Europe (USAREUR), in Stuttgart (Germany (GER))
  - V Corps, in Frankfurt (GER)
    - 3rd Armored Division, in Frankfurt
    - 8th Infantry Division (Mechanized), in Bad Kreuznach
    - 11th Armored Cavalry Regiment, in Fulda
  - VII Corps, in Stuttgart (GER)
    - 1st Armored Division, in Ansbach
    - 1st Infantry Division (Forward) (3rd Brigade, 1st Infantry Division), in Göppingen
    - 3rd Infantry Division (Mechanized), in Würzburg
    - 2nd Armored Cavalry Regiment, in Nuremberg
  - 2nd Armored Division (Forward) (3rd Brigade, 2nd Armored Division), in Garlstedt
  - Berlin Brigade, in West Berlin
- United States Army Western Command (WESTCOM), at Fort Shafter (HI); part of US Pacific Command, added US Army Alaska in 1989 and US Army, Japan in 1990
  - 25th Infantry Division (Light), at Schofield Barracks (HI)
- Eighth United States Army (EUSA), at Yongsan Garrison (South Korea)
  - 2nd Infantry Division, at Camp Casey (South Korea)
- United States Army Japan/IX Corps, at Camp Zama (Japan)

Note 1: division fielded two active Army and one Army National Guard roundout brigade.
Note 2: division fielded two active Army and one Army Reserve roundout brigade.

Additionally the 177th Armored Brigade acted as Opposing Force (OPFOR) at the National Training Center (NTC) at Fort Irwin in California. The Army National Guard fielded six infantry, two mechanized, and two armored divisions for a total of ten National Guard divisions, as well as 18 separate combat brigades (11x infantry, 3x armored, 4x mechanized) and three armored cavalry regiments. The Army Reserve fielded one mechanized and two infantry brigades.

=== 1990s ===
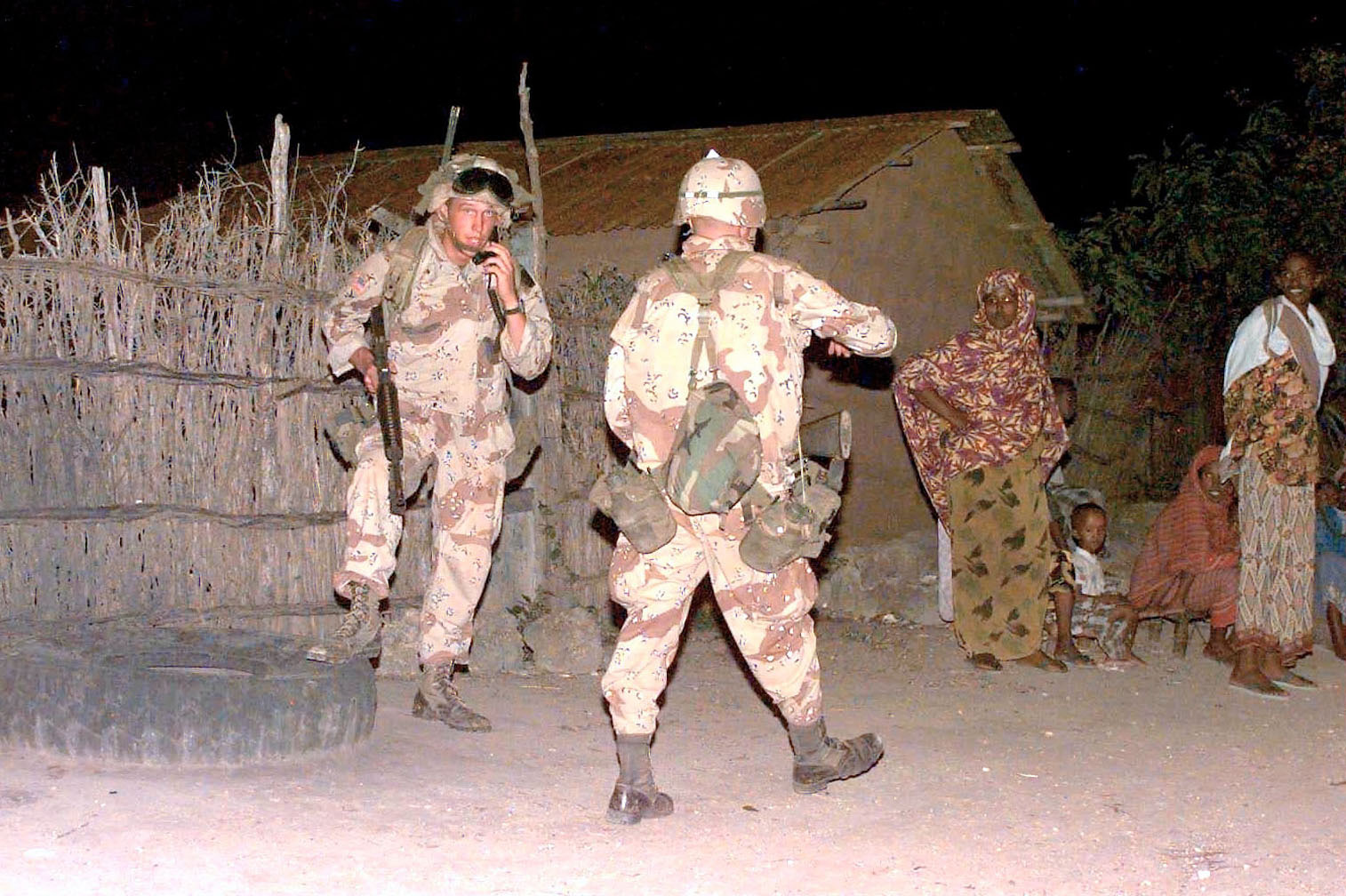
10th Mountain Division soldiers during a nighttime sweep of a Somali village in 1993

In 1990, Iraq invaded its smaller neighbor, Kuwait, and U.S. land forces, led by the 82nd Airborne Division, quickly deployed to assure the protection of Saudi Arabia. In January 1991, Operation Desert Storm commenced, and a U.S.-led coalition deployed over 500,000 troops, the bulk of them from U.S. Army formations, to drive out Iraqi forces. The campaign ended in a victory for coalition forces, swiftly routing an Iraqi Army organized along Soviet lines in just one hundred hours.

Later in 1991 the Soviet Union was dissolved, effectively ending the Cold War.

After Desert Storm the Army did not see major combat operations for the remainder of the 1990s. Army units did participate in a number of peacekeeping activities, such as the UN peacekeeping mission in Somalia in 1993, where the abortive Operation Gothic Serpent led to the deaths of eighteen American soldiers and the withdrawal of international forces. The Army also contributed troops to NATO peacekeeping forces in the Yugoslav Wars from December 1995, initially with the Implementation Force during the Bosnian War. U.S. Army forces only left Bosnia and Herzegovina in 2004 with the disestablishment of Task Force Eagle on November 24, 2004. U.S. Army troops remain in Kosovo with the Kosovo Force.

During the first half of the decade the Army deactivated 8 of its 18 active divisions:

- 9th Infantry Division (Motorized) in 1991
- 3d Armored Division in 1992
- 5th Infantry Division (Mechanized) in 1992
- 8th Infantry Division (Mechanized) in 1992
- 6th Infantry Division (Light) in 1994
- 7th Infantry Division (Light) in 1994
- 2d Armored Division in 1995
- 24th Infantry Division (Mechanized) in 1996

as well as two of its ten National Guard divisions:

- 50th Armored Division in 1993
- 26th Infantry Division (Light) in 1993

Plans to convert two Army National Guard divisions to cadre formations were rejected by Congress in 1992.

During the mid-late 1990s, the Army trialled Force XXI. One of its initiatives was Task Force 21 (also called Task Force XXI), a battlefield digitized brigade formed for the Advanced Warfighting Exercises in 1997 to test Force XXI concepts, technology, and tactics. The brigade was formed from the 4th Infantry Division (which replaced the deactivated 2d Armored Division in 1992) and the 1st Cavalry Division as early as 1992, with some field testing beginning at Fort Hood in late 1992, early 1993. The 4th Infantry Division units assigned were 3–66 Armor and 1–22 Infantry, both of the 3d Brigade, while 1st Cavalry Division drew soldiers across a variety of support and combat fields.

Technologies tested included Software-defined radios, Applique computers, Ground Surveillance Radar, Satellite radio email systems, and Advanced UAV technology. TF-XXI participated in various Advanced Warfighting Exercises, including WARRIOR FOCUS (1995 #4).

== Twenty-first century ==
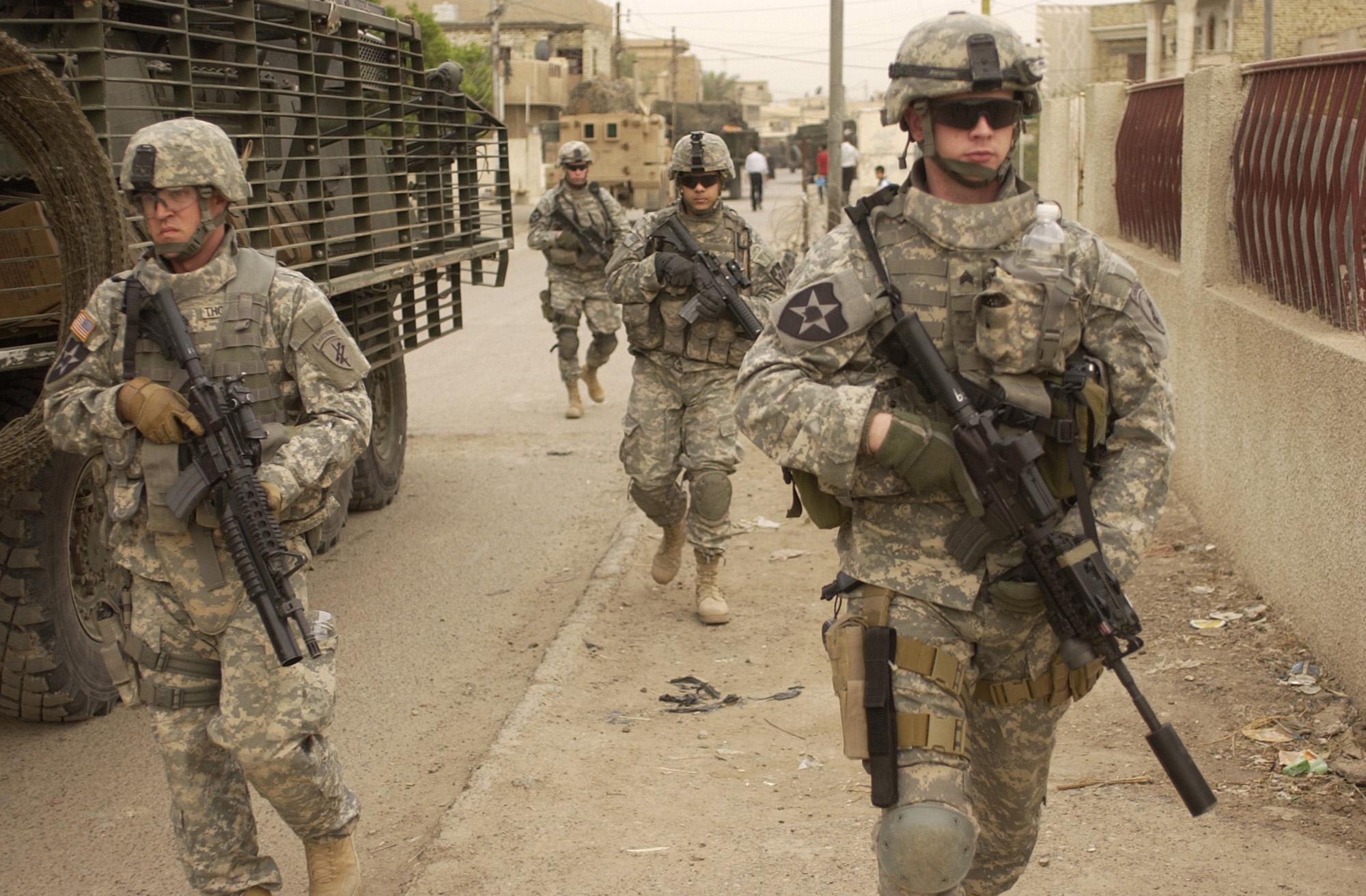
Soldiers from the 3rd Stryker Brigade Combat Team, 2nd Infantry Division patrolling Dora, Baghdad in Iraq during 2007

On 11 September 2001, 53 Army civilians (47 employees and six contractors) and 22 soldiers were among the 125 victims killed in the Pentagon in a terrorist attack when American Airlines Flight 77 commandeered by five Al-Qaeda hijackers slammed into the western side of the building as part of the September 11 attacks. Lieutenant General Timothy Maude was the highest-ranking military official killed at the Pentagon, and the most senior U.S. Army officer killed by foreign action since the death of Lieutenant General Simon Bolivar Buckner Jr. on June 18, 1945, in the Battle of Okinawa during World War II.

In response to the September 11 attacks, U.S. and NATO forces invaded Afghanistan in October 2001, replacing the Taliban government. This began the "war on terror".

The Army took part in the U.S. 2003 invasion of Iraq, supported by the United Kingdom, Poland, and Australia. Within months, the mission changed from conflict between regular forces to counterinsurgency, with large numbers of suicide attacks resulting in the deaths of more than 4,000 U.S. service members (as of March 2008) and injuries to thousands more.

Most of the units that carried out the ground campaign phase of the invasion of Iraq, and who bore the larger part of the conflict with the Iraqi Armed Forces in 2003, were those of the Army. Since then, they have performed numerous operations against insurgents.

The Army has had to make several adjustments to address demands on its personnel and equipment. The US Army has utilized its stop-loss policy and has required more of its combat personnel to serve more tours of duty than before due to the need for experienced personnel. Unlike during the war in Vietnam, there was no involuntary draft of Americans into the Army. Instead, the service employed its Total Force model and mobilized/recalled to active duty numerous Army National Guard and Army Reserve combat arms, combat support, and combat service support units and personnel, often deploying them repeatedly to the Southwest Asia combat zone in a manner similar to their Regular Army counterparts.

As a result of this intense operational tempo, deep concerns arose in the U.S. about the effects of frequent combat deployment on the psychological health of US soldiers in Iraq and Afghanistan. Suicides among US soldiers have been rising, and have reached their highest rate in 26 years. This increase has coincided with US deployments in Afghanistan and Iraq.

During the insurgency, it was found that most Army and Marine Corps vehicles such as HMMWVs were insufficiently armored, leading to efforts to add greater armor to protect against improvised explosive devices. Some soldiers added armor by using modifications known as hillbilly armor. In the short term, HMMWVs in service in Iraq are being replaced by Category 1 MRAP vehicles, primarily the Force Protection Cougar H and the International MaxxPro. The US Marine Corps plans to replace all HMMWVs patrolling "outside the wire" with MRAP vehicles.

The lack of stability in Iraq has led to longer deployments for Regular Army as well as Army Reserve and Army National Guard troops. U.S. troops withdrew in December 2011, but fighting continues. 3,293 US Army personnel were killed in the conflict.

The Army's chief modernization plan was the Future Combat Systems program. Many systems were canceled and the remaining were swept into the BCT modernization program.

== Personnel strength ==
- 1775–1783: 17,000 (Continental Army without militias)
- 1784: 700 (First American Regiment)
- 1793: 5,100 (Legion of the United States)
- 1812: 7,000
- 1815: 35,800
- 1816: 10,000
- 1846: 8,600
- 1848: 32,000
- 1861: 16,400 (Regular Army, before the American Civil War)
- 1865: 1,000,500 (Union Army including volunteer units) (Note: For comparison: The Confederate States Army including militias and volunteer units had its peak in 1863, with a total of 464,600 men.)
- 1869: 39,000
- 1870: 30,000
- 1874: 25,000
- 1898: 25,000
- 1917: 286,000
- 1939: 189,800
- 1945: 8,268,000
- 2017: 460,000
- 2020: 480,900
- 2023: 453,551

Numbers rounded up or down to full thousands or to full hundreds, if more precisely known.

== See also ==
- Military history of the United States
- List of military weapons of the United States
  - History of the United States Navy
  - History of the United States Marine Corps
  - History of the United States Air Force
  - History of the United States Coast Guard
- Organizations which deal with US Army History
  - United States Army Center of Military History
    - Military history detachments
  - Army Historical Foundation
  - U.S. Army Heritage and Education Center
- Other topics
  - U.S. Army Birthdays

== Sources ==
- "Case Reference Guide for Review of Military Records", Military Personnel Records Center, published 2001
- "Army Force Components Training Guide", Military Personnel Records Center, published 2003
- Cincinnatus (1981). Self-Destruction: The Disintegration and Decay of the United States Army During the Vietnam Era. New York, NY: Norton. Author was C.B. Currey.
- Wilson, John B. (1997). Maneuver and Firepower: The Evolution of Divisions and Separate Brigades. Washington, DC: Center of Military History.
- United States Army Service Records (1910–2005), National Personnel Records Center, Overland, Missouri
