= Regular Army (United States) =

Professional core of the US Army

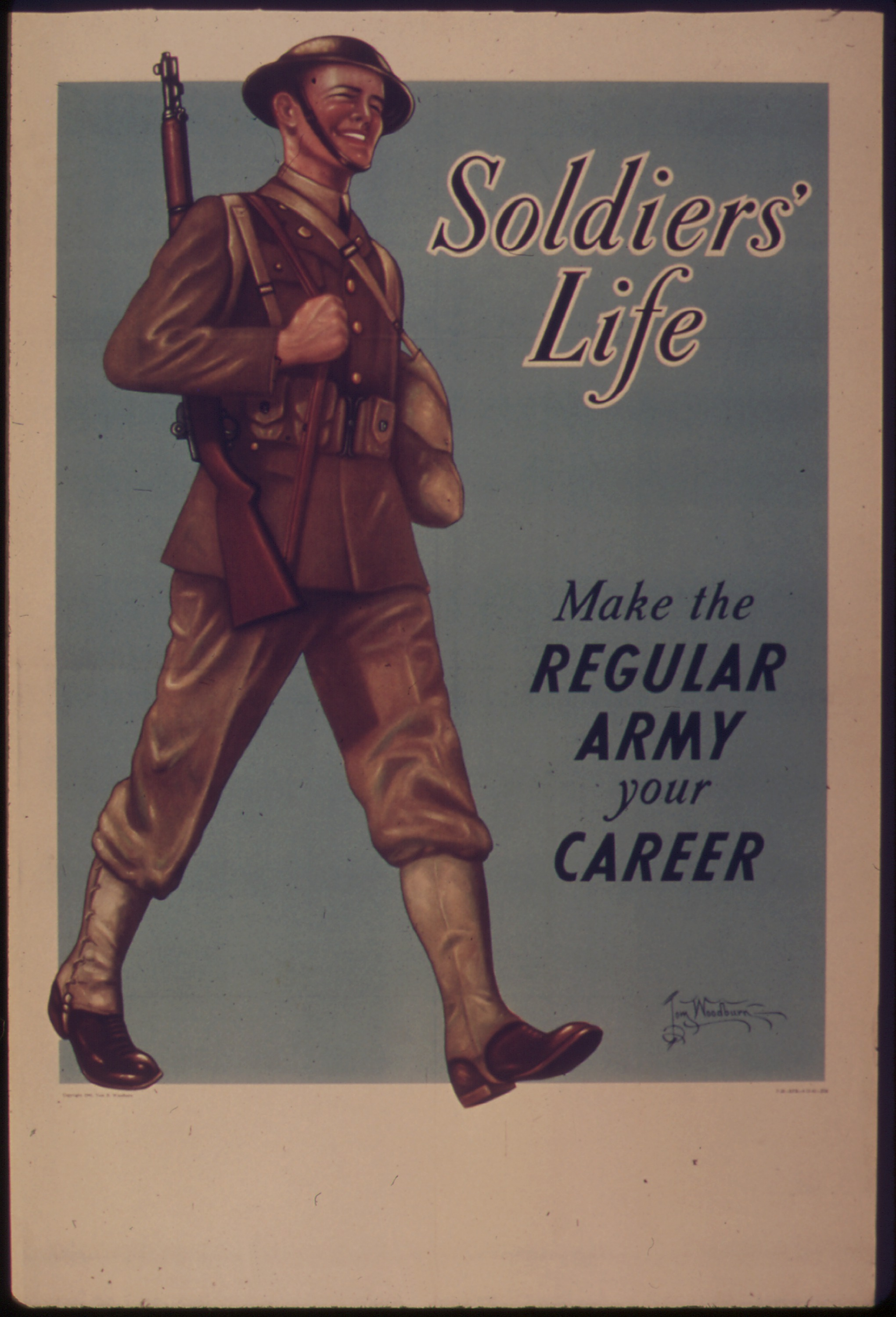
World War II-era poster advertising a career in the Regular Army

The Regular Army of the United States succeeded the Continental Army as the country's permanent, professional land-based military force. In modern times, the professional core of the United States Army continues to be called the Regular Army (often abbreviated as "RA"). From the time of the American Revolution until after the Spanish–American War, state militias and volunteer regiments organized by the states (but thereafter controlled by federal authorities and federal generals in time of war) supported the smaller Regular Army of the United States. These volunteer regiments came to be called United States Volunteers (USV) in contrast to the Regular United States Army (USA). During the American Civil War, about 97 percent of the Union army was United States Volunteers.

In contemporary use, the term Regular Army refers to the full-time active component of the United States Army, as distinguished from the Army Reserve and the Army National Guard. A fourth component, the Army of the United States, has been inactive since the suspension of the draft in 1973 and the U.S. armed forces became an all-volunteer armed force.

The American military system developed from a combination of the professional, national Continental Army, the state militias and volunteer regiments of the American Revolutionary War, and the similar post-Revolutionary War American military units under the Militia Act of 1792. These provided a basis for the United States Army's organization, with only minor changes, until the creation of the modern National Guard in 1903. The Militia Act provided for the use of volunteers who could be used anywhere in time of war, in addition to the State militias who were restricted to local use within their States for short periods of time. Even today's professional United States Army, which is augmented by the Army Reserve and Army National Guard, has a similar system of organization: a permanent, professional core, and additional units which can be mobilized in emergencies or times of war.

== Continental Army ==
The United States Army traces its origin to the founding of the Continental Army on June 14, 1775, when the Continental Congress authorized a one-year enlistment of riflemen from Pennsylvania, Maryland, and Virginia to join the New England militia army besieging Boston. Late in 1776, Congress called for the Continental Army to serve for the duration of the war. The army was to consist of 88 battalions raised and equipped by the states, with officers appointed by the states. Appointment of officers actually continued to be a collaboration between Congress, the Commander in Chief, George Washington, and the states. The number of battalions was to be apportioned to the states according to their populations. While the initial number of battalions approached the authorized strength, by 1 January 1787 the Continental infantry was only able to maintain enough regiments for fifty battalions. During the Revolutionary War, battalions and regiments were essentially the same. By the end of the siege of Yorktown in October 1781, the Continental Army's infantry had grown to 60 battalions.

For varying short periods of time during the war, many state militia units and separate volunteer state regiments (usually organized only for local service) supported the Continental Army. Although training and equipping part-time or short-term soldiers and coordinating them with professionally trained regulars was especially difficult, this approach also enabled the Americans to prevail without having had to establish a large or permanent army.

As the war waned, General Washington sent his plans for a standing army and organized militia to Congress. But due to the inability of Congress to raise much revenue under the Articles of Confederation, suspicion of standing armies, and perceived safety from foreign enemies provided by the Royal Navy's command of the sea, Congress disbanded the Continental Army after the Treaty of Paris, the peace treaty with Great Britain, became effective. Congress retained 80 caretaker soldiers to protect arms and equipment at West Point, New York and Fort Pitt and called on the States to furnish 700 men from their militias for one year of service on the frontier. The delegates to the Constitutional Convention in Philadelphia in 1787 recognized the need for a more permanent military establishment and provided for a national regular army and navy and a militia under state control, subject to civilian control through congressional control of appropriations and presidential leadership as commander in chief of the regular forces and of the militia when called into federal service.

On June 3, 1784, the day after the Continental Army was reduced to 80 men, the Congress established a regiment which was to be raised and officered by obtaining volunteers from the militia of four of the states. This unit, the First American Regiment was commanded until 1 January 1792 by Josiah Harmar of Pennsylvania, gradually turned into a Regular regiment known as the 1st Infantry in 1791, and in 1815 was it redesignated as the 3rd Infantry in the reorganization of the army following the War of 1812. Congress gradually increased the military establishment from 700 men in 1784 to 5,104 in 1793.

== Legion of the United States ==
The United States military realized it needed a well-trained standing army following St. Clair's Defeat on November 4, 1791, when a force led by General Arthur St. Clair was almost entirely wiped out by the Northwestern Confederacy near modern Fort Recovery, Ohio. The plans, which were supported by U.S. president George Washington and Henry Knox, Secretary of War, would lead to the creation of the Legion of the United States. The command would be based on the 18th-century military works of Henry Bouquet, a professional Swiss soldier who served as a colonel in the British Army, and French Marshal Maurice de Saxe.

In 1792 Anthony Wayne, a renowned hero of the American Revolutionary War, was encouraged to leave retirement and return to active service as Commander-in-Chief of the Legion with the rank of major general. The Legion, which was recruited and raised in Pittsburgh, Pennsylvania, was formed around elements of the 1st and 2nd Regiments from St. Clair's army that had fought at the Battle of the Wabash. These units then became the First and Second Sub-Legions. The Third and Fourth Sub-Legions were raised from additional recruits. From June 1792 to November 1792, the Legion remained cantoned at Fort LaFayette in Pittsburgh.

The new command was trained at Legionville, near present-day Baden, Pennsylvania. The base was the first formal basic training facility for the United States military. Throughout the winter of 1792–93, existing troops along with new recruits were drilled in military skills, tactics and discipline. The Legion then went on to fight the Northwest Indian War, a struggle between American Indian tribes affiliated with the Western Confederacy in the area south of the Ohio River. The overwhelmingly successful campaign was concluded with the decisive victory at the Battle of Fallen Timbers on August 20, 1794. The training the Legion received at Legionville was seen as instrumental to this victory.

However, after Wayne's death, Brigadier General James Wilkinson, who was once Wayne's second-in-command of the Legion, began disbanding his former superior's organization in December 1796. His policy was to re-establish a military model based on a regimental system. Wilkinson, who was later found to be a paid agent for the Spanish Crown, tried to rid the US Army of everything Wayne had created. This resulted in the 1st, 2nd, 3rd and 4th Sub-Legions becoming the 1st, 2nd, 3rd and 4th Regiments of the United States Army. Nevertheless, the new regiments honored their foundations:

- Part of the shield in the coat-of-arms of the 1st US Infantry Regiment is red in honor of the 2nd Sub-Legion.
- The Distinctive Unit Insignia worn on the uniform epaulette and beret by the 3rd US Infantry (The Old Guard) show a golden cocked hat with plume. This insignia represents the crest of the Old Guard's coat of arms which shows a black cocked hat with white, which were the colors of the 1st Sub-Legion.
- The coat-of-arms of the 4th US Infantry Regiment is green and white in honor of the 4th Sub-Legion.

In 1808, Congress agreed to the expansion of the Regular Army as a result of deteriorating American relations with Britain. This led to the establishment of the 5th, 6th and 7th Regular infantry regiments, and a Regiment of Riflemen.

== War of 1812 ==
In January 1812, with the possibility of an American war with Britain looming larger, Congress authorized the army to add ten more regiments of infantry, which were to be larger than the existing regiments and authorized the president to call 50,000 militiamen into service, but in June 1812 Congress authorized a total of 25 infantry regiments of equal strength for the Regular Army. All the while the States competed with the Federal government for soldiers with shorter terms of enlistment for their regiments. Congress then directed the creation, in January 1813, of twenty new infantry regiments enlisted for just one year. Nineteen of them were raised. Early in 1814 four more infantry regiments and three more regiments of riflemen were constituted. These 48 regiments of infantry and 4 rifle regiments were the greatest number of infantry units included in the Regular Army until the First World War. Despite this increase in Regular Army units, nine out of ten infantrymen in the War of 1812 were militiamen.

At the end of the war, by an act of March 1815, Congress set the peace establishment of the Regular Army at 10,000 men, divided among 8 infantry regiments, 1 rifle regiment; and a corps of artillery, but no cavalry regiments. In effect, most of the new regiments raised for the War of 1812 were treated as if they were volunteer regiments raised for the duration of the war and disbanded at its end.

== Seminole Wars ==
In 1821 Congress felt safe enough to cut expenses by disbanding the Rifle Regiment and the 8th Infantry and reducing the size of companies to fifty-one enlisted men, the smallest ever. This arrangement endured for fifteen years when the Indians forced an enlargement. A mostly militia force won the Black Hawk War of 1831–1832. However, the Regular Army needed to be increased by 39 men per company plus one infantry regiment and volunteer and militia units had to be used, at least at first, in order to win the Seminole Wars in Florida, which began in December 1835 and lasted until 1842. After the war, the companies were reduced to minimum size but the second regiment of dragoons which had been added to the army was turned into a regiment of riflemen. When they were reconverted to dragoons after a year, the rifle corps disappeared.

== Mexican–American War ==
At the start of the Mexican War, Congress tried to get along with just eight infantry regiments of Regulars, but gave the president power to expand their companies to one hundred enlisted men during the war. After hostilities commenced, Congress had to add nine new regiments with the same organization as the old ones to the Regular infantry. The cavalry of the U.S. Regular Army consisted of two light regiments trained to fight mounted or dismounted and designated as dragoons. Although raised as Regulars, the nine new infantry regiments created during the Mexican War were disbanded when the war was over. By contrast to the army of mainly militiamen who fought the War of 1812, in the Mexican War, one of every ten soldiers was a militiaman, three were Regulars and six were war volunteers. During the Mexican War, some 73,260 volunteers enlisted, although fewer than 30,000 actually served in Mexico.

Congress added two new regiments to the Regular Army in 1855 because of the need to protect the large additional territory obtained from Mexico.

== American Civil War ==
During the American Civil War, the Union Army consisted of a very small contingent of pre-war U.S. Army or "Regular Army" personnel combined with vast numbers of soldiers in state volunteer regiments raised and equipped by the States before being "federalized" and led by general officers appointed by the president of the United States and confirmed by the United States Senate. In many ways, these regiments resembled and might be analogized to the modern day National Guard. Due to their pre-war experience, they were considered by many to be the elite of the Union Army, and during battles regular army units were often held in reserve in case of emergencies.

Officers during the Civil War from the state forces were known by the rank suffix "of volunteers"; if Regular Army, these officers were known by the rank suffix "USA". Thus, a state regiment colonel would be known as "colonel of volunteers" while a Regular Army captain would be known as "Captain, USA". Regular Army officers of the Civil War could accept commissions in volunteer forces and could also be granted brevet ranks (higher ranks than the permanent commission). In some cases, officers held as many as four ranks: a permanent rank (called "full rank") in the Regular Army, a full rank in the volunteers, and brevet ranks in both as a result of battlefield promotion, meritorious service or congressional action. The officers typically would only refer to themselves by the highest rank they held. An example is Union Army officer James Henry Carleton who was a "full" captain, a brevet major in the regular army, a colonel of volunteers, and a brevet brigadier general.

After the Civil War ended in 1865, the term Regular Army was used to denote an officer's permanent rank only when a brevet commission had also been received. Such was the case with George Custer who was a brevet major general of volunteers and a brevet Regular Army brigadier general while holding the permanent rank of lieutenant colonel in the Regular Army. If no brevet rank was held, the officer was simply referred to by his permanent rank and the suffix "USA". Enlisted personnel could not hold brevet ranks and were all considered simply as United States Army personnel.

The Confederate Army had its own version of the Regular Army, known as the "Army of the Confederate States of America" or the "ACSA". The ACSA was considered the professional military while, as in the Union Army, the Confederacy mustered massive numbers of state volunteers into the "Provisional Army of the Confederate States" or the "PACS". Nearly all Confederate enlisted personnel were PACS while most senior general officers held dual commissions in the ACSA and PACS. Thomas "Stonewall" Jackson, for instance, was a lieutenant general in the PACS while holding the permanent rank of major of artillery in the ACSA. The ACSA concept was also used to ensure that none of the senior Confederate officers could ever be outranked by militia officers, considered subordinate to the PACS.

== World War I ==
During World War I, with the founding of the National Army, the term Regular Army was used to describe a person's peacetime rank in contrast to the commissions offered to fight in the First World War. The Regular Army, as an actual U.S. Army component, was reorganized by the National Defense Act of 1920 (amending the National Defense Act of 1916), when the large draft force of the National Army was demobilized and disbanded. The remaining Army force was formed into the peacetime Regular Army (which included inactive units in the Regular Army Inactive [RAI]), augmented by the Organized Reserve (created by combining the Officer Reserve Corps (ORC) and the Enlisted Reserve Corps (ERC) authorized by the 1916 act), predecessor to the United States Army Reserve.

== Interwar years ==
During the 1920s and 1930s, the Regular Army was badly underfunded and ranked 16th in the world. Promotions within the Regular Army were also very slow. Commissioned officers could easily spend 10 to 15 years in the junior grades. Enlisted personnel routinely served nine years (three full three-year enlistments) before reaching the rank of corporal. Dwight Eisenhower, for instance, spent sixteen years as a major before being promoted to lieutenant colonel in 1936.

== World War II ==
During World War II, the Regular Army served as a corps of professionals who helped form the initial leadership of the Army of the United States. Regular Army officers would sometimes hold two ranks: a permanent rank in the Regular Army and a temporary rank in the Army of the United States. Promotions within the Army of the United States were also very rapid and some officers were known to hold the permanent Regular Army rank of captain, for instance, while serving as a colonel in the Army of the United States. The Army of the United States rank could also be revoked (sometimes known as "loss of theater rank") meaning that an officer would revert to Regular Army rank and, in effect, be demoted.

Enlisted personnel did not hold dual ranks; rather, they were soldiers either in the Regular Army or the Army of the United States. To be a Regular Army soldier was also seen as a point of honor because they had voluntarily enlisted rather than being drafted.

== Post-war years ==
After the demobilization of the Army of the United States in 1946, the United States Army was divided into the Regular Army (RA) and the Army Reserve (USAR). During the Korean War, the Army of the United States was reinstated but had only enlisted draftees. Officers after this point held Regular Army rank only, but could hold an additional "temporary" rank in addition to their permanent rank. Temporary Regular Army ranks were not as easily revoked as the former AUS ranks.

Since the Vietnam War, officers' permanent rank is their RA rank. Active duty officers can hold an RA commission and rank and may also hold a higher rank with a USAR commission. Reserve officers hold only a USAR commission, but may serve in either the reserve component or on active duty. That is, all non-permanent ranks (including ally mutual rank, temporary rank, battlefield promotions, etc.) are handled through USAR commissions. Those officers without RA commissions do not have a permanent rank. Enlisted ranks are all permanent RA ranks.

After Vietnam, most Reserve Officers' Training Corps (ROTC) and Officer Candidate School (OCS) graduates, and those receiving direct commissions were commissioned as RA, US Army Reserve (USAR), or into the Army National Guard of the United States (ARNG). USAR officers could be assessed into the basic USAR component; that is, officers who served one weekend a month and two weeks a year for training, or as an Other Than Regular Army (OTRA) officer. RA and OTRA officers were those who came on active duty and were expected to serve their full commission service obligation or until retirement. At promotion to major, OTRA officers had the option of requesting integration into the RA or remaining OTRA. If not selected for promotion to lieutenant colonel, OTRA majors were required to retire at 20 years unless the Secretary of the Army authorized further service as part of the Voluntary Indefinite (VOLINDEF) program. In the late 1990s, as part of a series of officer management regulatory changes, upon promotion to major all OTRA officers were required to integrate into the RA or exit service within 90 days. Recently, OTRA is rarely used with virtually all new officers being commissioned RA, USAR, or into the National Guard as appropriate.

After the abolition of the draft, the Regular Army became the primary component of the United States Army, augmented by the Army Reserve and Army National Guard of the United States. In the early 1980s, the use of temporary Regular Army ranks was suspended.

Since passage of the 2005 National Defense Authorization Act (NDAA), all active duty officers are commissioned in the Regular Army. Eligible commissioned officers serving on active duty were automatically converted to RA on/or after Veteran's Day, 11 November 2005.

== Bibliography ==
- Carney, Stephen A., The Occupation of Mexico, May 1846 – July 1848. CMH PUB 73-3, U.S. Army Center of Military History, U.S. Government Printing Office, Washington, D.C., Last updated 23 May 2006. ISBN 0-16-075744-4. Retrieved September 28, 2010.
- Hogan, Jr., David W., U.S. Army Center of Military History, Centuries of Service, The U.S. Army, 1775–2004, pamphlet, Center of Military History, United States Army, Washington, D.C., 2004, CMH Pub 70–71–1. Retrieved September 28, 2010.
- Mahon, John K. and Danysh, Romana, Infantry Part I: Regular Army. Office of the Chief of Military History, United States Army, Washington, D.C.,1972, LCCN 74-610219. Retrieved September 28, 2010.
- Wright, Jr., Robert K. and MacGregor, Jr., Morris J., Soldier-Statesmen of the Constitution, Center of Military History, United States Army, Washington, D.C., 1987, First Printing-CMH Pub 71-25. Retrieved September 28, 2010.
