= Legionville =

- U.S. National Register of Historic Places
- Pennsylvania state historical marker
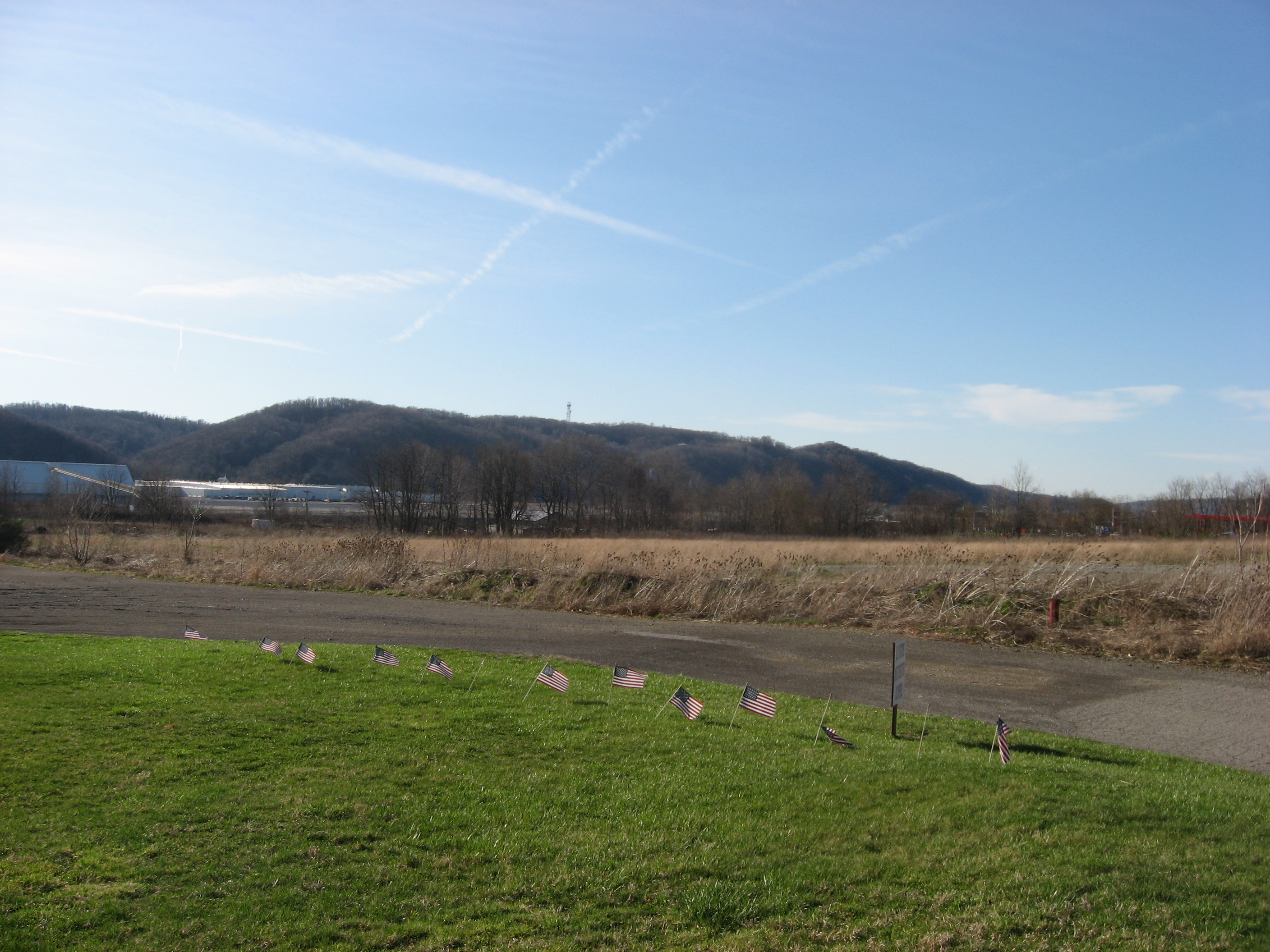
- Overview of the site

- Location within Pennsylvania Location within the United States
- Nearest city: Harmony Township, Beaver County, Pennsylvania
- Coordinates: 40°37′16″N 80°13′42″W
- Area: 20 acres (8.1 ha)
- Built: 1792
- Architect: Legion of the United States
- NRHP reference No.: 75001617

Significant dates
- Added to NRHP: March 27, 1975
- Designated PHMC: September 25, 1946

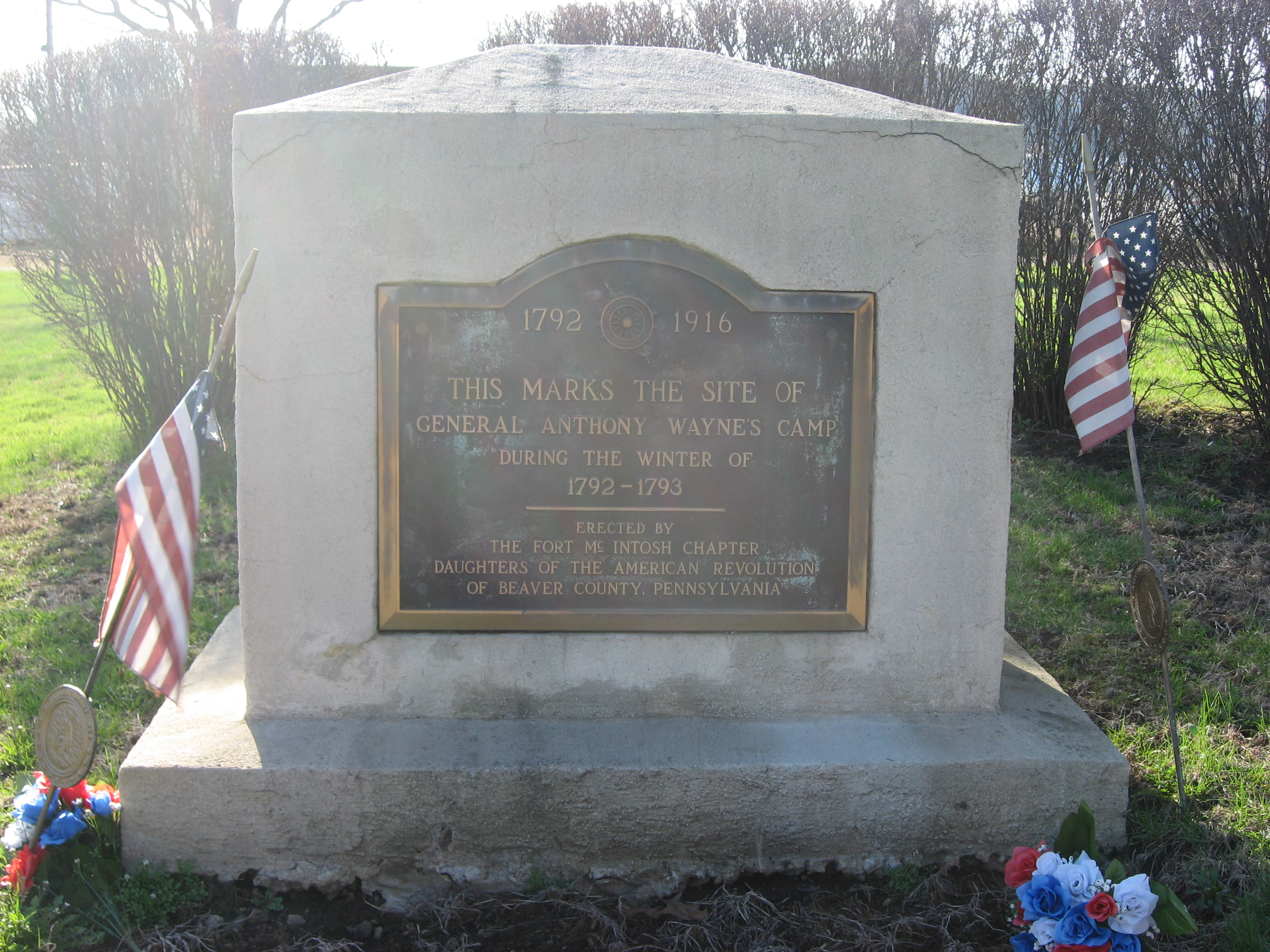
Monument at Legionville

Legionville (or Legion Ville) was the first formal basic training facility for the military of the United States. The camp, which was established in winter 1792 under the command of Major General Anthony Wayne, was near present-day Baden, Pennsylvania, a suburb of Pittsburgh. It was used to train the soldiers which would become the Legion of the United States.

Throughout the winter of 1792-93, existing troops along with new recruits were drilled in military skills, tactics and discipline. The following spring the newly named Legion of the United States left Legionville for the Northwest Indian War, a struggle between American Indian tribes affiliated with the Western Confederacy in the area north of the Ohio River.

The overwhelmingly successful campaign was concluded with the decisive victory at the Battle of Fallen Timbers on August 20, 1794. The training the troops received at Legionville was seen as instrumental to this victory.

== Background ==
The United States military realized it needed a well-trained standing army following St. Clair's Defeat on November 4, 1791, when a force led by General Arthur St. Clair was almost entirely wiped out by the Western Confederacy near Fort Recovery, Ohio. The plans, which were supported by U.S. President George Washington and Henry Knox, Secretary of War, would lead to the creation of the Legion of the United States. The command would be based on the 18th-century military works of Henry Bouquet, a professional Swiss soldier who served as a colonel in the British army, and French Marshal Maurice de Saxe.

In 1792 Anthony Wayne, a renowned hero of the American Revolutionary War, was encouraged to leave retirement and return to active service as Commander-in-Chief of the Legion with the rank of Major General. The Legion, which was recruited and raised in Pittsburgh, Pennsylvania, was formed around elements of the 1st and 2nd Regiments from the disbanded Continental Army. These units then became the First and Second Sub-Legions. The Third and Fourth Sub-Legions were raised from additional recruits. From June 1792 to November 1792, the Legion remained cantoned at Fort LaFayette in Pittsburgh.

== Establishment ==
By October 1792, Major General Wayne had been seeking a suitable place to winter and train his army away from the distractions of the city. Wayne eventually found the perfect site 22 miles from Pittsburgh on the eastern bank of the Ohio River near the modern town of Baden, Pennsylvania. The site was either on or near a former Indian village called Logstown (circa 1727-1758). On November 9, an advance party arrived and began preparing the camp for the arrival of the main army. On November 28, 1792, Wayne left Pittsburgh by boat with a fanfare and good wishes from its citizens. Within four hours, he disembarked at the new cantonment that he dubbed Legion Ville.

The camp, which was laid out on an east-west axis, had steep ravines to the north, east and west. Four redoubts, numbered 1-4, ringed the cantonment. Each redoubt garrisoned 36 men with an additional 120 men stationed at guard posts around the perimeter. The defensive ditch surrounding the entire garrison area was more than a mile long. In total 260 men, guarded the camp seven days a week, twenty-four hours a day. In less than a month, Legion Ville had grown to more than 500 buildings and had a population five times larger than the city of Pittsburgh. Single story wooden barracks were built for the enlisted men of the dragoons, infantry, artillery and rifle-corps. Officers of the dragoons and artillery had two-story buildings. Major General Wayne's house and the hospital were two-story log cabins with chimneys on both sides. The total area of the cantonment was about 35 acres (140,000 m^{2}). Estimates of the personnel at Legion Ville vary, but 2,500 is the popular figure.

== History ==
After all Wayne's forces had been properly quartered, training started in earnest. The troops fired at targets every day as Wayne wanted marksmen. Bayonet drills, hand-to-hand combat, mock battles and overnight encampments outside the installation were also common. The dragoons (cavalry) under the command of Captain Robert MisCampbell built an obstacle course south of Legion Ville. The artillery lieutenants and captains built an artillery range. An auxiliary rifle range was built a half-mile west of the site. Troops were marched continually and battle formations and tactics taught to new officers. Discipline was harsh as courts martial were common; even minor infractions were dealt with severely (often lashing with a Cat o' nine tails). Captain William Eaton who would lead the U.S. Marines ashore at Tripoli in 1804 was often a presiding judge.

During the winter, 16 private soldiers died at Legion Ville and were buried in an unmarked cemetery near Redoubt Number 2 inside the camp. The exact location was identified by local archaeologists via a cadaver dog in 2013. Among the dead were: Henry Dundalo, William Perry, James White, Randolph Hutchins, William Williamson, John Patterson, John Fry and Jarrett Rogers.

An officer duel between Lieutenant Daniel Jenifer and Ensign William Pitt Gassaway resulted in the ensign being killed. He was buried in the unmarked military cemetery. Colonel Thomas Proctor visited the camp and stayed for months helping the artillery become proficient. On February 26, 1793, Dr. Joseph Strong of Connecticut climbed the western bank of the hill and drew a picture of the site in a letter to a friend, Dr. Mason Cogswell. This letter, the only known depiction of the site, is kept within the archives at Yale University.

On March 25, 1793 the Grand Masonic Lodge of the State of Pennsylvania granted the first Masonic Lodge in Beaver County. This was to be at Legion Ville and was known under charter as Lodge 58. The Master was Captain Robert MisCampbell, Senior Warden Captain Robert Tinsley and Junior Warden, William Eaton.

With Spring, Seneca leaders Guyasuta, Cornplanter and Big Tree met Wayne at Legion Ville in March 1793 to discuss peace terms. When the talks failed, George Washington gave the go-ahead for the campaign against the Indians. On April 30, 1793, the largest flotilla of military barges ever assembled on the Ohio River departed Legion Ville for Fort Washington, Cincinnati, Ohio. On August 20, 1794, the Legion of the United States defeated the Indian Confederacy at the Battle of Fallen Timbers. The Treaty of Greenville was signed on August 3, 1795 opening the Northwest Territory to settlement.

The discipline and intense training at Legion Ville was a key factor in the United States' winning of the Northwest Indian War.

== Site legacy ==
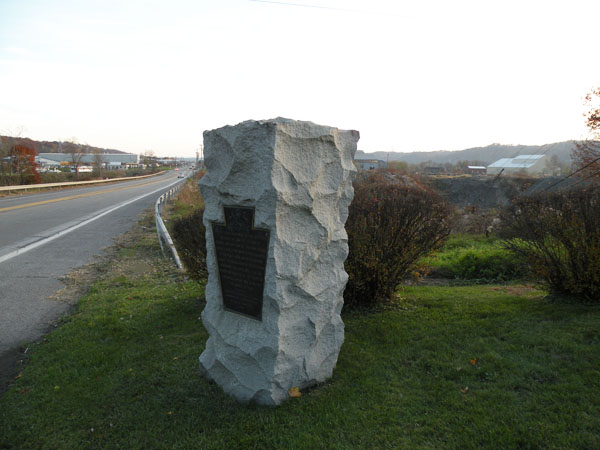
The stone marker at or near the former site of Legionville (1792-1793).

In 1824 the Harmony Society purchased the property on which Legion Ville stood. The site was later bought by the A.M. Byers Ironworks Company who in turn sold it to National Tire and Rubber Company of Akron, Ohio. In 1973, the Anthony Wayne Historical Society was formed to preserve the site. In 1994, the name was changed to the Legion Ville Historical Society.

Republican senator John Heinz from Pennsylvania wanted to make the site a national park but the Bill was pocket-vetoed due to a clerical error by President Jimmy Carter. National Tire and Rubber eventually sold the site. In 2005 it was acquired by developers. A portion of the site was proposed as the location of a car dealership in Spring 2013.

== See also ==
- West Point, New York, began officer training in 1794.
- List of European archaeological sites on the National Register of Historic Places in Pennsylvania
