= Fort Lafayette (Pennsylvania) =

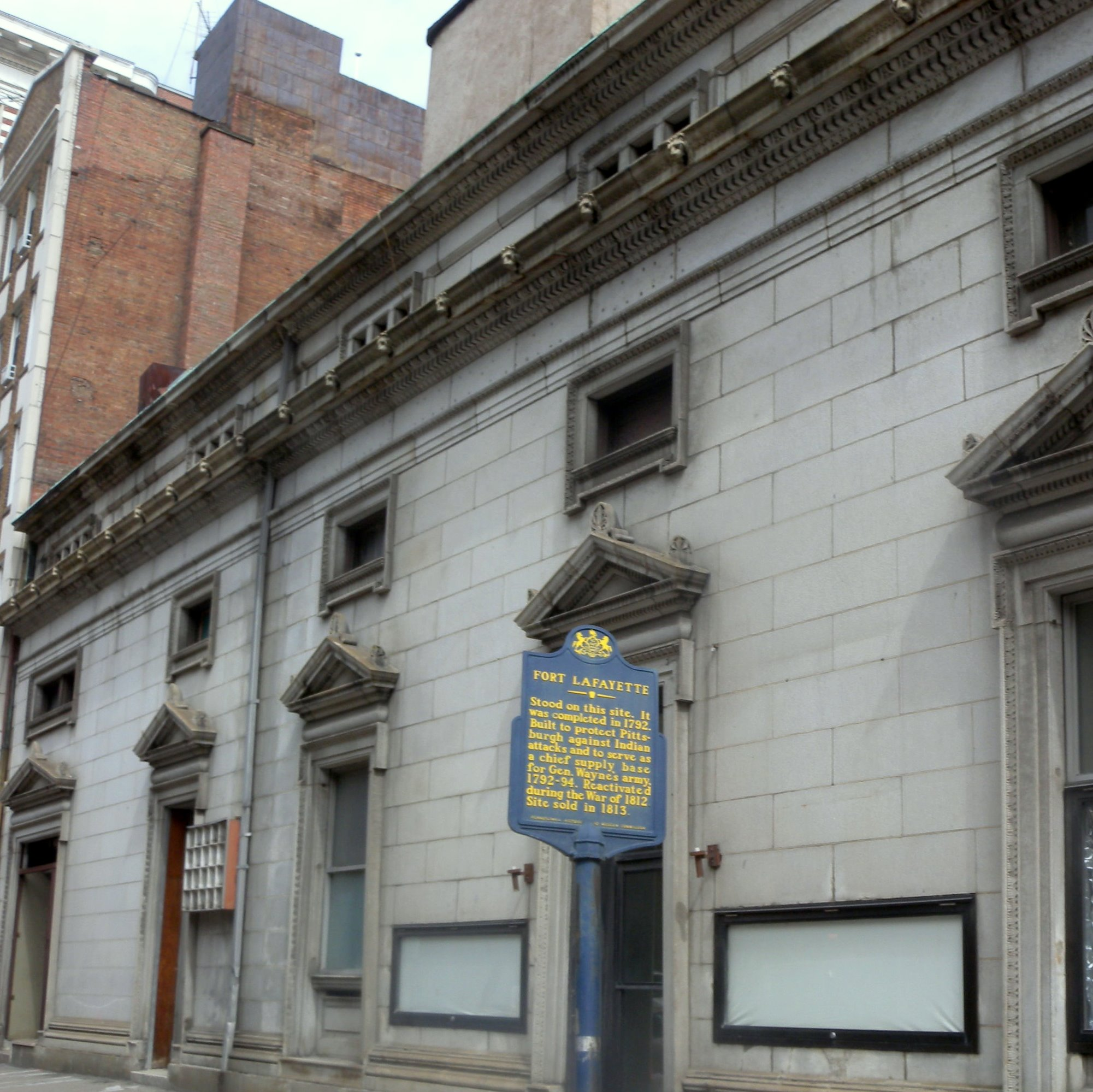
- 9th Street in 2011

- Location within Pittsburgh
- 40.4437°N 79.99834°W
- Location: 9th St. just N of Penn Ave., Pittsburgh, PA

History
- Built: September 4, 1792

Fort Lafayette, later renamed Fort Fayette, (1792–1814) was an American fort in Pittsburgh, Pennsylvania, United States. It was constructed in June 1792 by Major General Anthony Wayne upon his commission to form the Legion of the United States.

It was sited near present-day Penn Avenue and Ninth Street in the Cultural District of Downtown Pittsburgh.

== History ==
At the strategic position of the forks of the Ohio (where the Monongahela and Allegheny Rivers join to form the Ohio River near present-day Pittsburgh), a series of forts was built by the French, British and U.S. Continental armies starting in 1754. The French fort built in 1754 was named Du Quesne, later changed to Duquesne. Under imminent British attack in 1758, the French abandoned the fort and burned it to the ground. Between 1759 and 1761, the British built Fort Pitt on the site. It fell into bad shape and was decommissioned in 1772. Thereafter Virginians took control of the fort and called it Fort Dunmore. It was a staging point for Lord Dunmore's war in 1774.

The opening of Ohio Country to settlement and the construction of frontier forts starting with Fort Washington in 1789 prompted the United States in 1792 to build Fort Lafayette in Pittsburgh, to replace Fort Pitt, as a supply center for Fort McIntosh and downstream forts on the Ohio River. On September 4, 1792, Anthony Wayne establishes the fort. The name was later shortened to Fayette.

In 1803, Fort Fayette was a staging ground for the Lewis and Clark Expedition. The fort later served as Commodore Oliver Hazard Perry's supply base during the War of 1812. The army abandoned the fort in 1814.

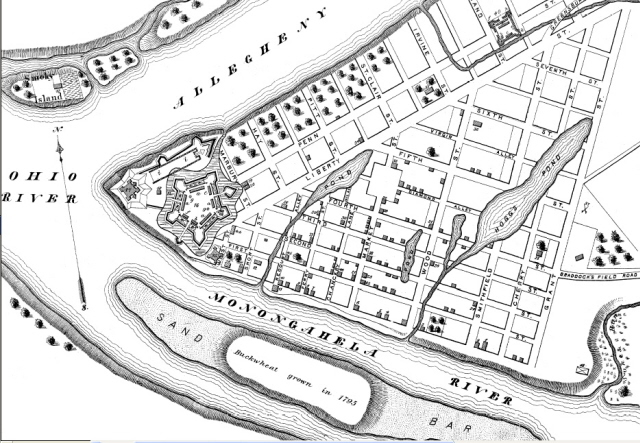
Fort Fayette is visible on this 1795 map near the upper-right corner.
