= List of United States tornadoes in May 2024 =

United States tornadoes in May 2024
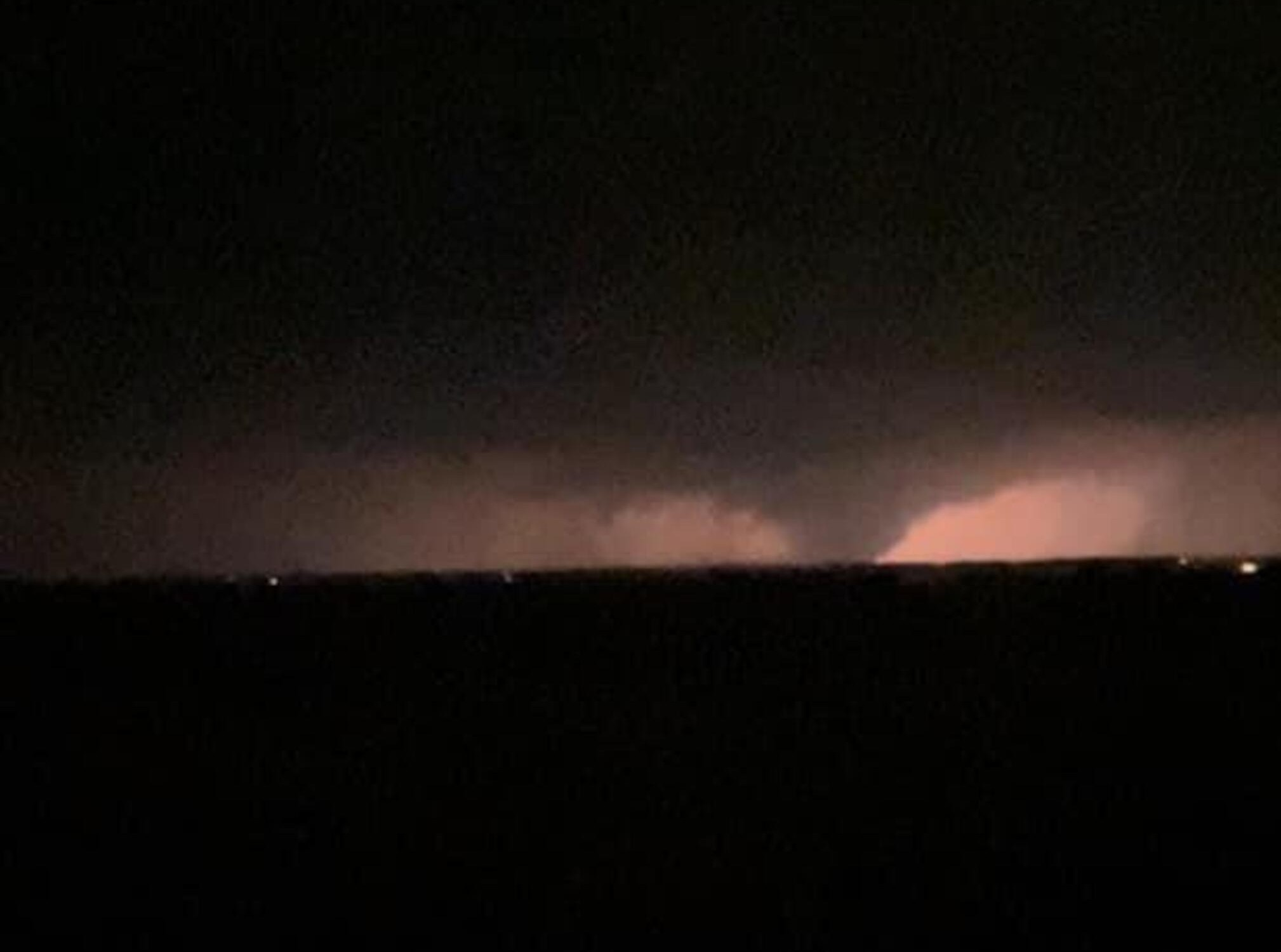
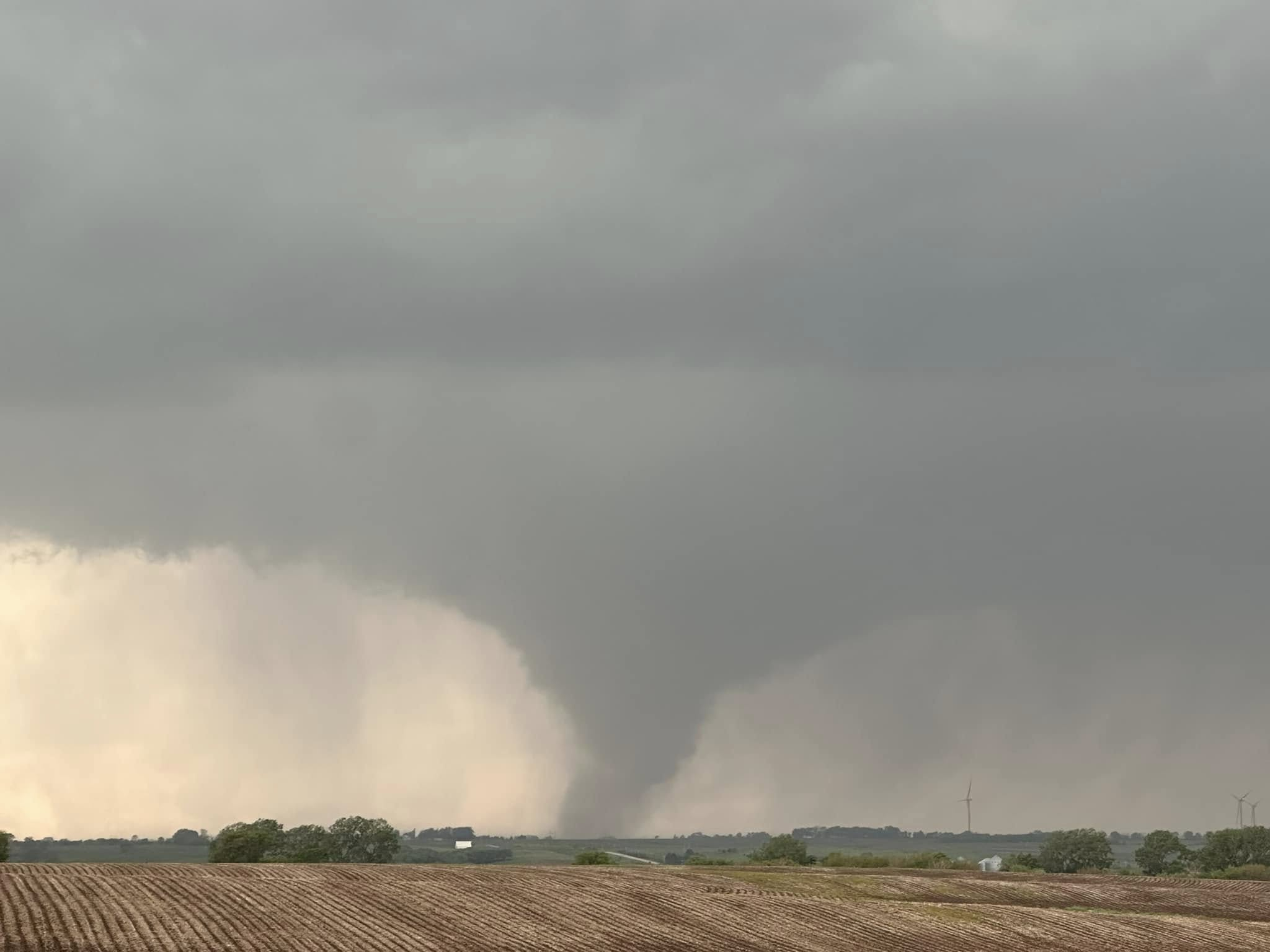
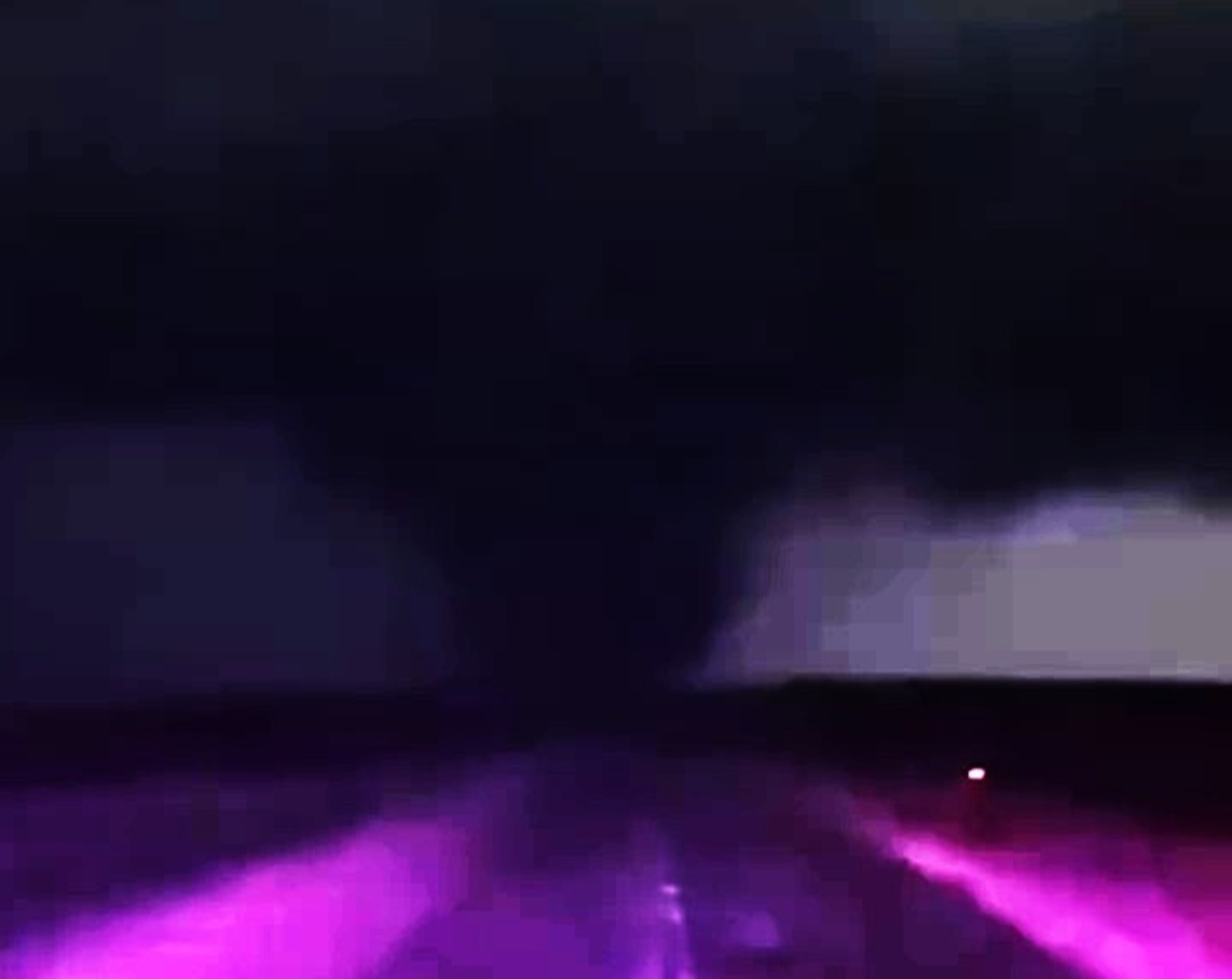
- Clockwise from top: A deadly EF3 tornado near Valley View, Texas on May 25; An EF4 tornado near Barnsdall, Oklahoma on May 6; A destructive EF4 tornado approaching Greenfield, Iowa on May 21
- Timespan: January 5 – March 26
- Maximum rated tornado: EF4 tornado: Barnsdall, Oklahoma on May 6; Greenfield, Iowa on May 21
- Tornadoes: 547
- Fatalities: 26
- Injuries: 320

This page documents all tornadoes confirmed by various weather forecast offices of the National Weather Service in the United States in May 2024. Tornado counts are considered preliminary until final publication in the database of the National Centers for Environmental Information. Based on the 1991–2020 average, about 268 tornadoes occur in May. Activity spreads northward and westward in May, with the maxima moving into the Midwest and the Great Plains as the springtime jet stream patterns tend to occur farther north (while the South begins to see decreasing activity), while the potential for tornadic activity also increases in the Northeastern United States.

May was a very active, violent, and deadly month for tornadoes. A very sharp temperature and moisture contrast due to a weakening El Niño caused temperatures across the Plains and Midwestern United States to be cooler than normal while record-breaking heat waves continued across Texas and Mexico. This temperature contrast led to an abnormally strong jet stream along with a marked increase in wind shear while the moisture contrast caused by a warmer than normal Gulf of Mexico led to abundant atmospheric instability. This pattern persisted throughout the entire month and, as a result, the trend of widespread, relentless tornadic weather that started at the end of April continued into May and only two of the 31 days in the month had no confirmed tornadoes. Additionally, this led to the Plains and Midwestern United States seeing abundance of tornadoes, which has become increasingly rare due to climate change shifting tornado alley eastward. This included EF4 tornadoes in Oklahoma and Iowa, as well as dozens of strong to intense tornadoes. Having been struck by another EF4 tornado in the previous month, it was the first time since 2013 that multiple violent tornadoes occurred in Oklahoma in the same year. By May 21, May had exceeded its average tornado count, making it the first time since 2019 that May was above average. It finished with 547 tornadoes and 27 tornadic fatalities were confirmed. It was the second most active May on record behind only 2003 (and the third most active month overall, behind that month and April 2011). In addition to the tornadoes, three derechos occurred during the month as well.

== May ==
Confirmed tornadoes by Enhanced Fujita rating
EFU	EF0	EF1	EF2	EF3	EF4	EF5	Total
86	172	226	43	18	2	0	547

=== May 1 event ===
List of confirmed tornadoes – Wednesday, May 1, 2024 (Note: All dates are based on the local time zone where the tornado touched down; however, all times are in Coordinated Universal Time for consistency.)
EF#	Location	County / Parish	State	Start Coord.	Time (UTC)	Path length	Max width
EFU	S of Fort Stockton	Pecos	TX	30.87°N 102.89°W	18:52–18:57	unknown	unknown
EFU	A nearly stationary landspout remained over an open field.						
EFU	E of Fort Stockton (1st tornado)	Pecos	TX	30.89°N 102.84°W	19:35–19:38	unknown	unknown
EFU	The first of two simultaneous landspouts observed to be stationary over open land. No damage occurred.						
EFU	E of Fort Stockton (2nd tornado)	Pecos	TX	30.89°N 102.84°W	19:35–19:38	unknown	unknown
EFU	The second of two simultaneous landspouts observed to be stationary over open land. No damage occurred.						
EFU	S of Fort Stockton	Pecos	TX	30.65°N 102.84°W	20:28–20:49	7.4 mi (11.9 km)	380 yd (350 m)
EFU	High-resolution satellite imagery showed a tornado scar through shrubland.						
EF0	W of Clarendon	Donley	TX	34.9165°N 100.9991°W	20:56–20:58	0.37 mi (0.60 km)	125 yd (114 m)
EF0	A tornado damaged some vegetation and fencing.						
EF1	WSW of Clarendon	Donley	TX	34.9207°N 101.0125°W	21:04–21:19	1.78 mi (2.86 km)	150 yd (140 m)
EF1	A water pumping windmill was destroyed and vegetation was damaged. This tornado moved directly over the path of the previous tornado.						
EF0	W of George	Kittitas	WA	47.0693°N 120.0547°W	22:00	0.35 mi (0.56 km)	1 yd (0.91 m)
EF0	This landspout tornado was filmed in the Wenatchee Mountains from east of the Columbia River. This is the first tornado recorded in Kittitas County since reliable records began in 1950.						
EFU	SSE of Spearman	Hutchinson	TX	36.0183°N 101.1136°W	22:14–22:16	1.01 mi (1.63 km)	25 yd (23 m)
EFU	A brief tornado was observed by law enforcement and storm chasers.						
EFU	NNW of Turkey	Hall	TX	34.4927°N 100.9354°W	22:49	0.04 mi (0.064 km)	30 yd (27 m)
EFU	Several storm chasers photographed a brief tornado.						
EFU	NNE of Healy	Gove	KS	38.7497°N 100.4661°W	23:26–23:27	0.07 mi (0.11 km)	50 yd (46 m)
EFU	This tornado was reported by multiple storm chasers and occurred over rural land.						
EF0	WSW of Spearman	Hansford	TX	36.1894°N 101.2097°W	23:43–23:44	0.32 mi (0.51 km)	30 yd (27 m)
EF0	A high-end EF0 tornado unroofed a building and damaged some trees.						
EF0	Southeastern Spearman	Hansford	TX	36.1851°N 101.1895°W	23:46–23:48	0.22 mi (0.35 km)	15 yd (14 m)
EF0	The tornado damaged a small shed and utility trailer at the Spearman High School.						
EF1	Northern Spearman	Hansford	TX	36.1978°N 101.1874°W	23:53–23:55	1.3 mi (2.1 km)	75 yd (69 m)
EF1	Several buildings sustained roof damage and some carports were damaged on the northeastern side of Spearman. Some power poles were snapped.						
EFU	N of Lorenzo	Crosby	TX	33.7568°N 101.53°W	00:10	0.01 mi (0.016 km)	30 yd (27 m)
EFU	A brief rope tornado was photographed over open land.						
EFU	E of Petersburg	Floyd	TX	33.867°N 101.529°W	00:20	unknown	unknown
EFU	This brief landspout was reported by local broadcast media.						
EFU	ENE of Turkey	Hall	TX	34.4146°N 100.8303°W	00:52–00:57	1.3 mi (2.1 km)	100 yd (91 m)
EFU	This tornado was captured through photographs by numerous storm chasers. It remained over open land and caused no known damage.						
EFU	NW of Utica	Gove, Lane	KS	38.699°N 100.3057°W	01:55–02:01	0.02 mi (0.032 km)	50 yd (46 m)
EFU	A landspout tornado occurred on the Gove and Lane county line.						

=== May 2 event ===
List of confirmed tornadoes – Thursday, May 2, 2024
EF#	Location	County / Parish	State	Start Coord.	Time (UTC)	Path length	Max width
EFU	NW of Faxon	Comanche	OK	34.4702°N 98.5924°W	05:04	0.5 mi (0.80 km)	40 yd (37 m)
EFU	A tornado debris signature was observed on radar, but no damage could be found.						
EF1	W of Robeline	Sabine, Natchitoches	LA	31.6682°N 93.4195°W	15:09–15:19	5.19 mi (8.35 km)	325 yd (297 m)
EF1	Several large trees were uprooted and several large tree trunks were snapped.						
EFU	SSW of Welsh	Jefferson Davis	LA	30.2065°N 92.8326°W	16:32	0.01 mi (0.016 km)	1 yd (0.91 m)
EFU	This tornado was reported in an open field by a storm spotter.						
EF1	Southeastern Carl Junction	Jasper	MO	37.1546°N 94.5204°W	18:40–18:42	0.77 mi (1.24 km)	100 yd (91 m)
EF1	Numerous trees were damaged or uprooted, one of which significantly damaged a home after it fell on it. Four other homes had minor roof and siding damage.						
EF0	Eastern Arecibo	Arecibo	PR	18.4721°N 66.7041°W	20:58–21:07	0.48 mi (0.77 km)	4 yd (3.7 m)
EF0	A waterspout moved onshore the Cambalache barrio of Arecibo, downing mangrove branches and blowing away street signs and canopies.						
EF2	ENE of Ballinger to SSW of Benoit	Runnels	TX	31.7582°N 99.923°W	22:53–23:15	4.5 mi (7.2 km)	390 yd (360 m)
EF2	A strong tornado moved a one-story house off its foundation and severely damaged a metal barn. Wooden utility poles were also damaged.						
EFU	NW of Anson	Jones	TX	32.7767°N 100.0502°W	23:29–23:37	0.76 mi (1.22 km)	100 yd (91 m)
EFU	A storm chaser observed a tornado over open country.						
EF2	NW of Doole	Concho, McCulloch	TX	31.4831°N 99.6676°W	23:39–00:04	6.11 mi (9.83 km)	395 yd (361 m)
EF2	A strong tornado damaged electrical transmission lines on metal truss towers, including one of the towers collapsed.						
EF3	W of Hawley	Jones	TX	32.6241°N 99.8609°W	00:06–00:33	3.29 mi (5.29 km)	210 yd (190 m)
EF3	A high-end EF3 tornado first damaged metal outbuildings and snapped trees and power poles. A home under construction that was 80–90% complete was destroyed with its concrete slab swept clean. Several trucks and a trailer near the home were thrown 100 yd (91 m) by the tornado. The tornado destroyed another home, fully clearing it off its foundation and injuring four people. Homes and outbuildings subsequently sustained roof and wall damage in a small neighborhood before the tornado dissipated shortly thereafter. This tornado was extremely slow-moving, with an average forward speed of 7.3 miles per hour (11.7 km/h).						

=== May 3 event ===
List of confirmed tornadoes – Friday, May 3, 2024
EF#	Location	County / Parish	State	Start Coord.	Time (UTC)	Path length	Max width
EF2	SSW of Silver	Coke	TX	32.028°N 100.7034°W	20:40–20:55	4.54 mi (7.31 km)	125 yd (114 m)
EF2	The roof of a ranch house was ripped off, and a metal barn was completely destroyed, with building material tossed well downstream.						
EFU	N of Hale Center	Hale	TX	34.1102°N 101.8322°W	21:35	0.01 mi (0.016 km)	30 yd (27 m)
EFU	An off-duty NWS employee and a trained spotter reported a brief tornado over an open field.						
EF3	SSE of Robert Lee	Coke	TX	31.8374°N 100.4901°W	21:35–21:55	3.53 mi (5.68 km)	350 yd (320 m)
EF3	This erratic, low-end EF3 tornado completely destroyed a manufactured home and heavily damaged the walls and roof of a metal barn next to the home. The tornado also damaged the roof of another home and snapped large tree limbs. The tornado then lifted the roof off a concrete building before moving northwest and occluding.						
EF0	NW of Deerfield	Kearny	KS	38.26°N 101.28°W	01:10	0.01 mi (0.016 km)	10 yd (9.1 m)
EF0	A brief tornado was recorded by a storm spotter.						
EF1	WNW of Atlanta	Phelps	NE	40.3723°N 99.5132°W	01:53–01:55	0.65 mi (1.05 km)	50 yd (46 m)
EF1	A brief tornado heavily damaged the roof of a home.						
EF1	Eastern Holdrege	Phelps	NE	40.43°N 99.36°W	02:08–02:21	5.27 mi (8.48 km)	850 yd (780 m)
EF1	A high-end, intermittent EF1 tornado touched down near the Phelps County fairgrounds area and began moving due north through eastern Holdrege. On the east side of town, wooden poles were snapped, a pivot was overturned and multiple manufactured homes had damage. After exiting town, the tornado reached peak intensity as it damaged newer, well-built outbuildings. Roof damage to homes was also noted nearby the outbuildings. The tornado then turned northeast damaging numerous trees, power poles and center-line irrigation pivots before dissipating.						
EF0	NW of Ragan	Harlan, Phelps	NE	40.3073°N 99.3679°W	02:09–02:20	7.1 mi (11.4 km)	500 yd (460 m)
EF0	A weak, intermittent tornado damaged trees, irrigation pivots, and a few power poles.						
EF1	N of Holdrege	Phelps	NE	40.46°N 99.38°W	02:11–02:21	1.26 mi (2.03 km)	250 yd (230 m)
EF1	A high-end EF1 tornado touched down just north of town at a golf course. Moving northeast, the tornado overturned pivots and snapped several power poles. Trees were damaged as well.						
EF0	N of Guide Rock to S of Lawrence	Webster, Nuckolls	NE	40.1563°N 98.3358°W	03:51–03:58	5.84 mi (9.40 km)	80 yd (73 m)
EF0	A tornado sporadically damaged trees, farmsteads, and outbuildings.						

=== May 4 event ===
List of confirmed tornadoes – Saturday, May 4, 2024
EF#	Location	County / Parish	State	Start Coord.	Time (UTC)	Path length	Max width
EF2	S of Fort Stockton	Pecos	TX	30.76°N 102.89°W	20:56–21:15	6.36 mi (10.24 km)	175 yd (160 m)
EF2	This strong tornado tracked southeastward over rural Pecos County south of Fort Stockton, beginning near US 385. Vegetation was damaged and power poles were cleanly snapped near their bases.						
EFU	SSE of Fort Stockton (1st tornado)	Pecos	TX	30.69°N 102.78°W	21:18–21:36	3.28 mi (5.28 km)	50 yd (46 m)
EFU	A tornado was observed but occurred over a rural and inaccessible area west of US 285.						
EFU	SSE of Fort Stockton (2nd tornado)	Pecos	TX	30.64°N 102.72°W	21:40–21:55	2.73 mi (4.39 km)	150 yd (140 m)
EFU	A tornado was observed but occurred over a rural and inaccessible area west of US 285.						
EFU	SSE of Fort Stockton (3rd tornado)	Pecos	TX	30.59°N 102.67°W	22:04–22:08	0.91 mi (1.46 km)	50 yd (46 m)
EFU	A tornado was observed but occurred over a rural and inaccessible area west of US 285.						
EFU	SSE of Fort Stockton (4th tornado)	Pecos	TX	30.55°N 102.58°W	22:29–22:38	1.82 mi (2.93 km)	50 yd (46 m)
EFU	A tornado was observed but occurred over a rural and inaccessible area west of US 285.						
EFU	ENE of Chattanooga	Mercer	OH	40.64°N 84.71°W	23:38–23:40	0.6 mi (0.97 km)	30 yd (27 m)
EFU	A weak landspout tornado caused no damage.						
EF2	NE of Pandale to S of Ozona	Crockett	TX	30.3416°N 101.4319°W	02:10–02:45	20.08 mi (32.32 km)	125 yd (114 m)
EF2	A long-lived tornado damaged several structures on a ranch. The roof structure of a barn was uplifted and destroyed. A heavy metal bulk feeder was lifted at least 5 ft (1.5 m) into the air and then deposited about 150 ft (46 m) from its original location. A very old tree trunk was snapped.						

=== May 5 event ===
List of confirmed tornadoes – Sunday, May 5, 2024
EF#	Location	County / Parish	State	Start Coord.	Time (UTC)	Path length	Max width
EF0	ESE of Lockesburg	Sevier	AR	33.9422°N 94.1116°W	23:45–23:47	0.54 mi (0.87 km)	20 yd (18 m)
EF0	A landspout tornado snapped small branches and damaged the roof of a home and a carport.						

=== May 6 event ===
List of confirmed tornadoes – Monday, May 6, 2024
EF#	Location	County / Parish	State	Start Coord.	Time (UTC)	Path length	Max width
EF0	N of Wellfleet	Lincoln	NE	40.88°N 100.7°W	16:53–17:02	0.87 mi (1.40 km)	10 yd (9.1 m)
EF0	A landspout caused minor tree damage over open country.						
EFU	SW of Mud Butte	Butte	SD	44.8786°N 103.0536°W	18:49–18:53	3.45 mi (5.55 km)	10 yd (9.1 m)
EFU	A tornado occurred in a highly rural area, precluding a damage survey.						
EFU	WSW of Mud Butte	Butte	SD	44.9596°N 103.0919°W	19:07–19:31	10.5 mi (16.9 km)	10 yd (9.1 m)
EFU	A tornado occurred in a highly rural area, precluding a damage survey.						
EF0	SE of Taylorsville	Wilson	TN	36.2551°N 86.1835°W	19:55–19:56	0.51 mi (0.82 km)	50 yd (46 m)
EF0	A brief tornado downed a few trees.						
EF0	SE of Cowles	Webster	NE	40.1451°N 98.3966°W	21:19–21:29	7 mi (11 km)	40 yd (37 m)
EF0	A likely rain-wrapped tornado damaged outbuildings, inflicted minor tree damage, and overturned a camper.						
EF1	Smithville	DeKalb	TN	35.9719°N 85.8700°W	21:21–21:33	3.23 mi (5.20 km)	150 yd (140 m)
EF1	A tornado began on the west side of Smithville, moving along SR 83 north of town, where numerous trees were downed, several homes sustained roof damage, and several barns and outbuildings were damaged or destroyed. The tornado reached its peak intensity of EF1 along SR 56 on the north side of downtown, where a home sustained partial roof loss and structural damage, a barn was damaged, numerous trees were downed, and a power pole was broken.						
EFU	NW of Arnold	Custer	NE	41.47°N 100.25°W	21:40	0.1 mi (0.16 km)	1 yd (0.91 m)
EFU	A landspout was recorded and photographed over open country.						
EFU	NW of Ringwood to SSE of Helena	Major, Alfalfa	OK	36.459°N 98.317°W	23:04–23:11	3.81 mi (6.13 km)	30 yd (27 m)
EFU	A rain-wrapped tornado was reported by a storm spotter.						
EF1	SSE of Okeene to W of Hennessey	Blaine, Kingfisher	OK	36.058°N 98.284°W	23:41–00:02	11.08 mi (17.83 km)	300 yd (270 m)
EF1	Three outbuildings had their roofs significantly damaged. Power poles and trees were damaged or snapped as well.						
EF0	N of Krider	Gage	NE	40.1376°N 96.7496°W	00:07–00:08	0.99 mi (1.59 km)	30 yd (27 m)
EF0	A brief tornado damaged a supply building on US 77.						
EF0	NE of Beatrice	Gage	NE	40.321°N 96.692°W	00:16–00:17	0.22 mi (0.35 km)	20 yd (18 m)
EF0	A cattle shed, a barn, and a home's covered porch were damaged.						
EF0	S of Bison	Garfield	OK	36.174°N 97.89°W	00:27	0.2 mi (0.32 km)	50 yd (46 m)
EF0	Sign posts were damaged.						
EF0	ESE of Bison	Garfield	OK	36.174°N 97.804°W	00:34	0.2 mi (0.32 km)	30 yd (27 m)
EF0	An outbuilding was damaged.						
EF0	S of Manhattan	Riley	KS	39.14°N 96.58°W	00:39–00:44	1.18 mi (1.90 km)	75 yd (69 m)
EF0	A small tornado damaged trees and overturned an irrigation pivot.						
EF1	Douglas to S of Covington	Garfield	OK	36.261°N 97.675°W	00:44–00:54	6.26 mi (10.07 km)	300 yd (270 m)
EF1	This tornado damaged at least two outbuildings, power poles and trees.						
EF0	E of Ponca City	Kay	OK	36.713°N 97.034°W	01:44–01:45	0.72 mi (1.16 km)	30 yd (27 m)
EF0	Trees and homes were damaged along the southwest side of Lake Ponca.						
EF1	SSE of Glenwood	Mills	IA	40.99°N 95.706°W	01:48–01:55	5.66 mi (9.11 km)	250 yd (230 m)
EF1	A fast-moving tornado severely impacted a farm, destroying a large shed and scattering debris from two grain bins 0.5 mi (0.80 km) downwind. Two other farmsteads sustained high-end EF1 damage. Numerous trees and large tree branches were snapped.						
EF1	N of Kaw City	Kay	OK	36.782°N 96.924°W	01:54–02:03	8 mi (13 km)	75 yd (69 m)
EF1	Trees and a boat dock were damaged. A camper was overturned. The tornado likely dissipated as a waterspout over Kaw Lake.						
EFU	W of Elgin	Chautauqua	KS	36.9998°N 96.4138°W	01:55–01:57	0.01 mi (0.016 km)	10 yd (9.1 m)
EFU	This tornado was reported via social media just north of the Oklahoma state line.						
EF1	W of Macedonia	Pottawattamie	IA	41.203°N 95.499°W	02:07–02:09	1.53 mi (2.46 km)	200 yd (180 m)
EF1	The tornado inflicted shingle damage on a home and snapped trees.						
EF4	ENE of Osage to Barnsdall to eastern Bartlesville	Osage, Washington	OK	36.3304°N 96.3559°W	02:12–03:07	40.8 mi (65.7 km)	1,700 yd (1,600 m)
EF4	2 deaths – See article on this tornado – 33 people were injured.						
EF1	ESE of Minden to WSW of Shelby	Pottawattamie, Shelby	IA	41.463°N 95.525°W	02:13–02:19	3.98 mi (6.41 km)	450 yd (410 m)
EF1	A transmission line was damaged where the tornado initially touched down. Several outbuildings and trees were damaged along the tornado path before the tornado lifted west of Shelby.						
EF0	S of Burlington	Coffey	KS	38.12°N 95.75°W	02:22–02:23	0.86 mi (1.38 km)	50 yd (46 m)
EF0	Emergency management reported minor damage.						
EF0	ESE of Sharpe	Coffey	KS	38.24°N 95.59°W	02:30–02:35	2.2 mi (3.5 km)	30 yd (27 m)
EF0	A weak tornado damaged trees and a barn.						
EF0	SSE of Carney	Lincoln	OK	35.767°N 97.016°W	03:56–04:01	2.2 mi (3.5 km)	50 yd (46 m)
EF0	A tornado debris signature was observed on radar but no damage was found.						
EF0	NE of Hoover to ESE of Ridgely	Platte, Clay	MO	39.3769°N 94.6713°W	03:59–04:06	5.99 mi (9.64 km)	50 yd (46 m)
EF0	Damage was primarily limited to trees.						

=== May 7 event ===
List of confirmed tornadoes – Tuesday, May 7, 2024
EF#	Location	County / Parish	State	Start Coord.	Time (UTC)	Path length	Max width
EF0	WNW of Picher, OK to ENE of Columbus, KS	Ottawa (OK), Cherokee (KS)	OK, KS	36.9686°N 95.0005°W	04:00–04:24	24.09 mi (38.77 km)	1,100 yd (1,000 m)
EF0	Numerous trees were snapped or uprooted and multiple barns were damaged.						
EF0	NE of Sherwin	Cherokee	KS	37.21°N 94.8974°W	04:13–04:15	2.67 mi (4.30 km)	50 yd (46 m)
EF0	Several outbuildings were destroyed, barns were damaged and trees were downed.						
EF1	Southern Blue Springs to Grain Valley	Jackson	MO	39.9674°N 94.2673°W	04:26–04:35	5.83 mi (9.38 km)	50 yd (46 m)
EF1	This tornado touched down in the southern portion of Blue Springs, destroying a gazebo. The tornado tracked northeast damaging several commercial buildings in both Blue Springs and Grain Valley. As the tornado crossed I-70, a semi-truck was knocked over and two RV trailers from a nearby dealership were tossed into a ditch.						
EF1	Joplin to Duquesne	Jasper	MO	37.06°N 94.51°W	04:29–04:34	4.49 mi (7.23 km)	100 yd (91 m)
EF1	The tornado caused intermittent damage across southern portions of Joplin, uprooting trees and stripping shingles from homes. Flying debris resulted in additional roof damage.						
EF1	Southern Oklahoma City	Oklahoma	OK	35.378°N 97.543°W	04:39–04:42	2.2 mi (3.5 km)	75 yd (69 m)
EF1	This tornado touched down east of Will Rogers World Airport, dealing roof damage to a few apartment buildings. Some businesses were damaged and tree was damage was also noted.						
EF1	W of Carthage	Jasper	MO	37.155°N 94.3751°W	04:38–04:39	2.03 mi (3.27 km)	100 yd (91 m)
EF1	The tornado uprooted many trees and blew down power lines. Several roofs were also damaged.						
EF1	Southern Oklahoma City to Del City	Oklahoma	OK	35.427°N 97.463°W	04:46–04:47	1.1 mi (1.8 km)	30 yd (27 m)
EF1	A storage facility and the roofs of a few homes were damaged.						
EF1	SE of Slick to WSW of Beggs	Creek, Okmulgee	OK	35.698°N 96.213°W	05:06–05:13	4 mi (6.4 km)	350 yd (320 m)
EF1	Multiple trees were uprooted and large tree limbs were snapped.						
EF0	NE of Greenfield	Dade	MO	37.437°N 93.761°W	05:12–05:14	0.44 mi (0.71 km)	200 yd (180 m)
EF0	This brief tornado uprooted several trees.						
EF0	S of Lowry City	St. Clair	MO	38.1025°N 93.7422°W	05:21–05:25	1 mi (1.6 km)	100 yd (91 m)
EF0	Trees were damaged.						
EF0	S of Cave Spring to W of Olive	Greene, Polk, Dallas	MO	37.3217°N 93.465°W	05:33–05:55	18.69 mi (30.08 km)	150 yd (140 m)
EF0	This tornado uprooted trees along its path. Two homes were damaged by windthrown trees, resulting in one injury.						
EF1	N of Lacelle to ESE of Osceola	Clarke	IA	40.9694°N 93.8474°W	05:38–05:46	6.16 mi (9.91 km)	80 yd (73 m)
EF1	This tornado initially damaged an outbuilding at a farmstead before uprooting several trees south of Osceola. One house also had portions of its roof removed.						
EF0	S of Levasy to Napoleon	Jackson, Lafayette	MO	39.0772°N 94.1199°W	05:39–05:45	4.43 mi (7.13 km)	50 yd (46 m)
EF0	Several trees were snapped or uprooted. Utility wires and an outbuilding were damaged.						
EF0	Woodburn	Clarke	IA	41.0079°N 93.6118°W	05:53–05:56	2.01 mi (3.23 km)	80 yd (73 m)
EF0	This tornado began southwest of town, causing some damage to trees. The tornado then entered town, where it collapsed the wall of a commercial building and caused minor damage to a home. Trees and powerlines were also damaged throughout town. Exiting the town, the tornado damaged an outbuilding and tree limbs at a farmstead before lifting.						
EF1	NE of Weleetka	Okfuskee	OK	35.3714°N 96.1295°W	06:05–06:11	2.8 mi (4.5 km)	200 yd (180 m)
EF1	A tornado uprooted trees, snapped large tree limbs and damaged outbuildings.						
EF0	SE of Ackworth	Warren	IA	41.3476°N 93.4862°W	06:12–06:16	3.12 mi (5.02 km)	80 yd (73 m)
EF0	An outbuilding and a couple trees were damaged.						
EF0	Prairie City	Jasper	IA	41.5984°N 93.2308°W	06:35–06:36	0.14 mi (0.23 km)	30 yd (27 m)
EF0	This brief tornado minorly damaged a few garages. Tree damage also occurred.						
EF0	SSE of Knoxville to WSW of Harvey	Marion	IA	41.255°N 93.0637°W	06:37–06:43	4.96 mi (7.98 km)	80 yd (73 m)
EF0	A tornado passed through a few farmsteads, mainly damaging trees.						
EF1	E of LaMonte to NNE of Beaman	Pettis	MO	38.73°N 93.3°W	06:51–07:05	9.74 mi (15.68 km)	75 yd (69 m)
EF1	This tornado damaged trees and a home.						
EF2	SSE of Stilwell, OK to E of Odell, AR	Adair (OK), Washington (AR)	OK, AR	35.7363°N 94.5946°W	07:23–07:39	11.7 mi (18.8 km)	800 yd (730 m)
EF2	Outbuildings were destroyed and numerous trees were snapped or uprooted.						
EF0	SW of Franks to ENE of Dixon	Pulaski, Phelps, Maries	MO	37.91°N 92.12°W	07:28–07:38	9.83 mi (15.82 km)	150 yd (140 m)
EF0	An intermittent tornado uprooted several trees and snapped large tree limbs.						
EF1	NNE of Rudy to SE of Mountainburg	Crawford	AR	35.5855°N 94.2375°W	07:43–07:50	5.7 mi (9.2 km)	900 yd (820 m)
EF1	An outbuilding was destroyed and trees were snapped or uprooted.						
EF1	ENE of Mount Airy to western Moberly	Randolph	MO	39.39°N 92.6°W	07:43–07:56	8.27 mi (13.31 km)	250 yd (230 m)
EF1	Outside Moberly, multiple trees were uprooted and minor roof damage occurred. A water tank was also destroyed. Once in Moberly, the tornado snapped power poles, downed power lines, and produced considerable tree damage. Some trees were uprooted and fell on property, damaging vehicles, shingles, and breaking windows.						
EF1	Northeastern Van Buren to SSW of Dyer	Crawford	AR	35.4544°N 94.3168°W	07:43–07:53	9.2 mi (14.8 km)	1,100 yd (1,000 m)
EF1	A high-end EF1 damaged homes and snapped or uprooted numerous trees.						
EF0	Southern Higbee	Randolph	MO	39.3°N 92.52°W	07:44–07:47	2.25 mi (3.62 km)	400 yd (370 m)
EF0	An EF0 tornado damaged a large section of the southern part of Higbee. Most of the damage was to trees. A car was displaced a couple feet in the parking lot and a trailer was blown into a business property. As the tornado moved along Route A, multiple large trees were blown down and smaller trees were uprooted. Some trees fell on property, damaging vehicles and several residences.						
EF1	NW of Graphic	Crawford	AR	35.5899°N 94.1852°W	07:48–07:49	0.6 mi (0.97 km)	100 yd (91 m)
EF1	A couple trees were uprooted and some of those trees fell on homes. Large tree limbs were also snapped.						
EF1	N of Blackburn	Washington	AR	35.8397°N 94.2257°W	07:55–07:58	1.8 mi (2.9 km)	150 yd (140 m)
EF1	A tornado destroyed an outbuilding and uprooted trees.						
EF1	E of Mountainburg	Franklin	AR	35.64°N 94.0532°W	07:55–08:00	3.9 mi (6.3 km)	1,200 yd (1,100 m)
EF1	A large tornado snapped and uprooted numerous trees. A few outbuildings were also damaged.						
EF1	SE of Hazel Valley to S of Crosses	Washington, Madison	AR	35.8396°N 93.9612°W	08:08–08:13	2.8 mi (4.5 km)	550 yd (500 m)
EF1	Numerous trees were snapped or uprooted.						
EF0	NNW of Hinch	Crawford	MO	38.105°N 91.195°W	08:44–08:45	0.72 mi (1.16 km)	75 yd (69 m)
EF0	A weak tornado uprooted trees and snapped large tree limbs.						
EF1	Eastern Sullivan	Franklin	MO	38.217°N 91.137°W	08:45–08:46	0.31 mi (0.50 km)	150 yd (140 m)
EF1	This very brief tornado snapped or uprooted trees, damaged businesses and homes, and lofted debris into trees.						
EF0	N of Defiance	St. Charles	MO	38.665°N 90.812°W	09:21–09:22	2.23 mi (3.59 km)	50 yd (46 m)
EF0	A very weak tornado snapped large tree limbs and uprooted trees.						
EF0	SSW of Blaine, IL to SE of Fontana-on-Geneva Lake, WI	Boone (IL), McHenry (IL), Walworth (WI)	IL, WI	42.4401°N 88.8039°W	19:05–19:25	14.33 mi (23.06 km)	50 yd (46 m)
EF0	A barn collapsed and a shed was lofted and destroyed.						
EF1	SSW of Darien	Walworth	WI	42.5814°N 88.7242°W	19:18–19:21	0.98 mi (1.58 km)	50 yd (46 m)
EF1	A horse stable was damaged.						
EF1	Northwestern Dowagiac to SE of Decatur	Cass	MI	41.995°N 86.1227°W	21:11–21:38	11.71 mi (18.85 km)	950 yd (870 m)
EF1	This large tornado first touched down north of the Dowagiac Municipal Airport and moved northeastward, damaging trees, including a few large trees that were uprooted and fell onto homes. The tornado then snapped a power pole and flipped a few center pivots into a field adjacent to Amtrak's Michigan Line. After crossing the railroad, the tornado reached its peak width and snapped hundreds of trees in the Twin Lakes area. The tornado continued to snap trees and damaged a barn before dissipating at the Cass/Van Buren County line.						
EF2	Southern Centreville to NE of Sherwood	St. Joseph, Branch	MI	41.9132°N 85.5258°W	21:41–22:11	19.53 mi (31.43 km)	1,200 yd (1,100 m)
EF2	This large, strong high-end EF2 tornado caused extensive damage to trees, center pivot irrigation systems, and homes. The peak damage occurred between Colon and Sherwood where several homes suffered loss of roof and walls. Outbuildings were severely damaged or destroyed as well. A tornado emergency was issued for this tornado, the first time such an alert had ever been issued in Michigan.						
EF2	Portage	Kalamazoo	MI	42.19°N 85.67°W	21:55–22:17	10.86 mi (17.48 km)	300 yd (270 m)
EF2	Many homes had roof and/or siding damage by this strong high-end EF2 tornado. Two mobile home parks were hit with several mobile homes being destroyed. Businesses and apartments were damaged and the left middle section of the roof of a FedEx warehouse collapsed as well. Sixteen people were injured.						
EF1	SSW of Union City	Branch	MI	42.0248°N 85.1797°W	22:07–22:08	1.09 mi (1.75 km)	100 yd (91 m)
EF1	This satellite tornado to the Sherwood EF2 tornado destroyed an outbuilding. Strong RFD winds occurred between the two tornado paths.						
EFU	WNW of Angola	Steuben	IN	41.6573°N 85.0702°W	22:11–22:12	0.05 mi (0.080 km)	1 yd (0.91 m)
EFU	A brief tornado touched down over an open field, causing no damage.						
EFU	NE of Richland, Rush County, Indiana	Rush	IN	39.5133°N 85.3875°W	23:47–23:53	0.77 mi (1.24 km)	30 yd (27 m)
EFU	A tornado was recorded by a nearby resident and caused small swirls in a soybean field.						
EF2	NNW of Fort Recovery to E of Erastus	Mercer	OH	40.4646°N 84.7917°W	23:50–00:08	8.14 mi (13.10 km)	400 yd (370 m)
EF2	A strong tornado severely damaged or destroyed several large outbuildings. A few homes sustained significant roof damage while a few others sustained more minor damage. Numerous trees were snapped or uprooted.						
EF0	NE of Middletown	Shelby	IN	39.4703°N 85.6448°W	00:02–00:03	0.78 mi (1.26 km)	50 yd (46 m)
EF0	Numerous trees were snapped or uprooted. Nearby homes suffered minor loss of shingles or gutters. A very old barn sustained some roof damage.						
EF1	N of St. Paul to SSE of Moscow	Rush	IN	39.4621°N 85.629°W	00:03–00:15	4.63 mi (7.45 km)	75 yd (69 m)
EF1	A brief tornado caused damage to a metal barn.						
EF1	WSW of Moscow	Rush	IN	39.4699°N 85.5851°W	00:05–00:06	0.16 mi (0.26 km)	30 yd (27 m)
EF1	Several trees were snapped and one barn had part of its metal roofing peeled back and tossed.						
EF1	Western Milton	Fayette, Wayne	IN	39.772°N 85.2022°W	00:08–00:13	2.92 mi (4.70 km)	150 yd (140 m)
EF1	Numerous trees were snapped or uprooted.						
EF1	E of Broughton to southern Melrose	Paulding	OH	41.0803°N 84.5152°W	00:09–00:14	6.16 mi (9.91 km)	300 yd (270 m)
EF1	The most intense damage occurred as this tornado touched down, sliding an unanchored home 18 feet (5.5 m) off its foundation into a barn. The tornado continued to cause damage as it moved eastward through the south side of Melrose before dissipating.						
EF0	N of Oakwood	Paulding	OH	41.1605°N 84.3897°W	00:16–00:17	0.47 mi (0.76 km)	25 yd (23 m)
EF0	Metal roof panels were ripped from an outbuilding.						
EF2	NNE of Sebastian to NNW of Lock Two	Mercer, Auglaize	OH	40.4722°N 84.5073°W	00:20–00:33	6.4 mi (10.3 km)	300 yd (270 m)
EF2	A strong tornado inflicted significant damage to two homes that lost their roofs and portions of their walls, especially on the second floor. Significant damage also occurred to trees and outbuildings.						
EF1	Greenville to NNE of Gettysburg	Darke	OH	40.0958°N 84.7025°W	00:24–00:42	11.65 mi (18.75 km)	800 yd (730 m)
EF1	A tornado moved through northern Greenville, mainly ripping shingles and siding from many homes. The high school football field and outbuildings along the path also sustained structural damage. Numerous trees were snapped or uprooted.						
EF0	N of Clarksburg	Decatur	IN	39.4395°N 85.3909°W	00:25–00:29	4.48 mi (7.21 km)	100 yd (91 m)
EF0	Larger tree branches were broken and utility poles were damaged.						
EF0	SW of Sulphur Springs	Crawford	IN	38.209°N 86.4863°W	00:42–00:43	0.18 mi (0.29 km)	80 yd (73 m)
EF0	A weak tornado destroyed the lean-to of a small barn, threw a carport about 75 yd (69 m), and snapped or uprooted trees.						
EFU	NE of Leipsic	Putnam	OH	41.1227°N 83.9431°W	00:54–00:55	0.06 mi (0.097 km)	5 yd (4.6 m)
EFU	A trained storm spotter reported a very brief tornado; it did not cause damage.						
EF1	WNW of Whitcomb, IN to SW of Oxford, OH	Franklin (IN), Butler (OH)	IN, OH	39.4624°N 84.9587°W	00:56–01:09	7.96 mi (12.81 km)	300 yd (270 m)
EF1	A tornado moved through the Hickory Woods Campground, snapping or uprooting numerous trees. Numerous camping units and manufactured homes were overturned as well. One home had its roof completely removed and a portion of its second story exterior wall collapsed. Outbuildings and barns along the path were damaged as well.						
EF1	SSE of Oxford to McGonigle	Butler	OH	39.4525°N 84.7276°W	01:20–01:25	2.38 mi (3.83 km)	200 yd (180 m)
EF1	Two outbuildings were destroyed, a home sustained significant roof and garage damage, and trees were downed.						
EF0	NE of Bennettsville	Clark	IN	38.4365°N 85.789°W	01:23–01:26	1.19 mi (1.92 km)	60 yd (55 m)
EF0	This tornado damaged six homes, affecting shingles and roofing. Debris from the houses landed into homes in Sellersburg, including shingles, particle board, and one impressive 2x4 impalement into the side of a house about 9 ft (2.7 m) above the ground.						
EF0	Southeastern Middletown	Butler	OH	39.4759°N 84.3437°W	01:57–01:58	0.28 mi (0.45 km)	80 yd (73 m)
EF0	A brief tornado caused damage to trees and the roofs and siding of structures. A few semi-trailers were overturned or briefly lifted.						
EF0	WNW of Morrow	Warren	OH	39.4045°N 84.2530°W	02:05–02:07	0.33 mi (0.53 km)	100 yd (91 m)
EF0	Multiple trees were snapped or uprooted.						
EF1	South Lebanon to SE of Lebanon	Warren	OH	39.3728°N 84.2130°W	02:08–02:12	2.64 mi (4.25 km)	150 yd (140 m)
EF1	A tornado caused generally minor roof damage, except to one residence that had the roof of its detached garage completely removed and wall partially collapsed. Trees were damaged as well.						
EF0	E of Lebanon	Warren	OH	39.4279°N 84.1794°W	02:14–02:15	0.43 mi (0.69 km)	50 yd (46 m)
EF0	A tornado downed trees and power poles near SR 123.						
EF1	Eastern Morrow	Warren	OH	39.3547°N 84.1290°W	02:15–02:20	2.73 mi (4.39 km)	350 yd (320 m)
EF1	Several homes sustained damage, including a home that sustained the complete removal of its second story and another with partial removal of its roof. Extensive tree damage was observed.						
EF0	WSW of Pansy	Clinton	OH	39.3147°N 83.986°W	02:27–02:29	1.34 mi (2.16 km)	80 yd (73 m)
EF0	A brief tornado caused damage to trees and outbuildings.						
EF0	N of Middleboro	Warren	OH	39.3907°N 84.0272°W	02:27–02:28	0.51 mi (0.82 km)	150 yd (140 m)
EF0	A pole barn was destroyed and had its debris tossed downstream. A home sustained partial roof removal. Numerous trees were snapped or uprooted.						
EF0	E of St. Louisville to N of Hanover	Licking	OH	40.1703°N 82.3427°W	03:49–03:53	3.04 mi (4.89 km)	100 yd (91 m)
EF0	This tornado damaged outbuildings, a barn and snapped multiple trees.						

=== May 8 event ===
List of confirmed tornadoes – Wednesday, May 8, 2024
EF#	Location	County / Parish	State	Start Coord.	Time (UTC)	Path length	Max width
EF1	N of Frazeysburg	Muskingum	OH	40.1577°N 82.1238°W	04:02–04:03	0.42 mi (0.68 km)	128 yd (117 m)
EF1	A brief tornado heavily damaged or destroyed outbuildings, caused roof and exterior damage to homes, snapped wooden poles, and snapped or uprooted trees.						
EF1	SE of Wakatomika	Coshocton	OH	40.1779°N 82.0079°W	04:17–04:19	0.09 mi (0.14 km)	197 yd (180 m)
EF1	A brief tornado heavily damaged trees, homes, and outbuildings. This is the first recorded tornado in Coshocton County since 1985.						
EF2	WNW of Irondale, OH to N of New Manchester, WV to SSW of Hookstown, PA	Jefferson (OH), Hancock (WV), Beaver (PA)	OH, WV, PA	40.5834°N 80.8012°W	04:54–05:17	15.32 mi (24.66 km)	200 yd (180 m)
EF2	A significant tornado initially touched down in northwestern Jefferson County, Ohio, uprooting and snapping many hardwood trees. Near County Highway 55, a mobile home was overturned and several homes were unroofed. The tornado tracked across the center of Irondale, uprooting or snapping numerous trees at EF2 intensity, including some trees that fell on and damaged homes. The tornado then crossed the Ohio River into Hancock County, West Virginia, becoming the first tornado on record for that county. There, the tornado reached its peak strength as a high-end EF2 tornado, inflicting widespread damage to trees and structures. Several barns and outbuildings were destroyed and homes were fully unroofed. Multiple trees were uprooted in western Beaver County, Pennsylvania, before the tornado lifted. Across its path, the tornado traversed mountainous terrain, including a 100 ft (30 m) tall escarpment.						
EF2	SW of Rockwell to southern Hot Springs	Garland	AR	34.393°N 93.198°W	05:30–05:56	12.2 mi (19.6 km)	600 yd (550 m)
EF2	A strong tornado caused damage to multiple commercial, industrial, and residential buildings; mainly to their siding, doors, windows, and roofs. Several manufactured homes were damaged, including several that were pushed off their blocks and one that was overturned. On Lake Hamilton, several floating docks were damaged and multiple large condos had large portions of their roofing structures removed. Additional homes were severely damaged by the numerous trees that were snapped or uprooted.						
EF1	ENE of Imperial-Enlow	Allegheny	PA	40.4623°N 80.1968°W	05:49–05:50	0.2 mi (0.32 km)	150 yd (140 m)
EF1	A brief high-end EF1 tornado overturned a trailer and damaged some trees. A nearby outbuilding also lost a metal roof.						
EF1	N of Ligonier	Westmoreland	PA	40.2986°N 79.2485°W	07:09–07:11	1.14 mi (1.83 km)	200 yd (180 m)
EF1	A tornado snapped and uprooted numerous trees.						
EF0	N of East Cape Girardeau	Cape Girardeau	MO	37.3535°N 89.4773°W	15:58–15:59	0.19 mi (0.31 km)	50 yd (46 m)
EF0	Several large tree branches were broken and a mobile home had some minor damage. A resident's outdoor camera captured the brief tornado on video.						
EF1	NW of Cuba	Crawford	MO	38.137°N 91.477°W	16:04–16:08	2.24 mi (3.60 km)	75 yd (69 m)
EF1	Trees were damaged.						
EF1	Cora	Jackson	IL	37.8067°N 89.6716°W	17:01–17:03	1.26 mi (2.03 km)	100 yd (91 m)
EF1	Numerous trees were damaged, a couple of barns and a carport were destroyed, and a manufactured home was slid about 1 ft (0.30 m) off its foundation. A few homes sustained roof, siding, and fascia damage. One person was injured by a falling tree limb outside.						
EFU	SSW of Sharon Springs	Wallace	KS	38.7786°N 101.7787°W	18:53–18:55	0.06 mi (0.097 km)	50 yd (46 m)
EFU	A landspout tornado occurred over open land.						
EF1	N of Polkville to Cherryville to N of Bessemer City	Cleveland, Gaston	NC	35.433°N 81.651°W	19:00–19:38	21.34 mi (34.34 km)	100 yd (91 m)
EF1	This tornado developed to the north of Polkville snapping and uprooting trees as it passed through Lawndale and south of Fallston. The tornado reached its peak intensity of high-end EF1 as it moved through Cherryville, snapping and uprooting numerous trees. The tornado continued to down trees before dissipating north of Bessemer City.						
EFU	WNW of Narcissa	Ottawa	OK	36.824°N 94.991°W	19:10	0.1 mi (0.16 km)	75 yd (69 m)
EFU	Storm chasers reported a brief tornado.						
EFU	NW of Narcissa	Ottawa	OK	36.827°N 94.972°W	19:12	0.1 mi (0.16 km)	75 yd (69 m)
EFU	Storm chasers reported a brief tornado.						
EF1	NNW of Narcissa to S of Miami	Ottawa	OK	36.8288°N 94.9499°W	19:15–19:23	4 mi (6.4 km)	450 yd (410 m)
EF1	An outbuilding was destroyed, a few homes were damaged, and numerous trees were snapped or uprooted.						
EF1	Northern Gastonia to northern Belmont	Gaston	NC	35.281°N 81.21°W	19:40–19:50	8.22 mi (13.23 km)	60 yd (55 m)
EF1	Numerous trees were snapped or uprooted. Several buildings and a warehouse sustained minor roof damage. Multiple power poles were snapped.						
EF1	Stroudville	Robertson	TN	36.4717°N 87.1022°W	19:43–19:49	2.2 mi (3.5 km)	200 yd (180 m)
EF1	Sheeting and panels were ripped from a barn. Another older barn was thrown downstream. Three homes lost shingles and roofing material in addition to sustaining damage to their gutters and soffit. Numerous trees were snapped or uprooted, including one that fell onto a home.						
EF1	NW of Seneca, MO	Ottawa	OK	36.8601°N 94.6379°W	19:51–19:52	0.3 mi (0.48 km)	60 yd (55 m)
EF1	Several homes were damaged and trees were uprooted.						
EF1	E of Boskydell to S of Carterville	Jackson, Williamson	IL	37.6647°N 89.1739°W	20:10–20:26	4.56 mi (7.34 km)	75 yd (69 m)
EF1	A large tree was uprooted and numerous tree limbs were damaged or downed. A barn sustained roof damage.						
EFU	SSW of Tyler	McCracken	KY	37.0176°N 88.6001°W	21:01–21:02	0.2 mi (0.32 km)	50 yd (46 m)
EFU	This brief tornado was filmed and witnessed by several people. No damage was caused.						
EF0	N of Goreville to southern Creal Springs	Williamson	IL	37.6031°N 88.959°W	21:04–21:11	6.57 mi (10.57 km)	25 yd (23 m)
EF0	A weak tornado caused intermittent damage to tree limbs and uprooted a few trees.						
EF1	SSW of Ledford to Somerset	Saline	IL	37.677°N 88.5875°W	21:11–21:26	7.74 mi (12.46 km)	150 yd (140 m)
EF1	Several dozen trees were snapped or uprooted. A few homes and barns sustained minor roof damage, while one house was slightly shifted off its foundation.						
EFU	S of Cavour	Beadle	SD	44.28°N 98.03°W	21:15	unknown	unknown
EFU	A landspout was recorded and photographed.						
EF1	E of Monett to SE of Aurora	Barry, Lawrence	MO	36.91°N 93.89°W	21:25–21:46	10.77 mi (17.33 km)	150 yd (140 m)
EF1	A manufactured home was overturned, some roofs were damaged, and several trees were snapped or uprooted.						
EF3	Columbia to SW of Lunns Store	Maury, Marshall	TN	35.6095°N 87.0007°W	22:37–23:07	11.53 mi (18.56 km)	900 yd (820 m)
EF3	1 death – See section on this tornado – 12 people were injured.						
EF0	S of Rockvale	Rutherford	TN	35.6936°N 86.5033°W	23:32–23:36	2.96 mi (4.76 km)	100 yd (91 m)
EF0	Trees were uprooted, and large tree branches were snapped.						
EF0	NNW of Sumner	Lamar	TX	33.8013°N 95.7045°W	00:40	0.01 mi (0.016 km)	30 yd (27 m)
EF0	Small tree branches were broken.						
EF2	WSW of Prospect to WNW of Ardmore	Giles	TN	35.0232°N 87.0405°W	00:50–01:00	5.88 mi (9.46 km)	600 yd (550 m)
EF2	A manufactured home was completely removed from its base and demolished. Additional frame homes sustained roof damage. Numerous trees were damaged as well. One person was injured.						
EF1	S of Lester	Limestone	AL	34.8932°N 87.155°W	01:11–01:26	4.77 mi (7.68 km)	90 yd (82 m)
EF1	Large trees were snapped or uprooted.						
EF1	NE of Taft	Lincoln	TN	35.0728°N 86.7742°W	01:15–01:33	6.22 mi (10.01 km)	160 yd (150 m)
EF1	Numerous trees were snapped or uprooted. One home sustained minor roof damage.						
EF3	SE of Rogersville	Lawrence, Limestone	AL	34.7367°N 87.2176°W	01:23–01:30	3.76 mi (6.05 km)	228 yd (208 m)
EF3	Numerous trees were snapped or uprooted in Lawrence County before this tornado crossed Wheeler Lake into the Brigadoon neighborhood of Limestone County, briefly causing low-end EF3 damage along the lakeshore. One home had all of its exterior walls that were facing the lake along with its two-story four-car garage collapsed as well as partial roof loss. Other nearby homes suffered substantial roof and exterior damage, and vehicles were damaged. The tornado then weakened, continuing to shatter windows, cause roof and exterior damage to homes, and knock down fences before dissipating in a field outside of the subdivision. Many large trees were snapped or uprooted along the path.						
EF0	S of Pin Hook	Lamar	TX	33.8012°N 95.3225°W	01:27–01:28	0.32 mi (0.51 km)	30 yd (27 m)
EF0	A short-lived tornado damaged some small tree limbs and tin metal.						
EF1	SW of Annapolis	Reynolds, Iron, Madison	MO	37.303°N 90.761°W	01:44–01:58	14.07 mi (22.64 km)	150 yd (140 m)
EF1	This tornado broke numerous tree limbs and uprooted a large tree in Reynolds County, before intensifying as it crossed into Iron County. Numerous trees were snapped or uprooted and a house sustained minor shingle damage. The tornado dissipated quickly after crossing into Madison County, shortly after uprooting a few more trees.						
EF1	NE of Elkmont	Limestone	AL	34.9458°N 86.9254°W	01:45–01:50	3.47 mi (5.58 km)	225 yd (206 m)
EF1	More than half of a private aircraft hangar was collapsed. A few shingles were displaced from a home's roof. Multiple trees were snapped or uprooted.						
EF1	Annapolis	Iron	MO	37.36°N 90.706°W	01:49–01:51	2.56 mi (4.12 km)	250 yd (230 m)
EF1	This tornado touched down just west of Annapolis and quickly entered town. A manufactured home lost most of its roofing and the elementary school had a large section its roof ripped off, several walls blown over and numerous windows broken. The tornado exited Annapolis and continued snapping and uprooting trees before dissipating.						
EF0	NNE of Vulcan	Iron	MO	37.347°N 90.669°W	01:50–01:51	0.59 mi (0.95 km)	75 yd (69 m)
EF0	A brief tornado uprooted and snapped several large trees.						
EF1	NW of Brunot	Iron	MO	37.333°N 90.59°W	01:53–01:56	1.67 mi (2.69 km)	150 yd (140 m)
EF1	Multiple trees were snapped and/or uprooted.						
EF1	Arcadia to NNW of Oak Grove	Iron, Madison	MO	37.592°N 90.63°W	02:01–02:09	12.01 mi (19.33 km)	150 yd (140 m)
EF1	A tornado touched down in Arcadia, snapping trees throughout the town. After exiting town, the tornado continued to snap or uproot trees through rural portions of Iron and Madison counties.						
EF1	Arcadia	Iron	MO	37.585°N 90.635°W	02:01–02:04	4.08 mi (6.57 km)	100 yd (91 m)
EF1	A second tornado touched down in Arcadia, this time in the southwestern portion of town. Trees were snapped and uprooted.						
EF1	WSW of Flintville	Lincoln	TN	35.0497°N 86.4921°W	02:02–02:06	1.38 mi (2.22 km)	286 yd (262 m)
EF1	Almost 75 percent of the roof was ripped from a home, while the entire roof and some rafters were torn from a large storage shed. Another home was damaged, trees were uprooted, and a power pole was toppled as well.						
EF0	Fredericktown	Madison	MO	37.545°N 90.361°W	02:06–02:10	4.27 mi (6.87 km)	334 yd (305 m)
EF0	Homes and farm outbuildings sustained minor damage. Trees were damaged as well.						
EF0	Northern Madison	Madison	AL	34.7411°N 86.7364°W	02:07–02:11	1.73 mi (2.78 km)	95 yd (87 m)
EF0	This high-end EF0 tornado snapped or uprooted numerous trees. Two homes were damaged by falling trees.						
EF2	Huntsville to W of Gurley	Madison	AL	34.7384°N 86.5804°W	02:28–02:48	9.51 mi (15.30 km)	550 yd (500 m)
EF2	This strong tornado snapped or uprooted numerous trees, partially uplifted the roofs of four houses, and caused shingle damage to additional homes along its track.						
EF0	N of Saint Joseph	Daviess	KY	37.7112°N 87.3633°W	02:39–02:42	2.66 mi (4.28 km)	50 yd (46 m)
EF0	A few hog barns sustained roof damage, a house had a few shingles removed, and numerous large tree limbs were downed.						
EF0	WNW of Saint Joseph to West Louisville	Daviess	KY	37.7063°N 87.3431°W	02:41–02:46	3.11 mi (5.01 km)	300 yd (270 m)
EF0	This tornado was a twin to the above tornado. A few barn outbuildings had portions of their roofs removed. One outbuilding had a portion of its exterior wall destroyed as well. A few wooden power poles were damaged or leaned, a carport was tossed, and numerous trees were snapped or uprooted.						
EF1	SW of Owensboro	Daviess	KY	37.7292°N 87.182°W	02:49–02:50	0.86 mi (1.38 km)	100 yd (91 m)
EF1	A farm outbuilding were severely damaged and its accompanying heavy machinery was tossed or pushed into nearby fields. A grain bin and additional outbuildings sustained damage as well. Multiple trees were snapped.						
EF0	NE of Woodville	Jackson	AL	34.6807°N 86.2279°W	03:13–03:16	2.28 mi (3.67 km)	106 yd (97 m)
EF0	A high-end EF0 tornado caused tree damage.						
EF1	SW of Tails Creek	Gilmer	GA	34.6724°N 84.6408°W	03:26–03:28	0.76 mi (1.22 km)	200 yd (180 m)
EF1	Hundreds of trees were snapped or uprooted.						
EF0	Northern Huntsville	Madison	AL	34.7624°N 86.6427°W	03:32–03:44	3.53 mi (5.68 km)	145 yd (133 m)
EF0	A very weak tornado caused sporadic trees and inflicted minor roof damage to a home.						
EF0	Scottsboro	Jackson	AL	34.6864°N 86.064°W	03:34–03:37	2.09 mi (3.36 km)	200 yd (180 m)
EF0	This high-end EF0 tornado snapped trees and peeled metal roofing and siding from a few structures.						
EF1	Eastern Huntsville	Madison	AL	34.723°N 86.5598°W	03:40–03:53	4.35 mi (7.00 km)	200 yd (180 m)
EF1	Multiple trees were snapped or uprooted, some of which caused damage to at least two homes upon falling. The tornado track was just south of the EF2 tornado that impacted Huntsville just an hour earlier.						
EF1	Peachtree	Cherokee	NC	35.0917°N 83.9532°W	03:41–03:42	2.33 mi (3.75 km)	40 yd (37 m)
EF1	A brief tornado snapped or uprooted numerous trees.						
EF1	SW of East Ellijay	Gilmer	GA	34.6641°N 84.5084°W	03:42–03:44	0.64 mi (1.03 km)	150 yd (140 m)
EF1	Parts of two single-story storage units, as well as a Georgia Forestry building, were destroyed. Additional structures sustained minor roof damage, and a few trees were snapped.						
EF0	N of Ellijay	Gilmer	GA	34.7428°N 84.5015°W	03:46–03:48	0.98 mi (1.58 km)	250 yd (230 m)
EF0	Numerous trees were snapped or uprooted, some of which fell onto homes.						
EF0	SE of East Ellijay	Gilmer	GA	34.666°N 84.4484°W	03:51–03:54	1.94 mi (3.12 km)	200 yd (180 m)
EF0	Numerous trees were snapped or uprooted.						
EF3	S of Pisgah to NW of Hammondville	Jackson, DeKalb	AL	34.6407°N 85.8578°W	03:57–04:24	12.34 mi (19.86 km)	880 yd (800 m)
EF3	See section on this tornado – Seven people were injured.						

=== May 9 event ===
List of confirmed tornadoes – Thursday, May 9, 2024
EF#	Location	County / Parish	State	Start Coord.	Time (UTC)	Path length	Max width
EF1	SSE of Tuckasegee	Jackson	NC	35.246°N 83.259°W	04:14–04:27	9.38 mi (15.10 km)	400 yd (370 m)
EF1	A high-end EF1 tornado occurred in the Appalachian Mountains where numerous trees were snapped or uprooted.						
EF0	Black Mountain	Buncombe	NC	35.642°N 82.349°W	04:16–04:18	2.32 mi (3.73 km)	30 yd (27 m)
EF0	Numerous trees were snapped or uprooted. Several homes sustained damage from fallen trees. A communications tower at the Black Mountain fire station was toppled.						
EF1	SSW of Tuckasegee	Jackson	NC	35.207°N 83.152°W	04:23–04:26	1.52 mi (2.45 km)	200 yd (180 m)
EF1	A brief tornado downed several trees and snapped numerous large branches.						
EF1	SW of Henagar	DeKalb	AL	34.605°N 85.812°W	05:02–05:05	1.96 mi (3.15 km)	100 yd (91 m)
EF1	A high-end EF1 tornado tracked just to the south of the Henager EF3 tornado. Numerous trees were snapped or uprooted, including some that fell on and damaged structures.						
EF0	ENE of Holladay	Benton	TN	35.8901°N 88.0419°W	06:39–06:41	1.31 mi (2.11 km)	100 yd (91 m)
EF0	This intermittent tornado damaged a few trees before lifting.						
EF0	S of Whitmire	Newberry	SC	34.49°N 81.63°W	06:46–06:51	3.01 mi (4.84 km)	150 yd (140 m)
EF0	A weak tornado caused scattered tree damage.						
EF0	NE of Monticello	Fairfield	SC	34.37°N 81.28°W	07:12–07:14	0.34 mi (0.55 km)	50 yd (46 m)
EF0	Multiple trees were snapped or downed.						
EF1	S of Ridgeway	Fairfield	SC	34.27°N 81°W	07:31–07:36	1.89 mi (3.04 km)	250 yd (230 m)
EF1	Numerous trees were snapped or uprooted. One tree fell on a home, causing damage to its roof, siding, and gutters.						
EF1	WNW of Fayetteville	Lincoln	TN	35.1939°N 86.765°W	08:44–08:50	4.21 mi (6.78 km)	105 yd (96 m)
EF1	A home lost about a quarter of its roof. Two barn structures were heavily damaged while a third had a small portion of its roof ripped off. Numerous trees were snapped or uprooted.						
EF1	SE of Kirkland, TN to ESE of New Market, AL	Lincoln (TN), Madison (AL)	TN, AL	34.9732°N 86.5342°W	09:01–09:19	13.65 mi (21.97 km)	215 yd (197 m)
EF1	This tornado first touched down in the Eastwood Estates in Tennessee, causing structural damage to a manufactured home and uprooting numerous trees. After splitting and uprooting additional trees as it moved southeastward, the tornado crossed into Alabama north of Hazel Green, uprooting a large tree and snapping large tree branches. The tornado then moved east-southeastward, uprooting a tree that fell on, and caused roof damage to a home. After, turning back to the southeast and uprooting additional trees, snapping more large tree limbs, and inflicting shingle damage to homes, the tornado moved through the small community of New Market. Large tree limbs were snapped, and trees were uprooting in the town. The tornado then continued first east-southward and then southeastward out of New Market, sporadically snapping large tree limbs before dissipating.						
EF1	SW of Flintville, TN to SW of Elora, TN	Lincoln (TN), Madison (AL)	TN, AL	35.0422°N 86.4595°W	09:06–09:16	6.06 mi (9.75 km)	300 yd (270 m)
EF1	Numerous trees were snapped and uprooted. The tornado dissipated almost immediately after crossing Tennessee-Alabama state line.						
EF1	E of Flintville to S of Huntland	Lincoln, Franklin	TN	35.0665°N 86.3928°W	09:10–09:23	9.23 mi (14.85 km)	194 yd (177 m)
EF1	A pole barn was destroyed, and numerous trees were snapped and uprooted. Further analysis of the tornado via drone footage and satellite imagery is planned to determine if the tornado's path was longer than currently indicated.						
EF1	WNW of Skyline	Jackson	AL	34.8506°N 86.239°W	09:31–09:32	0.3 mi (0.48 km)	108 yd (99 m)
EF1	Numerous trees, including large trees, were snapped or uprooted. A manufactured home was shifted 10–15 ft (3.0–4.6 m) from its original location, and more than half of its roof was destroyed. One person was injured.						
EF1	N of Skyline	Jackson	AL	34.8664°N 86.1027°W	09:37–09:42	1.06 mi (1.71 km)	170 yd (160 m)
EF1	Trees were snapped or uprooted, one of which caused roof damage to a home upon falling. Satellite imagery was used to determine the starting point of the tornado, which was further to the northwest than originally thought.						
EF1	Pisgah to NW of Sylvania	Jackson	AL	34.6949°N 85.8559°W	10:08–10:17	6.06 mi (9.75 km)	241 yd (220 m)
EF1	A tornado began in Pisgah, where several large limbs were snapped off of trees. The tornado moved due south snapping and uprooting numerous more trees, before crossing the path of the Henagar EF3 tornado. The tornado lifted shortly after intersecting the path.						
EF1	SE of Cochran to SE of Plainfield	Dodge	GA	32.3056°N 83.2747°W	16:50–17:00	12.2 mi (19.6 km)	150 yd (140 m)
EF1	This tornado caused significant damage, ripping the roofs off of small structures, damaging homes and snapping or uprooting trees.						
EF0	N of Jay Bird Springs to SSE of Cedar Grove	Laurens	GA	32.2267°N 83.0107°W	17:06–17:17	8.61 mi (13.86 km)	100 yd (91 m)
EF0	A few trees were snapped as this tornado moved through rural and wooded areas.						
EF0	NNE of McRae to Alamo	Wheeler	GA	32.1536°N 82.8758°W	17:18–17:25	7.18 mi (11.56 km)	150 yd (140 m)
EF0	This tornado initially only snapped and uprooted trees before striking Alamo. In Alamo, the tornado damaged a small outbuilding, a canopy and a light pole, and broke the glass windows of a retail store. Some fences were downed as well.						
EF1	S of Kibbee to Vidalia to Lyons	Montgomery, Toombs	GA	32.2466°N 82.5416°W	17:39–17:54	14.66 mi (23.59 km)	250 yd (230 m)
EF1	Numerous trees were snapped or uprooted, many of which fell onto homes, outbuildings, and vehicles. A roof was peeled off one structure. Minor damage was inflicted at an elementary, a middle, and a high school, mainly to trees, fences, and some storage building doors.						
EF0	S of Charles City	Floyd	IA	43.0222°N 92.6716°W	18:03–18:05	0.63 mi (1.01 km)	30 yd (27 m)
EF0	A brief landspout tornado was well-documented and did not cause damage.						
EF1	ESE of North Hills	Wood	WV	39.2763°N 81.3898°W	00:19–00:21	3.4 mi (5.5 km)	250 yd (230 m)
EF1	A manufactured home and a barn were flipped over, causing minor injury to an occupant of the home. Trees were snapped or uprooted.						
EF0	N of Masontown	Preston	WV	39.571°N 79.801°W	00:55–00:56	0.43 mi (0.69 km)	50 yd (46 m)
EF0	A home had nearly half its roof removed. Trees were snapped or downed, one of which fell on a vehicle.						
EF0	NE of Edwards to Bolton	Hinds	MS	32.3659°N 90.5406°W	03:11–03:21	4.86 mi (7.82 km)	105 yd (96 m)
EF0	Large trees were snapped or uprooted.						

=== May 10 event ===
List of confirmed tornadoes – Friday, May 10, 2024
EF#	Location	County / Parish	State	Start Coord.	Time (UTC)	Path length	Max width
EF2	SW of Old Texas to Georgiana	Monroe, Conecuh, Butler	AL	31.7143°N 87.0641°W	07:03–07:25	24.24 mi (39.01 km)	1,200 yd (1,100 m)
EF2	This long-track, multi-vortex EF2 tornado began southwest of Old Texas, Alabama, and traveled east-southeast through Georgiana. Initially intensifying to EF2 strength, it caused widespread tree snaps and uproots, particularly in a forested area. The tornado developed multiple sub-vortices, some reaching EF1 to EF2 intensity, leading to significant tree damage across its large width. It briefly weakened before causing more tree damage and flipping a manufactured home near a highway. The tornado narrowed and weakened further as it approached Georgiana, with its final damage observed in the destruction of outbuildings and uprooted trees east of the town. No tornado warning was issued for this storm.						
EF2	SE of Jay to Munson to NW of Baker	Santa Rosa, Okaloosa	FL	30.93°N 87.12°W	08:41–09:04	24.9 mi (40.1 km)	1,000 yd (910 m)
EF2	This low-end EF2 tornado began southeast of Jay, tracking east-southeast and initially causing a narrow path of significant tree damage. As it intensified, the tornado caused extensive deforestation, snapping pine and oak trees and downing power lines in a convergent pattern, especially near Munson. The tornado broadened into a multi-vortex system east of Munson, continuing to cause tree damage as it crossed into Okaloosa County before dissipating.						
EFU	E of New York to NNW of Allentown	Santa Rosa	FL	30.824°N 87.1358°W	08:42–08:46	4.48 mi (7.21 km)	30 yd (27 m)
EFU	A tornado snapped trees before it dissipated just before reaching a highway. The exact intensity of the tornado is yet to be determined pending higher resolution imagery.						
EFU	ENE of Allentown	Santa Rosa	FL	30.8071°N 86.9828°W	08:50–08:51	0.7 mi (1.1 km)	30 yd (27 m)
EFU	This tornado caused damage in a dense forest that was discovered via satellite imagery. The intensity of the tornado may be able to be evaluated depending on higher resolution satellite imagery.						
EFU	S of Munson	Santa Rosa	FL	30.7886°N 86.9177°W	08:54–08:58	3.16 mi (5.09 km)	30 yd (27 m)
EFU	A tornado tracked entirely through forested areas and was found from satellite imagery. The intensity of the tornado is yet to be determined pending further analysis of higher resolution imagery.						
EF0	SE of Dothan to N of Cottonwood	Houston	AL	31.1212°N 85.3588°W	09:02–09:20	4.43 mi (7.13 km)	125 yd (114 m)
EF0	Outbuildings were significantly damaged and farm buildings were damaged as well.						
EFU	SE of Crestview	Okaloosa	FL	30.7271°N 86.5168°W	09:16–09:18	2.51 mi (4.04 km)	30 yd (27 m)
EFU	This tornado caused a narrow path of damage in forested areas south of I-10 near Crestview. It was confirmed from satellite imagery and its intensity may be able to be determined depending on higher resolution imagery.						
EF0	SW of Mossy Head	Walton	FL	30.69°N 86.37°W	09:25–09:28	3.15 mi (5.07 km)	25 yd (23 m)
EF0	A tornado occurred in the northeastern area of Eglin Air Force Base. Minor tree and vegetation damage occurred.						
EF0	E of Freeport	Walton	FL	30.48°N 86.07°W	09:47–09:49	1.38 mi (2.22 km)	25 yd (23 m)
EF0	A brief tornado damaged trees.						
EF2	S of Gretna to Tallahassee	Gadsden, Leon	FL	30.55°N 84.65°W	10:36–11:03	24.21 mi (38.96 km)	900 yd (820 m)
EF2	See article on this tornado						
EF1	NW of Bloxham to NNW of Natural Bridge	Leon	FL	30.399°N 84.636°W	10:42–11:13	31.44 mi (50.60 km)	1,100 yd (1,000 m)
EF1	This long-track, high-end EF1 tornado was the second of three simultaneous large tornadoes in Leon County. It snapped and uprooted numerous trees in the Apalachicola National Forest, many of which fell onto cars and homes.						
EF2	SSW of Midway to Tallahassee to SW of Lloyd	Leon, Jefferson	FL	30.44°N 84.49°W	10:50–11:14	24.81 mi (39.93 km)	1,400 yd (1,300 m)
EF2	2 deaths – See article on this tornado						
EF1	SW of Lamont to SE of Lee	Jefferson, Madison, Taylor	FL	30.3468°N 83.8326°W	11:31–12:02	37.52 mi (60.38 km)	1,300 yd (1,200 m)
EF1	The tornado initially caused EF0 damage in Jefferson County, twisting and snapping young pine trees. As it moved into Madison County, it intensified to EF1, uprooting trees and damaging a trailer. The tornado continued through rural areas, snapping and uprooting trees and damaging farmland irrigation systems before dissipating near the Madison-Suwannee county border.						

=== May 11 event ===
List of confirmed tornadoes – Saturday, May 11, 2024
EF#	Location	County / Parish	State	Start Coord.	Time (UTC)	Path length	Max width
EF0	W of Brimfield	Portage	OH	41.0929°N 81.3726°W	18:42–18:43	0.31 mi (0.50 km)	10 yd (9.1 m)
EF0	A very brief tornado ripped tiles from a footbridge and damaged trees.						
EFU	ENE of Jemez Springs	Sandoval	NM	35.82°N 106.58°W	18:53–18:54	0.25 mi (0.40 km)	50 yd (46 m)
EFU	A tornado was recorded in the Sierra Nacimientos but no damage was found on accessible roads. This tornado occurred roughly 8,150 ft (2.48 km) above sea level.						
EF2	Gastonville to S of Jefferson Hills	Washington	PA	40.27°N 80.06°W	22:06–22:19	5.84 mi (9.40 km)	200 yd (180 m)
EF2	Two garages were destroyed and had portions of their roof and walls tossed well downstream. Multiple homes sustained roof damage, including one that lost over half its roof. A church sustained significant roof damage and had its steeple toppled. Two occupants were injured by flying glass. Several sheds were severely damaged or destroyed. Numerous trees were snapped or uprooted. A power pole was snapped as well.						
EF0	SW of New Salem	Fayette	PA	39.91°N 79.86°W	23:06–23:07	0.53 mi (0.85 km)	20 yd (18 m)
EF0	A few hardwood trees had large branches down and a small tree was uprooted. No homes or structures were affected.						
EF1	NE of Glade Farms, WV	Fayette (PA), Preston (WV)	PA, WV	39.73°N 79.51°W	23:48–23:53	1.24 mi (2.00 km)	200 yd (180 m)
EF1	In Fayette County, several hardwood trees were uprooted and two barn doors were blown off. Worse damage was documented just across the state line in Preston County. Over 200 hardwood trees were downed. A roof was blown off, a tree fell on a car, and a trampoline was placed 30 ft (9.1 m) on top of a tree.						
EF1	SW of Markleysburg to N of Friendsville	Garrett	MD	39.7075°N 79.4735°W	23:55–23:59	3.05 mi (4.91 km)	75 yd (69 m)
EF1	Dozens of trees were snapped and uprooted near the West Virginia state line. The tornado continued on a path east-southeast uprooting and snapping more trees before lifting.						
EF1	E of Friendsville to NE of Accident	Garrett	MD	39.6647°N 79.3547°W	00:09–00:18	3.11 mi (5.01 km)	75 yd (69 m)
EF1	Hundreds of trees were snapped and uprooted with several trees falling on or very close to a couple of houses and trailers. At least one tree fell onto a vehicle. Several homes suffered minor shingle and siding damage nearby.						

=== May 12 event ===
List of confirmed tornadoes – Sunday, May 12, 2024
EF#	Location	County / Parish	State	Start Coord.	Time (UTC)	Path length	Max width
EFU	SE of Keyes	Cimarron	OK	36.76°N 102.18°W	19:07	unknown	unknown
EFU	Multiple reports and photos showed a landspout tornado.						
EFU	S of Eva	Texas	OK	36.76°N 101.9°W	19:20	unknown	unknown
EFU	A landspout occurred just south of US 412.						
EFU	WNW of McClave	Bent	CO	38.15°N 102.9°W	19:30	unknown	unknown
EFU	A landspout was photographed.						
EFU	N of Hasty	Bent	CO	38.18°N 102.97°W	20:05	unknown	unknown
EFU	Storm chasers photographed a landspout tornado over open land.						
EFU	WSW of St. Paul	Howard	NE	41.21°N 98.51°W	22:42–22:47	2.32 mi (3.73 km)	35 yd (32 m)
EFU	A tornado was reported over open country.						

=== May 13 event ===
List of confirmed tornadoes – Monday, May 13, 2024
EF#	Location	County / Parish	State	Start Coord.	Time (UTC)	Path length	Max width
EF1	SSW of Monticello	Lawrence	MS	31.4113°N 90.2088°W	08:32–08:33	0.51 mi (0.82 km)	280 yd (260 m)
EF1	A brief tornado developed within a swath of intense downburst winds, snapping and uprooting numerous trees. A church sustained roof damage and power lines were downed.						
EF1	S of Monticello	Lawrence	MS	31.444°N 90.1374°W	08:37–08:38	0.79 mi (1.27 km)	230 yd (210 m)
EF1	Another brief tornado in the same swath of intense downburst winds snapped and uprooted numerous trees.						
EF0	SE of Luther	Lincoln	OK	35.599°N 97.134°W	09:35	0.2 mi (0.32 km)	30 yd (27 m)
EF0	A very brief tornado removed part of the roof from a manufactured home.						
EFU	ENE of Santa Rosa Beach	Walton	FL	30.39°N 86.18°W	16:44–16:45	0.01 mi (0.016 km)	10 yd (9.1 m)
EFU	Originating a waterspout in Choctawhatchee Bay, it made landfall becoming a tornado and quickly dissipated. No damage occurred.						
EF1	E of Port Lavaca	Calhoun	TX	28.68°N 96.66°W	20:00–20:17	13.6 mi (21.9 km)	150 yd (140 m)
EF1	One home lost a significant portion of its metal roofing and had two of its windows blown out. Another house lost numerous shingles and had its porch roof entirely removed. Numerous trees were snapped and uprooted. The tornado continued across Matagorda Bay and dissipated south of Keller Bay.						
EF0	S of Kirbyville	Taney	MO	36.56°N 93.22°W	20:39–20:41	1.23 mi (1.98 km)	50 yd (46 m)
EF0	A brief tornado touched down on a golf course, snapping trees and tree branches.						
EF2	Eastern Sulphur	Calcasieu	LA	30.254°N 93.3475°W	21:41–21:45	3.44 mi (5.54 km)	200 yd (180 m)
EF2	Two warehouses were destroyed, a gas station awning was damaged, and portions of roofing were blown off several homes. Trees were snapped or uprooted and power lines were downed.						
EF1	Westlake to Lake Charles	Calcasieu	LA	30.2508°N 93.2794°W	21:45–21:53	6.47 mi (10.41 km)	300 yd (270 m)
EF1	Several homes and businesses sustained roof and exterior wall damage. Trees and power lines were downed as well.						
EF2	SSW of Cecilia to Henderson	St. Martin	LA	30.3266°N 91.8536°W	23:22–23:34	8.61 mi (13.86 km)	400 yd (370 m)
EF2	1 death – This tornado initially snapped or uprooted trees before rolling and destroying seven mobile homes and RVs at a mobile home park, killing one person and injuring another. After snapping additional trees and crossing I-10, it strengthened to EF2 intensity as it moved into Henderson, where several homes suffered major roof damage, including one home that was destroyed with its roof removed and back walls knocked down. Businesses and hotels were also damaged, and outbuildings as well as additional RVs and mobile homes were destroyed. Satellite data confirmed that the tornado moved through the Atchafalaya Basin before dissipating at LA 3177.						
EFU	SSE of Atchafalaya to NNE of Butte La Rose	St. Martin	LA	30.32°N 91.71°W	23:34–23:36	3.64 mi (5.86 km)	1 yd (0.91 m)
EFU	This tornado was discovered from high-resolution satellite imagery. Only damage occurred to trees but the area is inaccessible to survey.						
EFU	ESE of Atchafalaya to NE of Butte La Rose	St. Martin, Iberville	LA	30.34°N 91.7°W	23:35–23:38	5.09 mi (8.19 km)	100 yd (91 m)
EFU	A tornado was discovered via high-resolution satellite imagery in an inaccessible area within the Atchafalaya Basin.						
EF0	S of Gray Mountain	Coconino	AZ	35.63°N 111.49°W	22:39–22:40	0.1 mi (0.16 km)	10 yd (9.1 m)
EF0	A brief landspout tornado was photographed.						
EF0	NE of Butte La Rose to SW of Grosse Tête	Iberville	LA	30.36°N 91.61°W	23:39–23:47	6.56 mi (10.56 km)	150 yd (140 m)
EF0	Some trees were snapped or uprooted.						
EF0	Frisco	Pointe Coupee	LA	30.58°N 91.54°W	23:43–23:45	0.91 mi (1.46 km)	100 yd (91 m)
EF0	A high-end EF0 tornado touched down in Frisco, damaging trailers, homes, and numerous trees.						
EF0	SW of Plaquemine to Crescent	Iberville	LA	30.25°N 91.3°W	23:54–23:56	1.79 mi (2.88 km)	120 yd (110 m)
EF0	A few homes sustained roof damage, and numerous trees were snapped or uprooted.						
EF1	NE of Prairieville to SSE of Walker	Livingston	LA	30.38°N 90.9°W	00:23–00:27	3.28 mi (5.28 km)	150 yd (140 m)
EF1	Trees were damaged.						

=== May 14 event ===
List of confirmed tornadoes – Tuesday, May 14, 2024
EF#	Location	County / Parish	State	Start Coord.	Time (UTC)	Path length	Max width
EF0	NW of Bristow	Marlboro	SC	34.4198°N 79.6459°W	20:39–20:45	1.64 mi (2.64 km)	150 yd (140 m)
EF0	One home sustained significant shingle damage while another had a significant amount of its metal roof panels removed. A small water pump was destroyed, and a 50–60 ft (15–18 m) flagpole was snapped about 5 ft (1.5 m) above its base and thrown. A small boat on a private lake was flipped, and a few equipment shelters sustained minor damage to their metal roofs; a barn door was broken from its hinges as well. A wood fence was blown down, crops were flattened and even scoured, and trees were snapped or uprooted.						
EF0	NNE of Ethridge	Lawrence	TN	35.3553°N 87.2837°W	21:16–21:22	3.62 mi (5.83 km)	100 yd (91 m)
EF0	A few farm outbuildings were destroyed. Numerous trees were snapped or uprooted. A few homes sustained damage to their roofs or otherwise had flashing peeled off.						
EFU	SSW of Kanorado	Kit Carson	CO	39.21°N 102.089°W	21:40–21:42	0.33 mi (0.53 km)	15 yd (14 m)
EFU	A landspout tornado was photographed.						
EF0	SW of Red Banks	Robeson	NC	34.6871°N 79.2624°W	21:52–21:53	0.13 mi (0.21 km)	30 yd (27 m)
EF0	A brief and weak tornado snapped and uprooted trees, caused minor roof damage, and ripped a street sign out of its base.						
EF0	NNE of Pembroke to SW of Rennert	Robeson	NC	34.7298°N 79.1544°W	22:00–22:14	5.16 mi (8.30 km)	40 yd (37 m)
EF0	Several chicken coops saw significant portions of their steel roof panels ripped off. An open-ended tractor shelter was largely collapsed. A few homes sustained shingle damage. Numerous trees were snapped and uprooted.						
EF0	Philadelphus	Robeson	NC	34.7536°N 79.1632°W	22:06–22:07	0.23 mi (0.37 km)	150 yd (140 m)
EF0	A brief tornado snapped and uprooted multiple trees, one of which fell on a home and caused minor roof damage. Additional structures sustained shingle damage, an RV was nearly overturned, and a corn bin was blown over.						
EF1	Marion	Marion	SC	34.1715°N 79.409°W	22:10–22:13	2.02 mi (3.25 km)	80 yd (73 m)
EF1	The roof of a structure was completely collapsed and the structure itself sustained some damage to its exterior walls. An adjacent building had its windows and window dividers blown out while a wall on the second floor was pushed inward. Another nearby structure lost most of its roof covering. Additional homes along the tornado's path sustained roof damage. An electrical meter head was detached from one house and a trampoline was lofted at another before becoming embedded into the vinyl siding of a neighboring home. The majority of damage was inflicted to two-to-three story structures while trees sustained insignificant damage, suggesting the tornado did not remain in contact with the ground along its entire path.						
EF1	SSW of Paradise	Warrick	IN	37.9587°N 87.385°W	22:14–22:15	0.36 mi (0.58 km)	75 yd (69 m)
EF1	Trees were snapped and uprooted. A few homes sustained fascia and gutter damage.						
EF0	E of Evergreen	Columbus	NC	34.4097°N 78.8018°W	23:52–23:58	2.2 mi (3.5 km)	40 yd (37 m)
EF0	A few outbuildings sustained moderate damage, including one that lost some of its roof panels and had its garage door blown in. The side was blown off an open-faced metal garage and shingles were ripped from a home. Numerous trees were snapped and uprooted.						
EF0	S of Clarkton	Columbus, Bladen	NC	34.4397°N 78.7162°W	00:03–00:18	6.08 mi (9.78 km)	40 yd (37 m)
EF0	A weak tornado damaged several trees and blew the metal roof off a small structure.						

=== May 16 event ===
East Texas and Louisiana events are associated with the 2024 Houston derecho

List of confirmed tornadoes – Thursday, May 16, 2024
EF#	Location	County / Parish	State	Start Coord.	Time (UTC)	Path length	Max width
EFU	S of Mentone	Reeves	TX	31.57°N 103.59°W	20:30–20:32	unknown	unknown
EFU	A landspout was recorded.						
EF1	SW of Waller	Waller	TX	29.989°N 95.9947°W	22:44–22:45	0.71 mi (1.14 km)	100 yd (91 m)
EF1	A large metal barn was destroyed, with debris tossed 1,000 yd (910 m). Trailers were rolled, and trees were downed.						
EF1	Southern Cypress (1st tornado)	Harris	TX	29.9274°N 95.7444°W	23:04–23:05	0.58 mi (0.93 km)	75 yd (69 m)
EF1	A high-end EF1 severely damaged three houses.						
EF1	Southern Cypress (2nd tornado)	Harris	TX	29.9232°N 95.7019°W	23:08–23:10	1.44 mi (2.32 km)	100 yd (91 m)
EF1	Numerous homes sustained roof damage and broken windows. Damage was also noted at the Lone Star College-CyFair campus.						
EFU	NE of Whitewater	Phillips	MT	48.94°N 107.35°W	23:15–23:20	0.5 mi (0.80 km)	20 yd (18 m)
EFU	This landspout tornado was filmed before dissipating over open land.						
EF1	Romeville	St. James	LA	30.07°N 90.89°W	03:46–03:52	4.83 mi (7.77 km)	120 yd (110 m)
EF1	A tornado moved through Romeville, damaging the roofs of several frame houses and manufactured homes, snapping power poles, and snapping trees.						

=== May 17 event ===
List of confirmed tornadoes – Friday, May 17, 2024
EF#	Location	County / Parish	State	Start Coord.	Time (UTC)	Path length	Max width
EF0	NE of Leesville	Carroll	OH	40.4655°N 81.1845°W	17:33–17:35	0.21 mi (0.34 km)	40 yd (37 m)
EF0	The rapid formation of a narrow tornado was filmed on the shore of Leesville Lake. It tossed docks and pontoon boats and destroyed a tree.						
EFU	West Mifflin	Allegheny	PA	40.3588°N 79.9286°W	18:48–18:50	0.61 mi (0.98 km)	50 yd (46 m)
EFU	A tornado was filmed near the Allegheny County Airport. It did not cause damage.						
EF0	Elizabeth	Washington, Allegheny	PA	40.2514°N 79.9271°W	18:54–19:14	5.85 mi (9.41 km)	75 yd (69 m)
EF0	Multiple homes lost portions of their shingles, siding, and soffit. The porch of a manufactured home was ripped off and tossed, and a swimming pool was collapsed. Porch railing and furniture were destroyed and thrown. Trees were snapped or uprooted.						
EF0	NE of Manor	Westmoreland	PA	40.3578°N 79.6523°W	19:50–20:00	2.94 mi (4.73 km)	100 yd (91 m)
EF0	Flag poles were bent, and a few homes had shingles, siding, and soffit removed. The tornado moved across the Greensburg Jeannette Regional Airport, snapping a tree.						
EF1	Northeastern Pittsburgh	Allegheny	PA	40.476°N 79.9308°W	20:37–20:45	1.88 mi (3.03 km)	125 yd (114 m)
EF1	A tornado touched down near Highland Park and continued across the Pittsburgh Zoo & Aquarium before dissipating along the shoreline of Aspinwall. Numerous trees were snapped or uprooted, including one that fell on a vehicle. Power poles were damaged as well.						
EF0	SW of Elmwood	Tuscola	MI	43.57°N 83.29°W	20:38	0.1 mi (0.16 km)	10 yd (9.1 m)
EF0	Multiple photos were taken of a brief landspout.						

=== May 19 event ===
List of confirmed tornadoes – Sunday, May 19, 2024
EF#	Location	County / Parish	State	Start Coord.	Time (UTC)	Path length	Max width
EFU	S of Lindon	Washington	CO	39.57°N 103.43°W	19:12–19:22	0.21 mi (0.34 km)	25 yd (23 m)
EFU	This well-photographed tornado remained over open fields for the duration of its life.						
EF1	NW of Russell	Russell	KS	38.899°N 98.8971°W	20:32–20:42	1.62 mi (2.61 km)	15 yd (14 m)
EF1	Numerous power poles were broken and leaning.						
EF2	NNE of Iliff	Logan	CO	40.83°N 103.02°W	20:45–20:56	1.57 mi (2.53 km)	30 yd (27 m)
EF2	This strong tornado initially caused damage by uprooting and snapping several trees near a residence, with debris embedded in the home's exterior. It then damaged another residence, removing an awning, siding, and roofing shingles. The tornado reached peak intensity as it snapped three telephone poles at EF2 strength. It continued to overturn farm equipment and damage an outbuilding before lifting over open fields.						
EFU	NE of Iliff	Logan	CO	40.82°N 102.95°W	20:56	0.01 mi (0.016 km)	15 yd (14 m)
EFU	A tornado occurred just to the east of a school before quickly lifting.						
EF0	ENE of Wilson	Ellsworth	KS	38.848°N 98.3941°W	21:20–21:25	0.17 mi (0.27 km)	10 yd (9.1 m)
EF0	A pivot system was flipped and a KDOT sign was twisted.						
EFU	SSE of Fleming	Logan	CO	40.64°N 102.81°W	21:28–21:33	0.16 mi (0.26 km)	25 yd (23 m)
EFU	This brief tornado occurred over open fields.						
EF0	E of Roll	Roger Mills	OK	35.769°N 99.624°W	23:19	0.2 mi (0.32 km)	30 yd (27 m)
EF0	Two storm chasers observed a short-lived tornado that damaged a barn.						
EF0	NNE of Strong City	Roger Mills	OK	35.755°N 99.535°W	23:27	0.5 mi (0.80 km)	30 yd (27 m)
EF0	A compressor shed was damaged.						
EFU	NE of Adair	McDonough	IL	40.44°N 90.48°W	23:35–23:40	0.63 mi (1.01 km)	20 yd (18 m)
EFU	This brief landspout that caused no damage.						
EF0	ENE of Strong City to NW of Hammon	Roger Mills	OK	35.698°N 99.486°W	23:43–23:46	1.92 mi (3.09 km)	30 yd (27 m)
EF0	This tornado was observed by multiple storm chasers. A barn and nearby trees were damaged.						
EFU	NNW of Ellinwood	Barton	KS	38.39°N 98.61°W	23:47–23:49	1.05 mi (1.69 km)	40 yd (37 m)
EFU	A tornado was recorded. It did not cause damage.						
EFU	NE of Hammon	Custer	OK	35.661°N 99.332°W	23:58–00:00	0.51 mi (0.82 km)	100 yd (91 m)
EFU	A storm chaser observed a partially rain-wrapped tornado that caused no known damage.						
EF2	ENE of Butler to WNW of Custer City	Custer	OK	35.673°N 99.07°W	00:28–00:44	6.7 mi (10.8 km)	1,760 yd (1,610 m)
EF2	This tornado initially caused narrow damage before rapidly intensifying into a large multiple-vortex tornado, reaching a width of about one mile. It caused widespread tree and power pole damage, with the most significant structural impacts along its path, including destroyed outbuildings, roof damage to a home, and debris blown considerable distances. The tornado's intensity, suggested by preliminary radar data, indicates it may have been stronger locally than the EF2 rating determined by the damage survey. The tornado eventually narrowed as it approached US 183 before dissipating.						
EF1	NW of Custer City	Custer	OK	35.71°N 99.001°W	00:39–01:02	6.7 mi (10.8 km)	400 yd (370 m)
EF1	This tornado developed to the north of the previous tornado, causing significant damage along its path. It destroyed at least two outbuildings and heavily damaged several others, while also causing tree and power pole damage. The tornado dissipated north of Custer City after crossing a US 183.						
EF1	ESE of Custer City to N of Weatherford	Custer	OK	35.629°N 98.774°W	01:05–01:14	5 mi (8.0 km)	440 yd (400 m)
EF1	A tornado caused significant roof damage to a home and damaged shingles on at least two others as it moved eastward. A mobile home sustained roof and siding damage, several outbuildings were damaged or destroyed, and numerous trees and power poles were impacted.						
EFU	N of Weatherford	Custer	OK	35.576°N 98.697°W	01:13	0.4 mi (0.64 km)	30 yd (27 m)
EFU	Satellite imagery indicated a narrow damage swath in a farm field.						
EF1	NW of Burns	Marion	KS	38.1°N 96.92°W	01:16–01:18	1.09 mi (1.75 km)	40 yd (37 m)
EF1	Trees were damaged.						
EF0	SSE of Hydro	Caddo	OK	35.548°N 98.574°W	01:24–01:25	1 mi (1.6 km)	40 yd (37 m)
EF0	A semi-truck was blown over on I-40 and an ODOT facility was damaged. This tornado was likely anticyclonic.						
EF1	WSW of Geary	Blaine	OK	35.6032°N 98.4733°W	01:37–01:38	0.47 mi (0.76 km)	50 yd (46 m)
EF1	Trees were damaged.						
EF1	W of Bridgeport	Blaine, Caddo	OK	35.5521°N 98.4399°W	01:37–01:39	0.6 mi (0.97 km)	50 yd (46 m)
EF1	An anticyclonic tornado developed in Blaine County and quickly moved into Caddo County, where scattered tree damage occurred.						
EF2	NE of Union City to WSW of Yukon	Canadian	OK	35.448°N 97.853°W	02:32–02:48	3.5 mi (5.6 km)	300 yd (270 m)
EF2	This tornado caused significant roof damage to a few houses, blew in windows, and damaged several outbuildings as it moved northeast. The primary damage along its path, however, was to trees and power poles.						
EF0	NE of Union City	Canadian	OK	35.452°N 97.873°W	02:41–02:44	1.2 mi (1.9 km)	300 yd (270 m)
EF0	An off-duty SPC meteorologist observed a tornado that inflicted some shingle damage to a home.						
EF0	NNE of Union City to southern El Reno	Canadian	OK	38.1°N 96.92°W	02:41–02:53	3 mi (4.8 km)	30 yd (27 m)
EF0	A barn was damaged, and a hay bale was tossed. Some street signs were blown over as well.						
EF0	SW of Auburn	Osage	KS	38.8332°N 95.8409°W	02:44–02:48	0.69 mi (1.11 km)	40 yd (37 m)
EF0	This brief tornado damaged trees and tree limbs.						
EF0	SSW of Dover	Shawnee	KS	38.9549°N 95.9375°W	03:08–03:10	0.08 mi (0.13 km)	30 yd (27 m)
EF0	Radar indicated a small tornado debris signature from this brief tornado that damaged tree limbs.						
EF0	Southwestern Oklahoma City	Oklahoma	OK	35.408°N 97.574°W	03:10	0.1 mi (0.16 km)	10 yd (9.1 m)
EF0	A storm chaser from a local TV station observed a brief tornado at the I-44/I-240 interchange. No damage was found, but the tornado was given an EF0 rating due to its visually weak appearance.						
EF1	Southern Gardner	Johnson	KS	38.7837°N 94.9398°W	03:19–03:21	0.88 mi (1.42 km)	75 yd (69 m)
EF1	This short-lived tornado tipped a shipping container and damaged the roof of an apartment complex.						
EF1	NW of De Soto to ENE of Linwood	Leavenworth	KS	38.999°N 94.9953°W	03:26–03:28	1.51 mi (2.43 km)	150 yd (140 m)
EF1	Trees were damaged as the tornado remained over rural areas.						
EF1	Western Shawnee	Johnson	KS	39.0153°N 94.8435°W	03:31–03:36	1.63 mi (2.62 km)	105 yd (96 m)
EF1	A high-end EF1 tornado damaged the concession stand and administrative building near a high school. The tornado moved into neighborhoods, damaging roofs and snapping and uprooting trees.						
EF1	Prairie Village to Fairway	Johnson	KS	38.99°N 94.66°W	03:39–03:45	2.63 mi (4.23 km)	150 yd (140 m)
EF1	Trees were uprooted and snapped, and homes suffered roof damage.						
EF1	NW of Waynoka	Woods	OK	36.646°N 98.962°W	03:53–03:57	2.7 mi (4.3 km)	300 yd (270 m)
EF1	A number of trees were snapped, and two oil field sites were damaged.						
EF1	NNW of Waynoka	Woods	OK	36.653°N 98.938°W	04:01–04:07	1.5 mi (2.4 km)	40 yd (37 m)
EF1	Trees were snapped or uprooted, an oil tank was blown or rolled about 300 yards (270 m), and a barn was damaged.						

=== May 20 event ===
List of confirmed tornadoes – Monday, May 20, 2024
EF#	Location	County / Parish	State	Start Coord.	Time (UTC)	Path length	Max width
EF0	WNW of Hayfield	Dodge	MN	43.9268°N 92.9896°W	23:10–23:15	1.16 mi (1.87 km)	50 yd (46 m)
EF0	A landspout tornado briefly occurred over rural land.						
EF0	NW of Hayfield	Dodge	MN	43.9546°N 92.9562°W	23:25–23:28	1.39 mi (2.24 km)	35 yd (32 m)
EF0	This landspout tornado touched down in an open field and lifted rather quickly. The tornado's path was also noted on satellite imagery.						
EFU	SSW of Tennant	Shelby	IA	41.567°N 95.471°W	01:18–01:20	0.42 mi (0.68 km)	20 yd (18 m)
EFU	A landspout occurred over open farmland.						

=== May 21 event ===
List of confirmed tornadoes – Tuesday, May 21, 2024
EF#	Location	County / Parish	State	Start Coord.	Time (UTC)	Path length	Max width
EF0	SE of Duncan	Polk	NE	41.3031°N 97.4716°W	09:54–09:58	4.12 mi (6.63 km)	75 yd (69 m)
EF0	A brief tornado damaged trees, downed power lines and power poles, and overturned several pivots.						
EF0	NE of Richland	Colfax	NE	41.493°N 97.158°W	10:14–10:15	0.51 mi (0.82 km)	50 yd (46 m)
EF0	Many center pivots were overturned, three hog barns lost their roofs, and numerous trees were damaged.						
EF0	WSW of Brainard	Butler	NE	41.151°N 97.067°W	10:23–10:24	0.62 mi (1.00 km)	50 yd (46 m)
EF0	A weak tornado caused minor tree damage.						
EF0	N of Loma	Butler	NE	41.148°N 96.993°W	10:27–10:31	2.64 mi (4.25 km)	50 yd (46 m)
EF0	Trees sustained minor damage.						
EF0	SSW of Inglewood	Saunders	NE	41.396°N 96.511°W	10:45–10:46	0.39 mi (0.63 km)	50 yd (46 m)
EF0	A brief tornado damaged trees and a few homes.						
EF0	N of Coburg	Montgomery	IA	40.942°N 95.285°W	12:10–12:11	0.69 mi (1.11 km)	40 yd (37 m)
EF0	A weak tornado caused intermittent damage to trees and a fence.						
EF1	S of Bethesda	Page	IA	40.799°N 95.128°W	12:32–12:36	3.27 mi (5.26 km)	80 yd (73 m)
EF1	Trees and outbuildings were damaged, including a large barn that sustained significant damage.						
EF0	Northern Yutan	Saunders	NE	41.246°N 96.394°W	17:52–17:53	0.22 mi (0.35 km)	50 yd (46 m)
EF0	This brief tornado broke several branches off of multiple trees within Yutan.						
EF1	WNW of Truesdale	Buena Vista	IA	42.746°N 95.276°W	19:30–19:35	1.64 mi (2.64 km)	75 yd (69 m)
EF1	A high-end EF1 tornado struck three farmsteads. At the first farmstead, roof panels of an outbuilding were blown off and tree damage occurred. At the second farmstead, the roof of a home was torn off and a garage was shifted off its foundation. Tree damage also occurred here. At the third farmstead, a garage door was blown in and grain bins were damaged.						
EF1	Red Oak	Montgomery	IA	40.986°N 95.27°W	19:35–19:40	2.95 mi (4.75 km)	70 yd (64 m)
EF1	A building at a water facility had all of its doors and a wall knocked out. Trees were damaged.						
EF3	S of Nyman to W of Villisca to SSW of Bridgewater	Page, Montgomery, Adams	IA	40.856°N 95.201°W	19:43–20:21	33.86 mi (54.49 km)	1,300 yd (1,200 m)
EF3	See section on this tornado.						
EF4	SSE of Villisca to NW of Corning to Greenfield	Page, Taylor, Adams, Adair	IA	40.887°N 94.957°W	19:57–20:45	42.38 mi (68.20 km)	1,600 yd (1,500 m)
EF4	5 deaths – See article on this tornado – 35 people were injured.						
EF0	SSE of Brayton to ENE of Exira	Audubon	IA	41.5127°N 94.9085°W	20:09–20:18	7.24 mi (11.65 km)	100 yd (91 m)
EF0	This weak tornado damaged only trees.						
EF1	NW of Mercer to northwestern Cromwell	Adams, Union	IA	40.9539°N 94.6758°W	20:18–20:36	12.66 mi (20.37 km)	200 yd (180 m)
EF1	Outbuildings were damaged or destroyed, a grain bin had its top ripped off, a home had minor damage, and trees were uprooted or had limbs snapped off.						
EF2	Eastern Greenfield to S of Dexter	Adair	IA	41.3002°N 94.4473°W	20:39–20:56	14.87 mi (23.93 km)	200 yd (180 m)
EF2	This strong tornado formed on the east side of Greenfield as the main EF4 Greenfield tornado was entering the town and moves northeastward. It caused significant damage on farmsteads along its path, damaging outbuildings and tree groves. It also toppled a wind turbine, and completely destroyed an outbuilding and shredded trees at EF2 intensity. The tornado then quickly weakened and dissipated as it approached the Madison county line.						
EF0	Southern Fairmont	Martin	MN	43.6236°N 94.4659°W	20:48–20:51	2.28 mi (3.67 km)	75 yd (69 m)
EF0	A tornado touched down over Hall Lake, flipping two pontoon boats near the shoreline. As it moved northeast, it snapped or uprooted several dozen trees and knocked down a fence. Near the end of its path, it caused partial outward damage to the wall of a small metal shed before dissipating.						
EF0	S of Macksburg	Union, Madison	IA	41.1504°N 94.2242°W	20:50–20:54	3.97 mi (6.39 km)	70 yd (64 m)
EF0	A weak tornado impacted two farmsteads, damaging the roof of an outbuilding and producing tree damage.						
EF0	Martensdale	Warren	IA	41.3686°N 93.7454°W	21:25–21:26	1.04 mi (1.67 km)	40 yd (37 m)
EF0	This brief tornado tracked through Martensdale, damaging trees and shingles on the roofs of homes.						
EF0	W of Spring Hill	Warren	IA	41.3997°N 93.6787°W	21:28–21:32	2 mi (3.2 km)	75 yd (69 m)
EF0	Trees were downed.						
EF2	Johnston to southeastern Alleman to SE of Zearing	Polk, Story	IA	41.6765°N 93.7623°W	21:30–22:05	40.84 mi (65.73 km)	1,000 yd (910 m)
EF2	This strong, long-track tornado caused a range of damage as it moved through Polk and Story counties. It began with minor damage to homes and trees, including blown-out windows at Johnston High School and roof damage in residential areas. The tornado intensified as it moved northeast, producing EF2 damage, particularly near I-35, where several houses and outbuildings were destroyed or severely damaged. In Story County, the tornado grew wider and caused extensive EF2 damage, including the destruction of a house, snapping of large power poles, and obliteration of trees. The tornado eventually weakened and dissipated. Four injuries occurred.						
EF0	E of Calhoun	Henry	MO	38.4646°N 93.5936°W	22:26–22:28	0.35 mi (0.56 km)	50 yd (46 m)
EF0	A weak tornado lifted the roof off of a metal outbuilding, tossing the metal sides and roof.						
EF1	NW of Verdigris to WSW of Tiawah	Rogers	OK	36.255°N 95.7074°W	22:27–22:36	5.3 mi (8.5 km)	500 yd (460 m)
EF1	A number of house roofs were damaged. Numerous trees were snapped or uprooted on either side of I-44 as well.						
EF1	SW of Tiawah	Rogers	OK	36.2486°N 95.5862°W	22:39–22:41	1 mi (1.6 km)	100 yd (91 m)
EF1	A metal carport was destroyed. Trees were snapped or uprooted.						
EF0	W of Red Wing	Goodhue	MN	44.5599°N 92.6359°W	22:41–22:42	0.69 mi (1.11 km)	25 yd (23 m)
EF0	Approximately twelve to fifteen trees were broken in a grove.						
EF1	NE of St. Charles, MN to western Rollingstone, MN to NNW of Fountain City, WI	Winona (MN), Buffalo (WI)	MN, WI	43.98°N 92.01°W	23:01–23:19	19.74 mi (31.77 km)	110 yd (100 m)
EF1	A tornado caused sporadic damage to farmsteads and trees before crossing the Mississippi River into Wisconsin, where it dissipated.						
EF1	Eastern Cochrane	Buffalo	WI	44.2113°N 91.8398°W	23:14–23:17	3.9 mi (6.3 km)	100 yd (91 m)
EF1	A tornado began at the edge of the Mississippi River and caused minor tree damage. Moving northeast, the tornado destroyed a barn and caused more tree damage at a golf course. The tornado destroyed another barn before dissipating.						
EF1	S of Herold to NW of Glencoe	Buffalo	WI	44.272°N 91.8482°W	23:17–23:20	2.69 mi (4.33 km)	45 yd (41 m)
EF1	A garage and an outbuilding were destroyed. A power pole and some trees were damaged.						
EF1	E of Dewey Corners	Trempealeau	WI	44.2464°N 91.3965°W	23:34–23:35	0.84 mi (1.35 km)	150 yd (140 m)
EF1	A very brief tornado struck a residence, destroying a garage and impaling some 2x4s into the residence. The tornado caused some tree damage before dissipating.						
EF1	Northern Augusta	Eau Claire	WI	44.6809°N 91.1223°W	23:56–00:07	9.47 mi (15.24 km)	440 yd (400 m)
EF1	A fast-moving tornado downed thousands of trees which caused damage to numerous homes upon falling. Portions of roofing was ripped from a few large sheds.						
EF1	NNE of North Branch to SW of Humbird	Jackson	WI	44.4872°N 90.9807°W	23:59–00:02	3.13 mi (5.04 km)	75 yd (69 m)
EF1	An EF1 tornado caused intermittent tree damage.						
EF1	ENE of Humbird to SW of Globe	Clark	WI	44.567°N 90.8068°W	00:08–00:15	6.96 mi (11.20 km)	300 yd (270 m)
EF1	A tornado downed trees and powerlines. Multiple farmsteads were impacted, with the worst damage inflicted to outbuildings.						
EF1	NNE of Christie to SW of Riplinger	Clark	WI	44.6945°N 90.5783°W	00:20–00:29	9.07 mi (14.60 km)	120 yd (110 m)
EF1	This tornado damaged several farmsteads, powerlines and trees.						
EF1	SE of Longwood to Atwood	Clark	WI	44.8464°N 90.5417°W	00:27–00:31	4.04 mi (6.50 km)	150 yd (140 m)
EF1	Trees and several outbuildings were damaged.						
EF1	NNW of Spokeville to SW of Riplinger	Clark	WI	44.7797°N 90.4493°W	00:29–00:31	2.2 mi (3.5 km)	75 yd (69 m)
EF1	A brief tornado damaged a farmstead and trees.						
EF0	E of Riplinger to NNW of Curtiss	Clark	WI	44.8295°N 90.3828°W	00:33–00:34	1.39 mi (2.24 km)	75 yd (69 m)
EF0	This weak tornado damaged a farmstead and a grove of trees.						
EF1	Unity to S of Colby	Clark, Marathon	WI	44.8406°N 90.3247°W	00:34–00:37	4.01 mi (6.45 km)	110 yd (100 m)
EF1	A tornado damaged trees and power lines in Unity. On the west side of town, structural damage occurred to homes and garages. Scattered tree damage continued until the tornado lifted.						
EF1	WSW of Fenwood to S of Wien	Marathon	WI	44.8621°N 90.046°W	00:47–00:50	2.11 mi (3.40 km)	60 yd (55 m)
EF1	A low-end EF1 tornado tracked through forested areas.						
EF1	ESE of Mount Horeb to S of Pine Bluff	Dane	WI	42.9911°N 89.6976°W	00:49–00:54	4.63 mi (7.45 km)	75 yd (69 m)
EF1	This tornado impacted a farm where two sheds were lofted into nearby woods, causing significant tree damage. As it tracked northeast, it crossed a highway and shifted an outbuilding off its foundation. Further along its path, the tornado uprooted or snapped around twenty mature trees at a farmstead before dissipating.						
EF1	SE of Straford to W of Poniatowski	Marathon	WI	44.9548°N 90.0486°W	00:51–00:54	2.13 mi (3.43 km)	80 yd (73 m)
EF1	A tornado damaged trees and caused a barn to collapse. Minor structure damage occurred as well.						
EF1	SSE of Budsin to WSW of Neshkoro	Marquette	WI	43.8837°N 89.3113°W	00:59–01:07	5.27 mi (8.48 km)	60 yd (55 m)
EF1	Up to 40 trees were snapped or uprooted, some of which inflicted significant damage to a home's roof and a garage upon falling.						
EF1	Kaukauna	Outagamie	WI	44.2633°N 88.2947°W	01:58–02:02	2.69 mi (4.33 km)	80 yd (73 m)
EF1	A tornado originally started in southern before crossing the Fox River into the north part of town. It caused damage to trees, a couple of house garages, and the roof of an apartment building.						
EF1	SSE of Detroit Harbor	Door	WI	45.3494°N 86.9145°W	03:32–03:34	2.28 mi (3.67 km)	50 yd (46 m)
EF1	This tornado occurred entirely on Washington Island. Numerous trees were uprooted with some trunks snapped. One outbuilding had its walls collapsed as well.						

=== May 22 event ===
List of confirmed tornadoes – Wednesday, May 22, 2024
EF#	Location	County / Parish	State	Start Coord.	Time (UTC)	Path length	Max width
EF1	Quinton	Pittsburg, Haskell	OK	35.1235°N 95.3841°W	14:37–14:44	2.9 mi (4.7 km)	300 yd (270 m)
EF1	The roofs of homes were damaged. Trees were snapped or uprooted.						
EF3	SSW of Sterling City	Sterling, Tom Green	TX	31.5844°N 101.1025°W	20:29–20:50	4.79 mi (7.71 km)	400 yd (370 m)
EF3	A tornado touched down on a ranch house, damaging its roof and flipping an RV trailer. Two utility poles were destroyed and several others were damaged. An oil pump jack was overturned, trees were severely damaged with only stubs remaining on some, and caliche roads were stripped of their rocks, grass, and top soil.						
EF2	SSE of Morgan's Point Resort to WNW of Temple	Bell	TX	31.1334°N 97.4388°W	23:21–23:26	2.78 mi (4.47 km)	420 yd (380 m)
EF2	Many homes sustained roof and window damage, including four that lost most of their roof and some outside walls. Additional businesses were damaged, including some that lost most of their roof. Several cars were flipped or otherwise damaged. Power poles and trees were damaged or snapped. In total, 30 people were injured. Rear flank downdraft winds upwards of 90 mph (140 km/h) continued through Temple.						
EF1	NE of Heidenheimer	Bell	TX	31.0455°N 97.3026°W	23:33–23:35	2.2 mi (3.5 km)	100 yd (91 m)
EF1	This tornado was the second one produced by the Temple supercell. It caused roof damage to structures, some significant. More than a dozen transmission towers were flipped on their side. Many trees were heavily damaged.						
EF1	SSW of Haughton	Bossier	LA	32.4006°N 93.553°W	00:30–00:31	0.22 mi (0.35 km)	100 yd (91 m)
EF1	A brief tornado ripped a carport from a house, collapsed the door of a metal building system, and blew the roof off an outbuilding. Many trees were snapped or uprooted.						

=== May 23 event ===
List of confirmed tornadoes – Thursday, May 23, 2024
EF#	Location	County / Parish	State	Start Coord.	Time (UTC)	Path length	Max width
EF1	S of Brule	Keith	NE	41.064°N 101.903°W	21:36–21:38	2.05 mi (3.30 km)	200 yd (180 m)
EF1	A high-end EF1 tornado snapped trees, damaged outbuildings on multiple farms, and heavily damaged multiple irrigation pivots.						
EFU	Temple	Bell	TX	31.0911°N 97.4071°W	21:39	0.01 mi (0.016 km)	20 yd (18 m)
EFU	An off-duty NWS meteorologist spotted a brief tornado to the west of I-35.						
EFU	SW of Bingham	Garden	NE	41.97°N 102.13°W	22:15	0.01 mi (0.016 km)	50 yd (46 m)
EFU	Multiple photos were taken of this brief tornado over open rangeland; no damage was found.						
EF1	E of Bruceville-Eddy	Falls, McLennan	TX	31.272°N 97.2285°W	22:27–22:35	2.92 mi (4.70 km)	150 yd (140 m)
EF1	A tornado caused scattered tree damage before impacting several homes and outbuildings, inflicting minor structural damage. As the tornado traveled farther northward, it entered McLennan County, and impacted a single wide mobile home. This mobile home was rolled multiple times, destroying the structure and resulting in minor damage to an adjacent frame built home. The two occupants of the mobile were injured. The tornado lifted shortly after.						
EF0	S of Marlin to SSE of Stranger	Falls	TX	31.23°N 97.91°W	22:47–23:10	12.69 mi (20.42 km)	400 yd (370 m)
EF0	A high-end EF0 tornado damaged a few outbuildings and numerous trees were blown down. This tornado's path was significantly adjusted in February 2025 using high resolution satellite imagery, storm chaser video, and radar data. Prior to the adjustment, the track indicated that the tornado had struck Marlin; the damage in the town was attributed to wind damage rather than a tornado.						
EFU	SE of Mooreville	Falls	TX	31.28°N 97.12°W	22:51–22:52	0.21 mi (0.34 km)	50 yd (46 m)
EFU	An off-duty employee of the NWS filmed a tornado. No damage was reported. This tornado was discovered from an event reanalysis in February 2025.						
EFU	W of Lemoyne	Keith	NE	41.29°N 101.93°W	23:12	0.05 mi (0.080 km)	25 yd (23 m)
EFU	A waterspout was photographed occurring over Lake McConaughy.						
EF0	SW of Gould	Harmon	OK	34.61°N 99.838°W	23:17–23:20	0.85 mi (1.37 km)	20 yd (18 m)
EF0	A few storm chasers observed a weak tornado that was more than likely a landspout.						
EFU	ENE of Bucyrus	Adams	ND	46.08°N 102.68°W	23:28–23:29	0.2 mi (0.32 km)	50 yd (46 m)
EFU	This tornado touched down in an open field and impacted no structures.						
EF1	SW of Brule	Keith	NE	41.052°N 101.989°W	23:29–23:34	5.15 mi (8.29 km)	430 yd (390 m)
EF1	This tornado touched down in southwestern Keith County, where it snapped trees, damaged power poles, and destroyed a grain bin. It overturned multiple center pivot irrigation systems as it traveled east, damaged outbuildings, and stripped shingles and siding off a house. The tornado continued northeast, flipping additional center pivots and causing further damage to farmsteads before dissipating.						
EF1	SE of Lemoyne (1st tornado)	Keith	NE	41.26°N 101.78°W	23:36–23:37	0.07 mi (0.11 km)	25 yd (23 m)
EF1	A very brief tornado tore the roof off a building and uprooted and snapped large trees. One tree fell onto a vehicle.						
EF1	SE of Lemoyne (2nd tornado)	Keith	NE	41.26°N 101.78°W	23:37–23:39	0.29 mi (0.47 km)	50 yd (46 m)
EF1	This tornado flattened a line of fences. A converging pattern was also noted in nearby prairieland.						
EF2	SE of Lemoyne (3rd tornado)	Keith	NE	41.26°N 101.78°W	23:39–23:42	0.3 mi (0.48 km)	200 yd (180 m)
EF2	A brief but strong tornado damaged multiple homes and a large pole barn was destroyed. Multiple trees were also downed.						
EF0	SE of Lemoyne (4th tornado)	Keith	NE	41.259°N 101.774°W	23:44–23:45	0.12 mi (0.19 km)	25 yd (23 m)
EF0	This weak tornado flipped two campers and uprooted multiple trees and snapped large tree limbs.						
EF1	S of Kosse	Falls, Limestone	TX	31.25°N 96.65°W	23:53–00:23	8.4 mi (13.5 km)	300 yd (270 m)
EF1	This tornado initially moved southeast across SH-14 blowing down trees that blocked the highway, before moving into rural forests and continuing to blow down trees. Taking an unusual backwards-S shaped curve, the tornado then damaged several outbuildings around a home and blew down numerous trees. The tornado strengthened as it curved to the northeast, blowing a home off its foundation and destroying several outbuildings. Curving further to the north-northwest, the tornado blew down hundreds of trees before finally lifting. This tornado was significantly adjusted in February 2025 based on high resolution satellite imagery, storm chaser video, and radar data.						
EF2	SSE of McQueen to ESE of Duke	Jackson	OK	34.579°N 99.657°W	00:04–00:57	15.1 mi (24.3 km)	2,000 yd (1,800 m)
EF2	A large, multi-vortex tornado destroyed several barns, inflicted roof damage to several homes, and snapped power poles. Extensive ground scouring was noted throughout the tornado's path. This tornado was likely much stronger than EF2, but did not directly hit any structures to confirm a higher rating.						
EF1	NNW of Berryville to Coffee City to Dogwood City	Henderson, Smith	TX	32.1°N 95.51°W	00:03–00:10	5.13 mi (8.26 km)	500 yd (460 m)
EF1	This tornado initially blew down dozens of trees on the south side of Lake Palestine before striking a marina where the tornado rolled several RVs, collapsed multiple metal canopies and uprooted and snapped numerous trees. The tornado then moved over an inlet on the lake as a waterspout where it shifted north-northeast, moving onshore into a small neighborhood in Coffee City. Several more trees were snapped and uprooted, with at least one large hardwood tree having fallen onto a two story home. The tornado then tracked into Briarwood Bay subdivision, where numerous trees were snapped and uprooted. The tornado then moved back over water again as a waterspout, curving eastward and crossing into Smith County before coming ashore in Dogwood City. Several trees were uprooted, multiple large branches were snapped and a power pole was partially broken in the city. The tornado moved back onto Lake Palestine in an inlet, where it then lifted. Four people were injured. The path of this tornado was adjusted and lengthened slightly in February 2025 using high resolution satellite imagery.						
EFU	S of Roscoe to NNE of Madrid	Keith, Perkins	NE	41.034°N 101.576°W	00:17–00:30	6.41 mi (10.32 km)	25 yd (23 m)
EFU	Multiple people observed a tornado that did not cause damage.						
EF0	WNW of Bald Prairie to SE of Oletha	Robertson	TX	31.23°N 96.5°W	00:18–01:01	11.12 mi (17.90 km)	200 yd (180 m)
EF0	This slow-moving, high-end EF0 tornado touched down on the north side of the Twin Oak Reservoir and tracked eastward, blowing down trees in a scattered fashion across rural areas north of the reservoir. Curving southeastward, the tornado moved through Bald Prairie destroying a barn and other outbuildings. The tornado weakened as it continued eastward out of town but still downed trees and damaged a barn. Curving to the northeast then north-northeast, scattered trees and large tree limbs continued to be blown down as the tornado then lifted. The path of this tornado was significantly adjusted in February 2025 using high resolution satellite imagery, NWS video, and radar data.						
EF0	S of Duke	Jackson	OK	34.581°N 99.551°W	00:25–00:27	0.9 mi (1.4 km)	40 yd (37 m)
EF0	A satellite to the 0004 UTC McQueen EF2 damaged a home.						
EF0	N of Marquez	Leon	TX	31.28°N 96.27°W	01:15	0.17 mi (0.27 km)	50 yd (46 m)
EF0	A few trees were blown down. This tornado was discovered from an event reanalysis in February 2025.						
EFU	SSE of Grainton	Hayes	NE	40.66°N 101.265°W	01:25	0.01 mi (0.016 km)	25 yd (23 m)
EFU	A tornado was photographed over an open field.						
EF1	W of Trenton	Hitchcock	NE	40.1752°N 101.0271°W	02:02–02:08	0.33 mi (0.53 km)	80 yd (73 m)
EF1	This high-end EF1 tornado moved through community baseball and football fields, causing significant damage. It snapped and uprooted multiple hardwood trees, bent large oil field pipes used as field signs, and snapped a wooden pole at the baseball field. Part of the football field's canopy roof was peeled back, and tin roofing was blown up to half a mile away. Despite this damage, nearby field goal posts and some trees remained undamaged.						
EF0	SSW of Perry	Red Willow	NE	40.2117°N 100.7282°W	02:30–02:32	0.41 mi (0.66 km)	28 yd (26 m)
EF0	Two trees were damaged.						
EF1	Holdrege	Phelps	NE	40.4335°N 99.3832°W	04:30–04:33	1.7 mi (2.7 km)	100 yd (91 m)
EF1	A few garages sustained damage and large trees were snapped or uprooted.						
EF0	N of Axtell	Kearney	NE	40.5675°N 99.1742°W	04:51–04:56	4.33 mi (6.97 km)	75 yd (69 m)
EF0	A pivot was damaged.						

=== May 24 event ===
List of confirmed tornadoes – Friday, May 24, 2024
EF#	Location	County / Parish	State	Start Coord.	Time (UTC)	Path length	Max width
EF0	NNW of Minden to W of Heartwell	Kearney	NE	40.5457°N 98.9707°W	05:00–05:30	8.37 mi (13.47 km)	60 yd (55 m)
EF0	A handful of pivots and trees were damaged.						
EF1	N of Palmer	Howard, Merrick, Nance	NE	41.2455°N 98.3131°W	05:09–05:18	6.99 mi (11.25 km)	95 yd (87 m)
EF1	A tornado caused intermittent damage to trees and an outbuilding.						
EF1	NW of Blue Hill	Adams	NE	40.367°N 98.5084°W	05:26–05:30	2.55 mi (4.10 km)	80 yd (73 m)
EF1	The door of a large outbuilding buckled and its east wall was blown out. Two pivots were damaged and several others were flipped. Trees and a barn were damaged. Three horses were killed.						
EF1	E of Tarnov to S of Leigh	Platte, Colfax	NE	41.615°N 97.444°W	06:08–06:23	11.79 mi (18.97 km)	700 yd (640 m)
EF1	Center pivots and grain storage bins were overturned. Outbuildings, trees, and the roof of a large livestock barn were damaged.						
EF1	Northeastern Columbus	Platte	NE	41.452°N 97.344°W	06:13–06:14	1.25 mi (2.01 km)	50 yd (46 m)
EF1	This tornado began at the Columbus Municipal Airport before moving over open fields northeast of town. Several wooden power poles were snapped.						
EF1	S of Howells	Colfax	NE	41.665°N 97.052°W	06:30–06:37	4.85 mi (7.81 km)	700 yd (640 m)
EF1	A grain bin was damaged, a center pivot was flipped, and several wooden power poles were snapped.						
EF0	NW of Ruby	Seward	NE	40.854°N 97.118°W	06:43–06:44	0.04 mi (0.064 km)	20 yd (18 m)
EF0	A very brief tornado damaged a center pivot.						
EF0	Snyder	Dodge	NE	41.705°N 96.78°W	06:50–06:51	1.07 mi (1.72 km)	75 yd (69 m)
EF0	A brief tornado damaged an outbuilding, flipped center pivots, and snapped or uprooted trees.						
EF0	SSE of Inglewood	Saunders	NE	41.386°N 96.488°W	07:03–07:04	0.08 mi (0.13 km)	20 yd (18 m)
EF0	A brief tornado caused tree damage.						
EF0	SE of Memphis	Saunders	NE	41.079°N 96.407°W	07:12–07:13	0.09 mi (0.14 km)	60 yd (55 m)
EF0	A spin-up tornado damaged trees and powerlines.						
EF0	S of Orum	Washington	NE	41.537°N 96.317°W	07:18–07:22	3.37 mi (5.42 km)	60 yd (55 m)
EF0	A tornado damaged power poles and several trees.						
EF0	Blair	Washington	NE	41.518°N 96.146°W	07:18–07:24	1.77 mi (2.85 km)	60 yd (55 m)
EF0	A brief tornado caused tree damage in Blair.						
EF0	SE of Gretna	Sarpy	NE	41.118°N 96.206°W	07:25–07:26	0.15 mi (0.24 km)	50 yd (46 m)
EF0	A very brief spin-up tornado damaged several power poles.						
EF0	S of Papillion	Sarpy	NE	41.123°N 96.043°W	07:31–07:32	0.48 mi (0.77 km)	60 yd (55 m)
EF0	A weak tornado minorly damaged homes and trees. Fences were also damaged.						
EF0	Bellevue	Sarpy	NE	41.113°N 95.958°W	07:35–07:40	3.72 mi (5.99 km)	300 yd (270 m)
EF0	This tornado moved over Offutt Air Force Base, damaging several trees, overturning a trailer and causing minor roof damage to a building.						
EF1	Missouri Valley	Harrison	IA	41.56°N 95.894°W	07:41–07:42	0.65 mi (1.05 km)	150 yd (140 m)
EF1	An EF1 tornado caused significant tree damage throughout town.						
EF0	S of Treynor	Pottawattamie	IA	41.175°N 95.615°W	08:00–08:01	0.25 mi (0.40 km)	60 yd (55 m)
EF0	A brief tornado destroyed three grain bins and damaged numerous trees.						
EF1	NW of Lockesburg	Sevier	AR	33.9872°N 94.2768°W	08:08–08:18	8.24 mi (13.26 km)	300 yd (270 m)
EF1	Power lines and trees were snapped or uprooted. A few homes were damaged by fallen trees. A chicken house had some of its roof panels ripped off.						
EF0	E of Henderson	Montgomery	IA	41.132°N 95.365°W	08:10–08:12	2.09 mi (3.36 km)	60 yd (55 m)
EF0	A farmstead had outbuildings and trees damaged.						
EF0	N of Westphalia	Shelby	IA	41.752°N 95.386°W	08:13–08:14	0.09 mi (0.14 km)	40 yd (37 m)
EF0	A brief spin-up tornado damaged roofs on outbuildings and downed several trees.						
EF0	ESE of Elliott	Montgomery	IA	41.131°N 95.1°W	08:22–08:23	1.16 mi (1.87 km)	30 yd (27 m)
EF0	One outbuilding was destroyed while a second lost its roof. A camper was rolled.						
EF0	NW of Waukee to northern Grimes	Dallas, Polk	IA	41.6419°N 93.9477°W	09:38–09:50	9.17 mi (14.76 km)	80 yd (73 m)
EF0	This tornado damaged trees and some outbuildings in Dallas County before causing damage to roof shingles and more trees in Polk County.						
EF0	NNW of Woodward to W of Kelley	Boone	IA	41.8948°N 93.9315°W	09:42–09:54	10.7 mi (17.2 km)	180 yd (160 m)
EF0	A weak tornado caused intermittent damage to trees and outbuildings.						
EF0	Johnston	Polk	IA	41.6607°N 93.7063°W	09:53–09:57	3.2 mi (5.1 km)	100 yd (91 m)
EF0	This tornado moved through Johnston inflicting minor damage on houses. Most of the damage in Johnston occurred to trees.						
EF0	NE of Indianola to NNW of Ackworth	Warren	IA	41.395°N 93.533°W	09:57–09:59	2.17 mi (3.49 km)	50 yd (46 m)
EF0	Minor tree damage was reported.						
EF0	NE of Enterprise to ESE of Elkhart	Polk	IA	41.7492°N 93.5045°W	10:07–10:09	1.52 mi (2.45 km)	50 yd (46 m)
EF0	A brief tornado damaged outbuildings and vehicles.						
EF1	N of Ellsworth to S of Williams	Hamilton	IA	42.3654°N 93.5889°W	10:10–10:13	2.87 mi (4.62 km)	75 yd (69 m)
EF1	This tornado tossed two semi-trucks off of I-35. A hog confinement building was also partially destroyed.						
EF1	W of Delta to SW of Keswick	Keokuk	IA	41.33°N 92.38°W	10:56–11:02	7.17 mi (11.54 km)	70 yd (64 m)
EF1	A brief EF1 tornado caused significant damage to trees and outbuildings.						
EF1	ESE Kinross to N of Sharon Center	Washington, Johnson	IA	41.43°N 91.94°W	11:26–11:48	18.32 mi (29.48 km)	100 yd (91 m)
EF1	A high-end EF1 tornado damaged homes, outbuildings, and trees.						
EF1	SSE of Riverside to southern West Branch	Washington, Johnson, Cedar	IA	41.45°N 91.59°W	11:50–12:14	22.52 mi (36.24 km)	150 yd (140 m)
EF1	An EF1 tornado caused intermittent damage to trees and outbuildings.						
EF1	S of Lone Tree to E of West Liberty	Johnson, Muscatine	IA	41.43°N 91.43°W	11:55–12:11	15.04 mi (24.20 km)	75 yd (69 m)
EF1	A fast-moving tornado damaged outbuildings at a farm and then continued through open farm land.						
EF0	Southern Solon	Johnson	IA	41.795°N 91.491°W	12:12–12:13	0.12 mi (0.19 km)	50 yd (46 m)
EF0	Trees and power poles were damaged by this high-end EF0 tornado.						
EFU	N of Sutliff to SW of Stanwood	Linn, Cedar	IA	41.8616°N 91.3822°W	12:20–12:32	10.99 mi (17.69 km)	10 yd (9.1 m)
EFU	A tornado was recorded but it did not cause damage.						
EF1	SW of Bennett to N of Lowden	Cedar	IA	41.7°N 91.05°W	12:30–12:44	14.98 mi (24.11 km)	50 yd (46 m)
EF1	A fast-moving, high-end EF1 tornado caused sporadic damage to trees, outbuildings, and power poles. A grain bin was blown off its foundation as well.						
EFU	ENE of Durant	Scott	IA	41.608°N 90.882°W	12:36–12:37	0.12 mi (0.19 km)	10 yd (9.1 m)
EFU	A tornado was recorded over an open field.						
EF1	S of Dixon to SE of Welton	Scott, Clinton	IA	41.71°N 90.77°W	12:45–13:09	15.33 mi (24.67 km)	50 yd (46 m)
EF1	An intermittent tornado caused minor damage to trees, power poles, and an outbuilding.						
EF1	NE of Taylor Ridge to Coal Valley to E of Colona	Rock Island, Henry	IL	41.39°N 90.65°W	12:52–13:16	20.04 mi (32.25 km)	50 yd (46 m)
EF1	A high-end, fast-moving EF1 tornado damaged a large outbuilding and trees.						
EF1	E of Maysville to N of Long Grove	Scott	IA	41.65°N 90.69°W	12:52–12:57	7.19 mi (11.57 km)	50 yd (46 m)
EF1	This tornado unroofed a large outbuilding on a farm.						
EFU	SW of Le Claire	Scott	IA	41.5756°N 90.3944°W	13:09–13:10	0.85 mi (1.37 km)	10 yd (9.1 m)
EFU	A tornado was recorded over the Mississippi River. No damage was reported.						
EFU	SE of Elvira	Clinton	IA	41.8572°N 90.3578°W	13:21–13:22	0.3 mi (0.48 km)	10 yd (9.1 m)
EFU	A tornado was recorded over an open field near Elvira. No damage was reported.						
EFU	NNW of Hooppole	Henry	IL	41.5461°N 89.9302°W	13:50–13:51	0.32 mi (0.51 km)	10 yd (9.1 m)
EFU	A tornado was recorded crossing IL 78. No damage reported.						
EFU	NNE of Deer Grove	Whiteside	IL	41.6334°N 89.693°W	14:12–14:13	1 mi (1.6 km)	10 yd (9.1 m)
EFU	A member of the public photographed a tornado. It did not cause damage.						
EFU	W of Ohio	Bureau	IL	41.5499°N 89.4794°W	14:31–14:32	0.53 mi (0.85 km)	10 yd (9.1 m)
EFU	A brief tornado was recorded.						
EFU	SSE of Kindred	Richland	ND	46.5918°N 96.999°W	19:52–19:53	0.51 mi (0.82 km)	10 yd (9.1 m)
EFU	A brief tornado lasted about thirty seconds in an open field.						
EF1	E of Verona to Camp Lejeune	Onslow	NC	34.673°N 77.454°W	21:24–21:37	8.84 mi (14.23 km)	150 yd (140 m)
EF1	Numerous trees were snapped or uprooted and power lines were damaged.						
EF1	NW of New Boston	Bowie	TX	33.5266°N 94.4741°W	00:05–00:09	1.83 mi (2.95 km)	275 yd (251 m)
EF1	Trees and large tree limbs were snapped. A tornado emergency was issued for New Boston and Hooks after the tornado dissipated.						

=== May 25 event ===
List of confirmed tornadoes – Saturday, May 25, 2024
EF#	Location	County / Parish	State	Start Coord.	Time (UTC)	Path length	Max width
EF0	S of Hookstown	Beaver	PA	40.5503°N 80.4682°W	20:59–21:00	0.1 mi (0.16 km)	30 yd (27 m)
EF0	A utility pole was damaged and multiple trees were snapped or uprooted.						
EF1	Northeastern Windthorst	Archer, Clay	TX	33.578°N 98.431°W	22:16–22:24	3.33 mi (5.36 km)	200 yd (180 m)
EF1	A tornado was observed by numerous storm spotters and storm chasers. The tornado damaged trees in northeastern Windthorst before moving into Clay County. In Clay County, a house received some shingle damage and a barn suffered significant roof damage. The tornado dissipated shortly after.						
EF1	WSW of Bluegrove	Clay	TX	33.632°N 98.341°W	22:33–22:41	3.4 mi (5.5 km)	100 yd (91 m)
EF1	Some trees were snapped.						
EF2	NE of Cross Plains	Eastland	TX	32.1515°N 99.1051°W	22:42–22:48	2.46 mi (3.96 km)	70 yd (64 m)
EF2	A small, well-built structure was pushed about 30 ft (9.1 m) and sustained roof damage. A metal barn and a chicken coop were destroyed. One RV trailer was demolished while a second was overturned, breaking its door and windows. Several trees and at least two wooden utility poles were snapped or uprooted. The tornado may have tracked a little further northeastward past its official end point, but the area was on private property and could not be surveyed.						
EF1	SE of Mutual	Woodward	OK	36.213°N 99.188°W	23:14–23:20	2.6 mi (4.2 km)	50 yd (46 m)
EF1	At least two barns were destroyed, a trailer and farm equipment were overturned, a home received minor damage and a mobile home received roof damage. Power poles were also damaged along the tornado's path.						
EFU	NNW of Chester	Major	OK	36.288°N 98.955°W	23:29–23:40	3.4 mi (5.5 km)	200 yd (180 m)
EFU	This tornado was observed over inaccessible rural areas by storm chasers and research meteorologists from the National Severe Storms Laboratory.						
EF0	Hazelton	Barber	KS	37.09°N 98.4°W	00:15–00:18	1.4 mi (2.3 km)	30 yd (27 m)
EF0	A high-end EF0 tornado damaged the roofs of two metal sheds, destroyed an outbuilding, turned over an empty trailer, snapped small trees, and uprooted another tree.						
EF2	NNE of Waldron to SSE of Attica	Harper	KS	37.0806°N 98.1424°W	00:29–00:36	6.7 mi (10.8 km)	100 yd (91 m)
EF2	This strong tornado struck a farm, heavily damaging a home, destroying an outbuilding, and snapping or uprooting trees.						
EFU	NNE of Burneyville	Love	OK	33.983°N 97.263°W	00:54	0.3 mi (0.48 km)	30 yd (27 m)
EFU	Storm chasers observed a brief tornado.						
EFU	WSW of Overbrook	Love	OK	34.038°N 97.209°W	01:06–01:07	0.5 mi (0.80 km)	50 yd (46 m)
EFU	A tornado was observed. No damage occurred.						
EF3	ESE of Bowie to S of Valley View to Pilot Point	Montague, Cooke, Denton	TX	33.526°N 97.745°W	02:39–04:15	48.25 mi (77.65 km)	3,000 yd (2,700 m)
EF3	7 deaths – See article on this tornado – 80-100 people were injured.						
EF1	ENE of Sanger	Denton	TX	33.376°N 97.1193°W	03:46–03:47	1.42 mi (2.29 km)	800 yd (730 m)
EF1	This was a satellite tornado to the larger Valley View tornado. A few homes sustained damage, including one house that lost most of its roof. At a marina, 24 RVs and motor homes in addition to floating docks and boats were damaged. Trees were damaged.						
EF3	NW of Valley Park to Claremore to NW of Pryor	Rogers, Mayes	OK	36.3072°N 95.7651°W	04:19–04:59	23.9 mi (38.5 km)	2,000 yd (1,800 m)
EF3	2 deaths – See section on this tornado – 23 people were injured.						
EF1	SW of Marilee to NE of Celina to S of Weston	Collin	TX	33.383°N 96.8029°W	04:20–04:31	8.31 mi (13.37 km)	800 yd (730 m)
EF1	This high-end EF1 tornado touched down after the Valley View tornado dissipated. It caused damage to metal buildings, telephone poles, and trees.						
EF3	NE of Celina	Collin	TX	33.3542°N 96.7565°W	04:23–04:24	0.71 mi (1.14 km)	175 yd (160 m)
EF3	A short-lived but intense satellite tornado to the larger EF1 tornado above struck a neighborhood just northeast of Celina. At least two residences along this street sustained moderate to high-end EF3 damage with estimated maximum winds of 165 mph (266 km/h), with roofs and walls destroyed. Several additional homes sustained EF2 or EF1 damage along this street.						

=== May 26 event ===
List of confirmed tornadoes – Sunday, May 26, 2024
EF#	Location	County / Parish	State	Start Coord.	Time (UTC)	Path length	Max width
EF1	Salina (1st tornado)	Mayes	OK	36.3196°N 95.1669°W	05:07–05:19	6.1 mi (9.8 km)	2,000 yd (1,800 m)
EF1	Outbuildings were destroyed, homes were damaged, and both power poles and trees were snapped or uprooted.						
EF1	WSW of Celeste	Hunt	TX	33.2764°N 96.279°W	05:15–05:17	1.09 mi (1.75 km)	50 yd (46 m)
EF1	This was the fifth and final tornado produced by the Valley View supercell. Multiple barns and outbuildings were destroyed, several homes sustained roof damage, and one home lost the roof to its front porch as well. Trees were also damaged.						
EF1	Salina (2nd tornado)	Mayes	OK	36.2998°N 95.1594°W	05:25–05:30	2.4 mi (3.9 km)	300 yd (270 m)
EF1	Homes and businesses were damaged, power poles were downed, and trees were snapped or uprooted.						
EF1	ESE of Kenwood to SSW of Eucha	Delaware	OK	36.3037°N 94.9146°W	05:36–05:39	1.8 mi (2.9 km)	650 yd (590 m)
EF1	Trees were uprooted.						
EF3	ENE of Colcord, OK to NW of Decatur, AR	Delaware (OK), Benton (AR)	OK, AR	36.3013°N 94.6176°W	05:59–06:21	7.9 mi (12.7 km)	3,200 yd (2,900 m)
EF3	An intense and very large tornado, the largest ever recorded in Arkansas, initially touched down in Oklahoma and tracked northeastward, damaging several homes, destroying outbuildings, snapping and uprooting trees, and snapping power poles. The tornado then moved into Arkansas and steadily widened and intensified, destroying homes and outbuildings, and causing extensive tree damage. The most intense damage occurred near and north of AR 102, where the tornado reached its peak intensity and width and remained near-stationary for several minutes. Several homes were destroyed and trees were stubbed and debarked at this location before the tornado dissipated shortly afterwards. In all, 60 homes and businesses or damaged or destroyed by this tornado.						
EF2	S of Decatur	Benton	AR	36.3231°N 94.5151°W	06:06–06:20	5.4 mi (8.7 km)	650 yd (590 m)
EF2	A strong anticyclonic tornado existed simultaneously with the EF3 tornado near Decatur. It destroyed storage buildings and outbuildings, damaged homes, and snapped both power poles and trees.						
EF1	Centerton	Benton	AR	36.3449°N 94.3265°W	06:23–06:28	2.3 mi (3.7 km)	600 yd (550 m)
EF1	The roofs of homes and businesses were damaged. Trees were snapped or uprooted.						
EF2	W of Centerton	Benton	AR	36.3283°N 94.3568°W	06:24–06:28	2.4 mi (3.9 km)	1,500 yd (1,400 m)
EF2	Several homes were damaged, one severely. Outbuildings were destroyed, and numerous trees were snapped or uprooted.						
EF2	Rogers	Benton	AR	36.3344°N 94.2002°W	06:46–07:00	7.4 mi (11.9 km)	3,000 yd (2,700 m)
EF2	A strong and very large tornado damaged hundreds of homes and businesses. Thousands of trees and many power poles were snapped or uprooted.						
EF1	S of War Eagle	Benton	AR	36.2548°N 93.9444°W	07:10–07:16	3.2 mi (5.1 km)	300 yd (270 m)
EF1	A manufactured home was damaged, power lines were downed, and numerous trees were snapped or uprooted, some of which fell onto houses.						
EF1	N of Hindsville	Benton, Madison	AR	36.2407°N 93.9029°W	07:16–07:29	8.9 mi (14.3 km)	500 yd (460 m)
EF1	Trees were snapped or uprooted, and power lines were downed.						
EF3	S of Bellefonte to N of Summit	Boone, Marion	AR	36.1745°N 93.0533°W	08:27–09:05	21.6 mi (34.8 km)	2,000 yd (1,800 m)
EF3	4 deaths – See section on this tornado – One other person was injured.						
EF0	NW of Bradleyville to SSW of Cross Roads	Taney, Douglas	MO	36.7885°N 92.91°W	08:32–08:39	4 mi (6.4 km)	150 yd (140 m)
EF0	A weak tornado snapped or uprooted trees and caused swirl marks in a field.						
EF0	SWSW of Meinert	Jasper, Dade	MO	37.3155°N 94.0835°W	08:33–08:38	3.1 mi (5.0 km)	75 yd (69 m)
EF0	Trees and a barn were damaged. An irrigation system was flipped.						
EF1	NW of Mansfield	Wright	MO	37.1833°N 92.6515°W	08:39–08:44	2.25 mi (3.62 km)	1,200 yd (1,100 m)
EF1	A large tornado downed numerous trees.						
EF3	S of Yellville to Briarcliff to NW of Elizabeth	Marion, Baxter, Fulton	AR	36.1943°N 92.6909°W	08:59–09:51	34.6 mi (55.7 km)	1,760 yd (1,610 m)
EF3	1 death – See section on this tornado – Seventeen people were injured.						
EF0	NE of Foose	Dallas	MO	37.5689°N 93.14°W	09:11–09:14	0.75 mi (1.21 km)	100 yd (91 m)
EF0	Trees and tree limbs were snapped or uprooted. One home sustained shingle damage.						
EF0	ENE of Willhoit to ESE of Brixey	Ozark	MO	36.6948°N 92.4592°W	09:19–09:28	4.86 mi (7.82 km)	50 yd (46 m)
EF0	A weak tornado occurred in the Caney Mountain Conservation Area where several trees were uprooted and large tree limbs were snapped.						
EF2	NW of Arkana to Briarcliff	Baxter	AR	36.2521°N 92.3265°W	09:26–09:36	5.3 mi (8.5 km)	400 yd (370 m)
EF2	This significant tornado was a satellite to the Briarcliff EF3 tornado. The tornado began by snapping and uprooting several trees. Some fences were also blown down and minor structural damage was noted in the area. The tornado then tracked east before turning north, almost intersecting with the larger and more intense EF3 tornado. Right at its northward turn, a home lost its roof indicating low-end EF2 damage. The tornado continued affecting neighborhoods with tree and minor structural damage before lifting.						
EF1	NNE of Oxford to WNW of Cherokee Village	Fulton	AR	36.312°N 91.8644°W	10:03–10:18	10.4 mi (16.7 km)	500 yd (460 m)
EF1	Numerous trees were snapped and uprooted, houses had siding and shingles removed, and power poles were downed. One tree fell onto a home, damaging its roof.						
EF1	E of Hardy to NE of Ravenden Springs	Sharp, Randolph	AR	36.3294°N 91.3939°W	10:58–11:14	12 mi (19 km)	600 yd (550 m)
EF1	Many trees were snapped, twisted, or uprooted. A metal outbuilding was damaged, a trailer was rolled and several other structures suffered damage as well.						
EF2	E of Myrtle to S of Doniphan to southwestern Poplar Bluff	Oregon, Ripley, Butler	MO	36.5094°N 91.1988°W	11:04–11:47	45.45 mi (73.14 km)	400 yd (370 m)
EF2	A garage was detached from a cabin, and the roof was ripped off a house, causing some of its exterior walls to collapse. Additional homes sustained roof and gutter damage. An outbuilding was destroyed. Hundreds of trees were snapped or uprooted.						
EF1	NE of Ravenden Springs to SSW of Elevenpoint	Randolph	AR	36.3478°N 91.1879°W	11:15–11:17	2.2 mi (3.5 km)	600 yd (550 m)
EF1	Numerous trees were uprooted and snapped along with a few homes suffering structural damage.						
EF1	N of Pocahontas	Randolph	AR	36.3278°N 91.0223°W	11:24–11:30	5 mi (8.0 km)	300 yd (270 m)
EF1	Several outbuildings were severely damaged or destroyed. Numerous trees were snapped or uprooted.						
EF1	Southern Pocahontas	Randolph	AR	36.2382°N 90.9539°W	11:29–11:30	0.5 mi (0.80 km)	50 yd (46 m)
EF1	A high-end EF1 tornado caused a small professional building to sustain significant roof loss. A truck was lofted and overturned. A number of electrical poles were snapped, and trees were snapped or uprooted too.						
EF2	SE of Dexter to ESE of Morley	Stoddard, Scott	MO	36.7952°N 89.942°W	12:07–12:28	25.58 mi (41.17 km)	300 yd (270 m)
EF2	A few large wooden power transmission lines were downed. A newer, well-built barn was destroyed, and a newer metal roof was ripped off a house. Numerous trees were snapped or uprooted. Irrigation equipment was overturned.						
EF3	SSE of Buffington to Sikeston to Diehlstadt	Stoddard, New Madrid, Scott	MO	36.8013°N 89.7204°W	12:15–12:35	19.57 mi (31.49 km)	300 yd (270 m)
EF3	See section on this tornado – Two indirect fatalities occurred from this tornado.						
EF1	SSW of Dublin to NW of Pryorsburg	Graves	KY	36.706°N 88.813°W	13:10–13:15	4.68 mi (7.53 km)	50 yd (46 m)
EF1	An outbuilding was largely destroyed and trees were snapped or uprooted.						
EF1	WSW of Lynn Grove to southern Murray to ESE of New Concord	Calloway	KY	36.5866°N 88.4654°W	13:25–13:46	22.01 mi (35.42 km)	100 yd (91 m)
EF1	Several structures sustained minor roof damage. Numerous trees were snapped or uprooted, some of which blocked roads and caused additional roof damage.						
EF1	SE of Faxon	Calloway	KY	36.6578°N 88.1442°W	13:35–13:39	3.99 mi (6.42 km)	150 yd (140 m)
EF1	Over 100 trees were snapped or uprooted.						
EF1	ESE of Donaldson	Trigg	KY	36.7405°N 87.9071°W	13:50–13:56	5.83 mi (9.38 km)	70 yd (64 m)
EF1	Damage was mainly confined to snapped tree limbs and uprooted trees.						
EF2	SE of Cadiz to WNW of Pembroke	Trigg, Christian	KY	36.7586°N 87.7281°W	13:59–14:14	18.96 mi (30.51 km)	250 yd (230 m)
EF2	Two homes sustained roof damage. Additional homes were damaged by numerous trees that were snapped or uprooted. Several farm buildings were damaged as well.						
EF1	WNW of Bremen to S of Livermore	Muhlenberg, McLean	KY	37.3692°N 87.2547°W	14:21–14:30	9.63 mi (15.50 km)	100 yd (91 m)
EF1	An automotive service building, power lines, and trees were damaged.						
EF1	W of Albany	Clinton	KY	36.6829°N 85.1885°W	16:21–16:24	0.72 mi (1.16 km)	250 yd (230 m)
EF1	Two barns were destroyed, a home's porch was damaged, and 2x4 planks were impaled into a corn field. Trees were damaged.						
EF1	E of Albany	Clinton	KY	36.6857°N 85.087°W	16:29–16:30	0.44 mi (0.71 km)	75 yd (69 m)
EF1	A barn was demolished, a 2x4 was thrown through a home's kitchen window, and trees were damaged.						
EF1	E of Corbin	Knox	KY	36.9466°N 84.0499°W	17:48–17:49	0.78 mi (1.26 km)	60 yd (55 m)
EF1	A tornado touched down in the parking lot of a Legacy Chevrolet, pushing several vehicles, blowing out their windows, and ripping off their gas caps. A car wash sustained damage to all of its sides and lost most of its windows. Sheds and barns were moved or flipped, including a metal carport that was tossed into trees. A house addition had its roof ripped off. Multiple trees were downed.						
EF1	Southern Jackson	Jackson	OH	39.0287°N 82.6593°W	19:28–19:32	3.77 mi (6.07 km)	125 yd (114 m)
EF1	A tractor supply building had a portion of its roof ripped off and nearby buildings sustained roof damage as well. An outbuilding was damaged and numerous trees were snapped or uprooted, some of which fell onto vehicles.						
EF0	Winfield	Putnam	WV	38.5284°N 81.8941°W	20:23–20:24	0.29 mi (0.47 km)	75 yd (69 m)
EF0	A home sustained soffit and siding damage. Trees were damaged.						
EF0	W of Janesville to Milton	Rock	WI	42.6829°N 89.1103°W	22:00–22:21	11.83 mi (19.04 km)	50 yd (46 m)
EF0	The bleachers at a high school baseball field were tossed over a fence. Trees were damaged as well.						
EF1	SW of Graff to NW of Elk Creek	Wright, Texas	MO	37.25°N 92.31°W	22:11–22:34	14.37 mi (23.13 km)	400 yd (370 m)
EF1	Numerous trees were snapped or uprooted, five outbuildings were severely damaged or destroyed, and one home sustained roof damage.						
EF1	Salem	City of Salem	VA	37.2728°N 80.0698°W	22:14–22:17	2 mi (3.2 km)	300 yd (270 m)
EF1	Several homes and apartments lost portions of their roofing. Trees were snapped or uprooted. This is the first tornado recorded in the Independent City of Salem since reliable records began in 1950.						
EF0	E of Janesville to SE of Fort Atkinson	Rock, Jefferson	WI	42.7083°N 88.9366°W	22:15–22:38	14.36 mi (23.11 km)	50 yd (46 m)
EF0	Trees were damaged.						
EF0	W of Fort Atkinson	Jefferson	WI	42.9062°N 88.9168°W	22:27–22:37	5.55 mi (8.93 km)	30 yd (27 m)
EF0	A waterspout formed over Lake Koshkonong and moved onshore, damaging trees.						
EF3	WNW of Mountain View to N of Montier	Howell, Shannon	MO	37.02°N 91.79°W	22:39–23:05	12.71 mi (20.45 km)	750 yd (690 m)
EF3	A manufactured home was completely demolished and three frame houses were severely damaged as well. Multiple outbuildings were significantly damaged or destroyed and numerous trees were snapped or uprooted. One person was injured.						
EF0	S of Fenton	Jefferson	MO	38.477°N 90.439°W	22:44–22:45	0.21 mi (0.34 km)	100 yd (91 m)
EF0	This brief tornado caused minor siding damage, uprooted a tree and blew down several large tree branches. Another tree that was uprooted landed on a house, causing damage to the house's porch and roofing.						
EF1	Oakville, MO to northwestern Columbia, IL	St. Louis (MO), Monroe (IL)	MO, IL	38.485°N 90.3757°W	22:48–23:02	8.81 mi (14.18 km)	172 yd (157 m)
EF1	A carport and a shed were damaged by a tornado that crossed the Mississippi River. Large tree branches were snapped as well.						
EF2	E of Birch Tree to SSE of Bartlett	Shannon	MO	37.0055°N 91.4618°W	23:12–23:21	3.22 mi (5.18 km)	250 yd (230 m)
EF2	This tornado occurred after the Mountain View tornado dissipated. The roof was ripped off a house, a saw mill was destroyed, and numerous trees were snapped or uprooted.						
EF0	E of Bartlett to W of Winona	Shannon	MO	37.0006°N 91.4019°W	23:20–23:23	1.74 mi (2.80 km)	75 yd (69 m)
EF0	This weak tornado formed as the Birch Tree tornado was dissipating. It snapped or uprooted several trees along the north side of US 60.						
EF1	S of Summerfield to western New Baden to Damiansville	St. Clair, Clinton	IL	38.551°N 89.752°W	23:34–23:44	10.5 mi (16.9 km)	500 yd (460 m)
EF1	Most of the roof was ripped off a commercial garage, other structures sustained minor roof damage, and large tree branches were snapped.						
EF3	N of Goreville	Johnson	IL	37.5804°N 89.0161°W	23:38–23:48	4.87 mi (7.84 km)	300 yd (270 m)
EF3	An intense tornado ripped the roof off a house and collapsed most of its exterior walls. Additional frame houses sustained damage to their roofs. Two manufactured homes were severely damaged or destroyed, causing injury to an occupant. An outbuilding was demolished. Numerous trees were snapped or uprooted, including some that were debarked. Power poles were snapped as well.						
EF0	SE of Redford	Reynolds	MO	37.3096°N 90.8999°W	23:44–23:46	3.27 mi (5.26 km)	276 yd (252 m)
EF0	Numerous large tree limbs were snapped off of trees.						
EF1	NE of Breese to SSW of Patoka	Clinton, Marion	IL	38.6649°N 89.4605°W	23:50–00:07	18.5 mi (29.8 km)	325 yd (297 m)
EF1	This tornado touched down northeast of Breese, causing significant damage as it tracked eastward. It damaged a garage, shed, and home, removing parts of roofs and breaking large tree branches. On the east side of Carlyle Lake, the tornado downed power lines, destroyed a barn, and removed most of another barn's roof. Before lifting, the tornado dealt major damage to the roof of a small outbuilding.						
EF0	SW of Annapolis to S of Saco	Reynolds, Iron, Madison	MO	37.3244°N 90.7717°W	23:51–00:11	18.23 mi (29.34 km)	167 yd (153 m)
EF0	A tornado minorly damaged trees and damaged roof paneling on an outbuilding at a farm.						
EF0	N of Exchange to NE of Ellington	Reynolds	MO	37.2468°N 91.0312°W	23:53–23:57	4.47 mi (7.19 km)	279 yd (255 m)
EF0	This tornado produced minor roof damage to an outbuilding and some tree damage.						
EF0	ENE of Fremont	Carter	MO	36.9695°N 91.1025°W	23:54–23:55	0.2 mi (0.32 km)	50 yd (46 m)
EF0	A brief tornado embedded in straight line winds damaged some trees.						
EF1	Marquand to W of Hurricane	Madison, Bollinger	MO	37.427°N 90.1639°W	00:25–00:30	5.31 mi (8.55 km)	250 yd (230 m)
EF1	A home's porch was uplifted. The roof of a barn was destroyed, causing damage to an adjacent structure. Trees were snapped or uprooted.						
EF1	SE of Kinmundy	Marion	IL	38.7288°N 88.7881°W	00:28–00:30	1.12 mi (1.80 km)	325 yd (297 m)
EF1	Several trees were snapped or uprooted within the Stephen A. Forbes State Recreation Area.						
EF2	SE of Kinmundy to SSE of Oskaloosa	Marion, Clay	IL	38.7081°N 88.781°W	00:29–00:43	8.26 mi (13.29 km)	500 yd (460 m)
EF2	Several metal buildings were destroyed, numerous trees were snapped or uprooted, and power lines were downed.						
EFU	S of Smithland	Livingston	KY	37.0764°N 88.3978°W	00:30–00:31	0.1 mi (0.16 km)	25 yd (23 m)
EFU	A tornado was filmed in an inaccessible area, therefore the tornado was given an EFU rating.						
EF0	NW of Sturgis	Union	KY	37.66°N 88.14°W	00:34–00:42	3.49 mi (5.62 km)	50 yd (46 m)
EF0	Tree limbs were downed.						
EF3	NE of Eddyville to Crider to Barnsley	Lyon, Caldwell, Hopkins	KY	37.1103°N 88.069°W	01:01–02:15	34.14 mi (54.94 km)	700 yd (640 m)
EF3	1 death – See section on this tornado – One indirect death occurred and 21 other people were injured.						
EF1	SW of Goreville to Buncombe	Union, Johnson	IL	37.5096°N 89.0815°W	01:14–01:22	6.94 mi (11.17 km)	100 yd (91 m)
EF1	A few outbuildings and a barn were severely damaged, a carport was overturned, and numerous trees were snapped or uprooted.						
EF1	S of Grayville, IL to S of Owensville, IN to Somerville, IN	White (IL), Wabash (IL), Gibson (IN)	IL, IN	38.243°N 87.9994°W	01:26–01:59	34.07 mi (54.83 km)	500 yd (460 m)
EF1	A tornado crossed the Wabash River from Illinois into Indiana. Hundreds of trees were snapped or uprooted, and the roof was ripped off a business. Billboards and a garage were destroyed. Additional roof and siding damage was inflicted to homes.						
EF1	Rixeyville	Culpeper	VA	38.5593°N 78.0636°W	01:27–01:35	4.75 mi (7.64 km)	100 yd (91 m)
EF1	Two sheds were overturned and five occupants inside one of them were injured. Numerous trees were snapped or uprooted.						
EF1	SSW of Sumner to SSE of Bridgeport	Lawrence	IL	38.6741°N 87.8635°W	01:27–01:37	6.79 mi (10.93 km)	250 yd (230 m)
EF1	A small outbuilding was destroyed, a home lost part of its roof, and another home sustained minor damage. The remainder of damage was inflicted to trees.						
EF2	Decker to NE of Willis	Knox	IN	38.517°N 87.5226°W	01:49–02:00	12.14 mi (19.54 km)	50 yd (46 m)
EF2	A strong tornado destroyed a pole barn, tossing debris over 1 mi (1.6 km). A school bus was lifted and moved about 20 yd (18 m). A garage structure had its doors pushed in causing it to collapse and debris was tossed over 1 mi (1.6 km) away. Additional trees and power lines were damaged. Tree and field damage suggest the tornado possessed multiple vortices.						
EF1	S of Ebenezer to N of Silver City to SSW of Girkin	Muhlenberg, Butler, Warren	KY	37.1897°N 87.0813°W	02:46–03:37	39.99 mi (64.36 km)	800 yd (730 m)
EF1	Two homes lost their entire roofs. The roof of one house was thrown into a nearby residence, severely damaging one of its walls. Several garages, outbuildings, storage facilities, and structures on a chicken farm lost large portions of their roofs as well. The steeple was knocked off a church and numerous trees were snapped or uprooted. Homes, outbuildings, and vehicles were damaged by fallen trees. The damage path is indicative of a broad circulation with embedded vortices rotating around the circulation.						
EF1	W of Radcliff	Meade	KY	37.8525°N 86.0207°W	03:11–03:12	1.57 mi (2.53 km)	150 yd (140 m)
EF1	Trees were uprooted and damaged and a house lost a large portion of its roof.						
EF2	Western Paragould	Greene	AR	36.0505°N 90.5774°W	04:00–04:07	3.56 mi (5.73 km)	200 yd (180 m)
EF2	Multiple homes sustained varying degrees of roof damage, including one that lost its entire roof. A couple of outbuildings were destroyed, a carport collapsed onto a vehicle, and numerous trees were snapped or uprooted.						
EF1	WNW of Cooktown to NNW of Mount Hermon	Barren	KY	36.8421°N 85.9769°W	04:06–04:15	7.49 mi (12.05 km)	150 yd (140 m)
EF1	A barn was collapsed, a few carports were damaged, and numerous trees were snapped or uprooted.						
EF1	SE of Paragould	Greene, Craighead	AR	35.967°N 90.4717°W	04:24–04:27	1.26 mi (2.03 km)	75 yd (69 m)
EF1	One home sustained minor exterior damage while a second lost most of its roof and had its exterior walls from an add-on room partially collapsed. A nearby outbuilding was also completely demolished. Elsewhere, farm equipment was blown into an open field, power lines were downed, and trees were snapped.						
EF1	NE of Persimmon to WSW of Dubre	Monroe, Metcalfe, Cumberland	KY	36.8169°N 85.6035°W	04:30–04:31	1.11 mi (1.79 km)	100 yd (91 m)
EF1	Trees were snapped or uprooted along a hillside.						
EF1	N of Burkesville	Cumberland	KY	36.8268°N 85.3714°W	04:44–04:45	0.24 mi (0.39 km)	40 yd (37 m)
EF1	Trees were snapped or uprooted by this brief tornado.						
EF1	S of Burkesville to W of Albany	Cumberland, Clinton	KY	36.6744°N 85.3764°W	04:48–04:58	10.39 mi (16.72 km)	100 yd (91 m)
EF1	An RV storage garage lost significant portions of its roof. A few cabins on a campground, as well as a few homes, sustained shingle damage. Numerous trees were snapped or uprooted.						

=== May 27 event ===
List of confirmed tornadoes – Monday, May 27, 2024
EF#	Location	County / Parish	State	Start Coord.	Time (UTC)	Path length	Max width
EF1	SE of Mercer to ESE of Medon	Madison, Hardeman, Chester	TN	35.4404°N 88.9974°W	05:55–06:07	11 mi (18 km)	550 yd (500 m)
EF1	A few homes sustained uplift of their roofs. Otherwise, numerous trees were snapped or uprooted.						
EF1	NNE of Sand Rock	Cherokee	AL	34.3007°N 85.7183°W	09:27–09:31	3.41 mi (5.49 km)	550 yd (500 m)
EF1	Numerous trees were snapped or uprooted.						
EF1	N of Newell	Randolph	AL	33.485°N 85.4444°W	11:52–11:56	3.17 mi (5.10 km)	350 yd (320 m)
EF1	This high-end EF1 tornado blew out multiple windows out of a home and damaged its roof. The roof was also blown off an outbuilding, causing its walls to collapse. Numerous trees were snapped or uprooted.						
EF1	NNE of Handy to WSW of Sargent	Coweta	GA	33.4316°N 84.9501°W	12:23–12:25	3.48 mi (5.60 km)	100 yd (91 m)
EF1	Numerous trees were snapped or uprooted, many of which fell onto homes.						
EF1	NE of Mountain Hill	Harris	GA	32.7832°N 85.0585°W	16:02–16:12	4.28 mi (6.89 km)	250 yd (230 m)
EF1	Trees were snapped or uprooted.						
EF1	W of Tyler Hill	Wayne	PA	41.7003°N 75.1748°W	22:20–22:22	0.4 mi (0.64 km)	70 yd (64 m)
EF1	A couple of barns sustained significant roof and structural damage, with debris lofted 100 ft (30 m). Trees and crops were damaged as well.						
EF0	SW of Mount Sterling	Scotland	MO	40.604°N 91.954°W	22:38–22:39	0.26 mi (0.42 km)	20 yd (18 m)
EF0	Trees and outbuildings were damaged by this high-end EF0 tornado.						
EF1	Mahanoy City	Schuylkill	PA	40.81°N 76.15°W	23:38–23:44	1.57 mi (2.53 km)	75 yd (69 m)
EF1	This tornado tracked through Mahanoy City and uprooted several trees and causing damage to roofs, including impalements of wood into structures. The tornado also damaged windows at a local elementary school and continued to uproot trees before lifting north of the town.						

=== May 28 event ===
List of confirmed tornadoes – Tuesday, May 28, 2024
EF#	Location	County / Parish	State	Start Coord.	Time (UTC)	Path length	Max width
EFU	SSW of Mount Dora	Union	NM	36.49°N 103.5°W	22:06–22:15	0.1 mi (0.16 km)	50 yd (46 m)
EFU	This brief tornado was filmed and photographed over an open field causing no damage.						

=== May 29 event ===
List of confirmed tornadoes – Wednesday, May 29, 2024
EF#	Location	County / Parish	State	Start Coord.	Time (UTC)	Path length	Max width
EFU	NNE of Creole	Cameron	LA	29.975°N 93.0598°W	18:45	0.01 mi (0.016 km)	1 yd (0.91 m)
EFU	A meteorologist for the local National Weather Service office witnessed a brief landspout in the Cameron Prairie National Wildlife Refuge.						
EF0	SW of Leader	Adams	CO	39.87°N 104.19°W	19:39–19:44	0.73 mi (1.17 km)	50 yd (46 m)
EF0	A storm chaser filmed and photographed a small landspout over an open field.						
EF0	SSW of Leader	Adams	CO	39.87°N 104.08°W	20:06–20:08	0.3 mi (0.48 km)	30 yd (27 m)
EF0	A brief landspout occurred over an open land.						
EF0	Loyalhanna	Westmoreland	PA	40.31°N 79.361°W	22:16–22:18	0.3 mi (0.48 km)	50 yd (46 m)
EF0	A few trees were snapped or uprooted, and shingles were removed from a house.						
EFU	NE of Alpine	Brewster	TX	30.42°N 103.55°W	22:50–23:05	unknown	unknown
EFU	A storm chaser observed two separate landspouts over a period of fifteen minutes. No damage occurred.						
EFU	NE of Alpine	Brewster	TX	30.42°N 103.55°W	22:50–23:05	unknown	unknown
EFU	A storm chaser observed two separate landspouts over a period of fifteen minutes. No damage occurred.						
EFU	N of St. Vrain	Curry	NM	34.62°N 103.47°W	02:45–02:47	0.1 mi (0.16 km)	50 yd (46 m)
EFU	A trained spotter documented a brief tornado.						
EFU	W of Cannon Air Force Base	Curry	NM	34.38°N 103.36°W	04:22–04:26	0.2 mi (0.32 km)	50 yd (46 m)
EFU	An emergency manager photographed a funnel in contact with the ground.						

=== May 30 event ===
List of confirmed tornadoes – Thursday, May 30, 2024
EF#	Location	County / Parish	State	Start Coord.	Time (UTC)	Path length	Max width
EFU	NW of Boise City	Cimarron	OK	36.8232°N 102.6485°W	05:34–05:36	0.68 mi (1.09 km)	50 yd (46 m)
EFU	A tornado was photographed near a campground before it was obscured by rain. No damage was reported.						
EF2	SW of Midland	Midland	TX	31.92°N 102.23°W	22:10–22:41	10.27 mi (16.53 km)	1,700 yd (1,600 m)
EF2	A dusty tornado, observed by NWS employees at the Midland office, prompted a tornado emergency for areas south of Midland. It caused damage to power poles, buildings, and RVs before becoming shrouded in rain. Although radar suggests it peaked after this time, it continued across open country before dissipating. This tornado emergency was the first-ever of such warning issued by the National Weather Service office in Midland.						
EFU	SW of Midland	Midland	TX	31.92°N 102.18°W	22:16–22:17	0.13 mi (0.21 km)	50 yd (46 m)
EFU	NWS employees observed a satellite tornado to the east of the 2210 UTC EF2 tornado and to the southeast of the Midland Airport. It remained over open country and did not cause damage.						
EFU	NNW of Sanderson	Pecos	TX	30.36°N 102.46°W	22:16–22:21	1.53 mi (2.46 km)	50 yd (46 m)
EFU	A tornado was documented over open country. It did not cause damage.						
EF3	W of Midkiff	Midland, Upton	TX	31.66°N 102.07°W	23:40–00:05	5.34 mi (8.59 km)	250 yd (230 m)
EF3	An intense tornado caused damage to vegetation, heavy oil equipment, and power poles. Ground scouring was observed as well.						
EF1	ESE of Nacogdoches to WNW of Chireno	Nacogdoches	TX	31.5876°N 94.5421°W	23:41–23:49	4.17 mi (6.71 km)	387 yd (354 m)
EF1	Many trees were snapped or uprooted, a barn sustained roof damage, and a power pole was snapped.						
EF1	SW of Grand Cane	DeSoto	LA	32.02°N 93.8785°W	00:30–00:33	2.48 mi (3.99 km)	175 yd (160 m)
EF1	Damage was limited to trees. A brief tornado debris signature was detected on radar.						
EF1	S of Grand Cane (1st tornado)	DeSoto	LA	32.0488°N 93.8248°W	00:35–00:38	1.64 mi (2.64 km)	175 yd (160 m)
EF1	Damage was mostly limited to trees. One fallen tree destroyed a mobile home.						
EF1	S of Grand Cane (2nd tornado)	DeSoto	LA	32.0496°N 93.8167°W	00:36–00:38	1 mi (1.6 km)	110 yd (100 m)
EF1	Damage was mostly limited to trees and power lines.						
EF1	NNE of Kingston to ENE of Frierson	DeSoto	LA	32.1992°N 93.7057°W	00:51–01:01	3.89 mi (6.26 km)	400 yd (370 m)
EF1	A barn was almost completely destroyed, a few manufactured homes sustained minor damage, and a small metal building system was thrown after its column anchorages failed. The metal building caused additional damage to structures and vehicles. Numerous trees were snapped or uprooted.						
EF1	ESE of Frierson	DeSoto	LA	32.2417°N 93.677°W	00:58–00:59	0.46 mi (0.74 km)	250 yd (230 m)
EF1	A brief EF1 tornado caused damage exclusively to trees.						
EF1	E of Frierson	DeSoto	LA	32.2483°N 93.6651°W	00:59–01:00	0.27 mi (0.43 km)	100 yd (91 m)
EF1	A brief EF1 tornado caused damage exclusively to trees.						
EF1	NNE of Elizabeth	Rapides	LA	30.9873°N 92.7363°W	02:16–02:22	4.12 mi (6.63 km)	50 yd (46 m)
EF1	Numerous trees were snapped or uprooted, one of which fell onto a home's roof.						

=== May 31 event ===
List of confirmed tornadoes – Friday, May 31, 2024
EF#	Location	County / Parish	State	Start Coord.	Time (UTC)	Path length	Max width
EFU	SSW of Varina	Pocahontas	IA	42.6326°N 94.9115°W	17:45–17:46	0.42 mi (0.68 km)	30 yd (27 m)
EFU	Two storm spotters photographed a tornado near the Buena Vista county line. No damage occurred.						
EF0	Eastern Sheldon	O'Brien	IA	43.182°N 95.816°W	21:14–21:17	0.95 mi (1.53 km)	75 yd (69 m)
EF0	Roof panels were peeled off three buildings and multiple RVs were flipped.						
EF0	SSE of Granville	Sioux	IA	42.942°N 95.916°W	21:36–21:38	0.72 mi (1.16 km)	25 yd (23 m)
EF0	Roof panels were peeled off a barn.						

== See also ==
- Tornadoes of 2024
- List of United States tornadoes in April 2024
- List of United States tornadoes from June to July 2024
