= List of tornadoes in the outbreak of May 25–27, 2024 =

From May 25 to 27, 2024, another major tornado outbreak occurred across the eastern half of the United States. This outbreak came just days after a previous large outbreak occurred over the central portions of the country.

== Confirmed tornadoes ==
Daily statistics
| Date | Total | EFU | EF0 | EF1 | EF2 | EF3 | EF4 | EF5 | Deaths | Injuries |
|---|---|---|---|---|---|---|---|---|---|---|
| May 25 | 15 | 3 | 2 | 5 | 2 | 3 | 0 | 0 | 9 | 123 |
| May 26 | 74 | 1 | 15 | 40 | 11 | 7 | 0 | 0 | 6 | 45 |
| May 27 | 8 | 0 | 1 | 7 | 0 | 0 | 0 | 0 | 0 | 0 |
| Total | 97 | 4 | 18 | 52 | 13 | 10 | 0 | 0 | 15 | 167 |

=== May 25 event ===
List of confirmed tornadoes – Saturday, May 25, 2024 (Note: All dates are based on the local time zone where the tornado touched down; however, all times are in Coordinated Universal Time for consistency.)
| EF# | Location | County / Parish | State | Start Coord. | Time (UTC) | Path length | Max width |
|---|---|---|---|---|---|---|---|
| EF0 | S of Hookstown | Beaver | PA | 40.5503°N 80.4682°W | 20:59–21:00 | 0.1 mi (0.16 km) | 30 yd (27 m) |
| EF0 | A utility pole was damaged and multiple trees were snapped or uprooted. | | | | | | |
| EF1 | Northeastern Windthorst | Archer, Clay | TX | 33.578°N 98.431°W | 22:16–22:24 | 3.33 mi (5.36 km) | 200 yd (180 m) |
| EF1 | A tornado was observed by numerous storm spotters and storm chasers. The tornado damaged trees in northeastern Windthorst before moving into Clay County. In Clay County, a house received some shingle damage and a barn suffered significant roof damage. The tornado dissipated shortly after. | | | | | | |
| EF1 | WSW of Bluegrove | Clay | TX | 33.632°N 98.341°W | 22:33–22:41 | 3.4 mi (5.5 km) | 100 yd (91 m) |
| EF1 | Some trees were snapped. | | | | | | |
| EF2 | NE of Cross Plains | Eastland | TX | 32.1515°N 99.1051°W | 22:42–22:48 | 2.46 mi (3.96 km) | 70 yd (64 m) |
| EF2 | A small, well-built structure was pushed about 30 ft (9.1 m) and sustained roof damage. A metal barn and a chicken coop were destroyed. One RV trailer was demolished while a second was overturned, breaking its door and windows. Several trees and at least two wooden utility poles were snapped or uprooted. The tornado may have tracked a little further northeastward past its official end point, but the area was on private property and could not be surveyed. | | | | | | |
| EF1 | SE of Mutual | Woodward | OK | 36.213°N 99.188°W | 23:14–23:20 | 2.6 mi (4.2 km) | 50 yd (46 m) |
| EF1 | At least two barns were destroyed, a trailer and farm equipment were overturned, a home received minor damage and a mobile home received roof damage. Power poles were also damaged along the tornado's path. | | | | | | |
| EFU | NNW of Chester | Major | OK | 36.288°N 98.955°W | 23:29–23:40 | 3.4 mi (5.5 km) | 200 yd (180 m) |
| EFU | This tornado was observed over inaccessible rural areas by storm chasers and research meteorologists from the National Severe Storms Laboratory. | | | | | | |
| EF0 | Hazelton | Barber | KS | 37.09°N 98.4°W | 00:15–00:18 | 1.4 mi (2.3 km) | 30 yd (27 m) |
| EF0 | A high-end EF0 tornado damaged the roofs of two metal sheds, destroyed an outbuilding, turned over an empty trailer, snapped small trees, and uprooted another tree. | | | | | | |
| EF2 | NNE of Waldron to SSE of Attica | Harper | KS | 37.0806°N 98.1424°W | 00:29–00:36 | 6.7 mi (10.8 km) | 100 yd (91 m) |
| EF2 | This strong tornado struck a farm, heavily damaging a home, destroying an outbuilding, and snapping or uprooting trees. | | | | | | |
| EFU | NNE of Burneyville | Love | OK | 33.983°N 97.263°W | 00:54 | 0.3 mi (0.48 km) | 30 yd (27 m) |
| EFU | Storm chasers observed a brief tornado. | | | | | | |
| EFU | WSW of Overbrook | Love | OK | 34.038°N 97.209°W | 01:06–01:07 | 0.5 mi (0.80 km) | 50 yd (46 m) |
| EFU | A tornado was observed. No damage occurred. | | | | | | |
| EF3 | ESE of Bowie to S of Valley View to Pilot Point | Montague, Cooke, Denton | TX | 33.526°N 97.745°W | 02:39–04:15 | 48.25 mi (77.65 km) | 3,000 yd (2,700 m) |
| EF3 | 7 deaths – See article on this tornado – 80-100 people were injured. | | | | | | |
| EF1 | ENE of Sanger | Denton | TX | 33.376°N 97.1193°W | 03:46–03:47 | 1.42 mi (2.29 km) | 800 yd (730 m) |
| EF1 | This was a satellite tornado to the larger Valley View tornado. A few homes sustained damage, including one house that lost most of its roof. At a marina, 24 RVs and motor homes in addition to floating docks and boats were damaged. Trees were damaged. | | | | | | |
| EF3 | NW of Valley Park to Claremore to NW of Pryor | Rogers, Mayes | OK | 36.3072°N 95.7651°W | 04:19–04:59 | 23.9 mi (38.5 km) | 2,000 yd (1,800 m) |
| EF3 | 2 deaths – See section on this tornado – 23 people were injured. | | | | | | |
| EF1 | SW of Marilee to NE of Celina to S of Weston | Collin | TX | 33.383°N 96.8029°W | 04:20–04:31 | 8.31 mi (13.37 km) | 800 yd (730 m) |
| EF1 | This high-end EF1 tornado touched down after the Valley View tornado dissipated. It caused damage to metal buildings, telephone poles, and trees. | | | | | | |
| EF3 | NE of Celina | Collin | TX | 33.3542°N 96.7565°W | 04:23–04:24 | 0.71 mi (1.14 km) | 175 yd (160 m) |
| EF3 | A short-lived but intense satellite tornado to the larger EF1 tornado above struck a neighborhood just northeast of Celina. At least two residences along this street sustained moderate to high-end EF3 damage with estimated maximum winds of 165 mph (266 km/h), with roofs and walls destroyed. Several additional homes sustained EF2 or EF1 damage along this street. | | | | | | |

=== May 26 event ===
List of confirmed tornadoes – Sunday, May 26, 2024
| EF# | Location | County / Parish | State | Start Coord. | Time (UTC) | Path length | Max width |
|---|---|---|---|---|---|---|---|
| EF1 | Salina (1st tornado) | Mayes | OK | 36.3196°N 95.1669°W | 05:07–05:19 | 6.1 mi (9.8 km) | 2,000 yd (1,800 m) |
| EF1 | Outbuildings were destroyed, homes were damaged, and both power poles and trees were snapped or uprooted. | | | | | | |
| EF1 | WSW of Celeste | Hunt | TX | 33.2764°N 96.279°W | 05:15–05:17 | 1.09 mi (1.75 km) | 50 yd (46 m) |
| EF1 | This was the fifth and final tornado produced by the Valley View supercell. Multiple barns and outbuildings were destroyed, several homes sustained roof damage, and one home lost the roof to its front porch as well. Trees were also damaged. | | | | | | |
| EF1 | Salina (2nd tornado) | Mayes | OK | 36.2998°N 95.1594°W | 05:25–05:30 | 2.4 mi (3.9 km) | 300 yd (270 m) |
| EF1 | Homes and businesses were damaged, power poles were downed, and trees were snapped or uprooted. | | | | | | |
| EF1 | ESE of Kenwood to SSW of Eucha | Delaware | OK | 36.3037°N 94.9146°W | 05:36–05:39 | 1.8 mi (2.9 km) | 650 yd (590 m) |
| EF1 | Trees were uprooted. | | | | | | |
| EF3 | ENE of Colcord, OK to NW of Decatur, AR | Delaware (OK), Benton (AR) | OK, AR | 36.3013°N 94.6176°W | 05:59–06:21 | 7.9 mi (12.7 km) | 3,200 yd (2,900 m) |
| EF3 | An intense and very large tornado, the largest ever recorded in Arkansas, initially touched down in Oklahoma and tracked northeastward, damaging several homes, destroying outbuildings, snapping and uprooting trees, and snapping power poles. The tornado then moved into Arkansas and steadily widened and intensified, destroying homes and outbuildings, and causing extensive tree damage. The most intense damage occurred near and north of AR 102, where the tornado reached its peak intensity and width and remained near-stationary for several minutes. Several homes were destroyed and trees were stubbed and debarked at this location before the tornado dissipated shortly afterwards. In all, 60 homes and businesses or damaged or destroyed by this tornado. | | | | | | |
| EF2 | S of Decatur | Benton | AR | 36.3231°N 94.5151°W | 06:06–06:20 | 5.4 mi (8.7 km) | 650 yd (590 m) |
| EF2 | A strong anticyclonic tornado existed simultaneously with the EF3 tornado near Decatur. It destroyed storage buildings and outbuildings, damaged homes, and snapped both power poles and trees. | | | | | | |
| EF1 | Centerton | Benton | AR | 36.3449°N 94.3265°W | 06:23–06:28 | 2.3 mi (3.7 km) | 600 yd (550 m) |
| EF1 | The roofs of homes and businesses were damaged. Trees were snapped or uprooted. | | | | | | |
| EF2 | W of Centerton | Benton | AR | 36.3283°N 94.3568°W | 06:24–06:28 | 2.4 mi (3.9 km) | 1,500 yd (1,400 m) |
| EF2 | Several homes were damaged, one severely. Outbuildings were destroyed, and numerous trees were snapped or uprooted. | | | | | | |
| EF2 | Rogers | Benton | AR | 36.3344°N 94.2002°W | 06:46–07:00 | 7.4 mi (11.9 km) | 3,000 yd (2,700 m) |
| EF2 | A strong and very large tornado damaged hundreds of homes and businesses. Thousands of trees and many power poles were snapped or uprooted. | | | | | | |
| EF1 | S of War Eagle | Benton | AR | 36.2548°N 93.9444°W | 07:10–07:16 | 3.2 mi (5.1 km) | 300 yd (270 m) |
| EF1 | A manufactured home was damaged, power lines were downed, and numerous trees were snapped or uprooted, some of which fell onto houses. | | | | | | |
| EF1 | N of Hindsville | Benton, Madison | AR | 36.2407°N 93.9029°W | 07:16–07:29 | 8.9 mi (14.3 km) | 500 yd (460 m) |
| EF1 | Trees were snapped or uprooted, and power lines were downed. | | | | | | |
| EF3 | S of Bellefonte to N of Summit | Boone, Marion | AR | 36.1745°N 93.0533°W | 08:27–09:05 | 21.6 mi (34.8 km) | 2,000 yd (1,800 m) |
| EF3 | 4 deaths – See section on this tornado – One other person was injured. | | | | | | |
| EF0 | NW of Bradleyville to SSW of Cross Roads | Taney, Douglas | MO | 36.7885°N 92.91°W | 08:32–08:39 | 4 mi (6.4 km) | 150 yd (140 m) |
| EF0 | A weak tornado snapped or uprooted trees and caused swirl marks in a field. | | | | | | |
| EF0 | SWSW of Meinert | Jasper, Dade | MO | 37.3155°N 94.0835°W | 08:33–08:38 | 3.1 mi (5.0 km) | 75 yd (69 m) |
| EF0 | Trees and a barn were damaged. An irrigation system was flipped. | | | | | | |
| EF1 | NW of Mansfield | Wright | MO | 37.1833°N 92.6515°W | 08:39–08:44 | 2.25 mi (3.62 km) | 1,200 yd (1,100 m) |
| EF1 | A large tornado downed numerous trees. | | | | | | |
| EF3 | S of Yellville to Briarcliff to NW of Elizabeth | Marion, Baxter, Fulton | AR | 36.1943°N 92.6909°W | 08:59–09:51 | 34.6 mi (55.7 km) | 1,760 yd (1,610 m) |
| EF3 | 1 death – See section on this tornado – Seventeen people were injured. | | | | | | |
| EF0 | NE of Foose | Dallas | MO | 37.5689°N 93.14°W | 09:11–09:14 | 0.75 mi (1.21 km) | 100 yd (91 m) |
| EF0 | Trees and tree limbs were snapped or uprooted. One home sustained shingle damage. | | | | | | |
| EF0 | ENE of Willhoit to ESE of Brixey | Ozark | MO | 36.6948°N 92.4592°W | 09:19–09:28 | 4.86 mi (7.82 km) | 50 yd (46 m) |
| EF0 | A weak tornado occurred in the Caney Mountain Conservation Area where several trees were uprooted and large tree limbs were snapped. | | | | | | |
| EF2 | NW of Arkana to Briarcliff | Baxter | AR | 36.2521°N 92.3265°W | 09:26–09:36 | 5.3 mi (8.5 km) | 400 yd (370 m) |
| EF2 | This significant tornado was a satellite to the Briarcliff EF3 tornado. The tornado began by snapping and uprooting several trees. Some fences were also blown down and minor structural damage was noted in the area. The tornado then tracked east before turning north, almost intersecting with the larger and more intense EF3 tornado. Right at its northward turn, a home lost its roof indicating low-end EF2 damage. The tornado continued affecting neighborhoods with tree and minor structural damage before lifting. | | | | | | |
| EF1 | NNE of Oxford to WNW of Cherokee Village | Fulton | AR | 36.312°N 91.8644°W | 10:03–10:18 | 10.4 mi (16.7 km) | 500 yd (460 m) |
| EF1 | Numerous trees were snapped and uprooted, houses had siding and shingles removed, and power poles were downed. One tree fell onto a home, damaging its roof. | | | | | | |
| EF1 | E of Hardy to NE of Ravenden Springs | Sharp, Randolph | AR | 36.3294°N 91.3939°W | 10:58–11:14 | 12 mi (19 km) | 600 yd (550 m) |
| EF1 | Many trees were snapped, twisted, or uprooted. A metal outbuilding was damaged, a trailer was rolled and several other structures suffered damage as well. | | | | | | |
| EF2 | E of Myrtle to S of Doniphan to southwestern Poplar Bluff | Oregon, Ripley, Butler | MO | 36.5094°N 91.1988°W | 11:04–11:47 | 45.45 mi (73.14 km) | 400 yd (370 m) |
| EF2 | A garage was detached from a cabin, and the roof was ripped off a house, causing some of its exterior walls to collapse. Additional homes sustained roof and gutter damage. An outbuilding was destroyed. Hundreds of trees were snapped or uprooted. | | | | | | |
| EF1 | NE of Ravenden Springs to SSW of Elevenpoint | Randolph | AR | 36.3478°N 91.1879°W | 11:15–11:17 | 2.2 mi (3.5 km) | 600 yd (550 m) |
| EF1 | Numerous trees were uprooted and snapped along with a few homes suffering structural damage. | | | | | | |
| EF1 | N of Pocahontas | Randolph | AR | 36.3278°N 91.0223°W | 11:24–11:30 | 5 mi (8.0 km) | 300 yd (270 m) |
| EF1 | Several outbuildings were severely damaged or destroyed. Numerous trees were snapped or uprooted. | | | | | | |
| EF1 | Southern Pocahontas | Randolph | AR | 36.2382°N 90.9539°W | 11:29–11:30 | 0.5 mi (0.80 km) | 50 yd (46 m) |
| EF1 | A high-end EF1 tornado caused a small professional building to sustain significant roof loss. A truck was lofted and overturned. A number of electrical poles were snapped, and trees were snapped or uprooted too. | | | | | | |
| EF2 | SE of Dexter to ESE of Morley | Stoddard, Scott | MO | 36.7952°N 89.942°W | 12:07–12:28 | 25.58 mi (41.17 km) | 300 yd (270 m) |
| EF2 | A few large wooden power transmission lines were downed. A newer, well-built barn was destroyed, and a newer metal roof was ripped off a house. Numerous trees were snapped or uprooted. Irrigation equipment was overturned. | | | | | | |
| EF3 | SSE of Buffington to Sikeston to Diehlstadt | Stoddard, New Madrid, Scott | MO | 36.8013°N 89.7204°W | 12:15–12:35 | 19.57 mi (31.49 km) | 300 yd (270 m) |
| EF3 | See section on this tornado – Two indirect fatalities occurred from this tornado. | | | | | | |
| EF1 | SSW of Dublin to NW of Pryorsburg | Graves | KY | 36.706°N 88.813°W | 13:10–13:15 | 4.68 mi (7.53 km) | 50 yd (46 m) |
| EF1 | An outbuilding was largely destroyed and trees were snapped or uprooted. | | | | | | |
| EF1 | WSW of Lynn Grove to southern Murray to ESE of New Concord | Calloway | KY | 36.5866°N 88.4654°W | 13:25–13:46 | 22.01 mi (35.42 km) | 100 yd (91 m) |
| EF1 | Several structures sustained minor roof damage. Numerous trees were snapped or uprooted, some of which blocked roads and caused additional roof damage. | | | | | | |
| EF1 | SE of Faxon | Calloway | KY | 36.6578°N 88.1442°W | 13:35–13:39 | 3.99 mi (6.42 km) | 150 yd (140 m) |
| EF1 | Over 100 trees were snapped or uprooted. | | | | | | |
| EF1 | ESE of Donaldson | Trigg | KY | 36.7405°N 87.9071°W | 13:50–13:56 | 5.83 mi (9.38 km) | 70 yd (64 m) |
| EF1 | Damage was mainly confined to snapped tree limbs and uprooted trees. | | | | | | |
| EF2 | SE of Cadiz to WNW of Pembroke | Trigg, Christian | KY | 36.7586°N 87.7281°W | 13:59–14:14 | 18.96 mi (30.51 km) | 250 yd (230 m) |
| EF2 | Two homes sustained roof damage. Additional homes were damaged by numerous trees that were snapped or uprooted. Several farm buildings were damaged as well. | | | | | | |
| EF1 | WNW of Bremen to S of Livermore | Muhlenberg, McLean | KY | 37.3692°N 87.2547°W | 14:21–14:30 | 9.63 mi (15.50 km) | 100 yd (91 m) |
| EF1 | An automotive service building, power lines, and trees were damaged. | | | | | | |
| EF1 | W of Albany | Clinton | KY | 36.6829°N 85.1885°W | 16:21–16:24 | 0.72 mi (1.16 km) | 250 yd (230 m) |
| EF1 | Two barns were destroyed, a home's porch was damaged, and 2x4 planks were impaled into a corn field. Trees were damaged. | | | | | | |
| EF1 | E of Albany | Clinton | KY | 36.6857°N 85.087°W | 16:29–16:30 | 0.44 mi (0.71 km) | 75 yd (69 m) |
| EF1 | A barn was demolished, a 2x4 was thrown through a home's kitchen window, and trees were damaged. | | | | | | |
| EF1 | E of Corbin | Knox | KY | 36.9466°N 84.0499°W | 17:48–17:49 | 0.78 mi (1.26 km) | 60 yd (55 m) |
| EF1 | A tornado touched down in the parking lot of a Legacy Chevrolet, pushing several vehicles, blowing out their windows, and ripping off their gas caps. A car wash sustained damage to all of its sides and lost most of its windows. Sheds and barns were moved or flipped, including a metal carport that was tossed into trees. A house addition had its roof ripped off. Multiple trees were downed. | | | | | | |
| EF1 | Southern Jackson | Jackson | OH | 39.0287°N 82.6593°W | 19:28–19:32 | 3.77 mi (6.07 km) | 125 yd (114 m) |
| EF1 | A tractor supply building had a portion of its roof ripped off and nearby buildings sustained roof damage as well. An outbuilding was damaged and numerous trees were snapped or uprooted, some of which fell onto vehicles. | | | | | | |
| EF0 | Winfield | Putnam | WV | 38.5284°N 81.8941°W | 20:23–20:24 | 0.29 mi (0.47 km) | 75 yd (69 m) |
| EF0 | A home sustained soffit and siding damage. Trees were damaged. | | | | | | |
| EF0 | W of Janesville to Milton | Rock | WI | 42.6829°N 89.1103°W | 22:00–22:21 | 11.83 mi (19.04 km) | 50 yd (46 m) |
| EF0 | The bleachers at a high school baseball field were tossed over a fence. Trees were damaged as well. | | | | | | |
| EF1 | SW of Graff to NW of Elk Creek | Wright, Texas | MO | 37.25°N 92.31°W | 22:11–22:34 | 14.37 mi (23.13 km) | 400 yd (370 m) |
| EF1 | Numerous trees were snapped or uprooted, five outbuildings were severely damaged or destroyed, and one home sustained roof damage. | | | | | | |
| EF1 | Salem | City of Salem | VA | 37.2728°N 80.0698°W | 22:14–22:17 | 2 mi (3.2 km) | 300 yd (270 m) |
| EF1 | Several homes and apartments lost portions of their roofing. Trees were snapped or uprooted. This is the first tornado recorded in the Independent City of Salem since reliable records began in 1950. | | | | | | |
| EF0 | E of Janesville to SE of Fort Atkinson | Rock, Jefferson | WI | 42.7083°N 88.9366°W | 22:15–22:38 | 14.36 mi (23.11 km) | 50 yd (46 m) |
| EF0 | Trees were damaged. | | | | | | |
| EF0 | W of Fort Atkinson | Jefferson | WI | 42.9062°N 88.9168°W | 22:27–22:37 | 5.55 mi (8.93 km) | 30 yd (27 m) |
| EF0 | A waterspout formed over Lake Koshkonong and moved onshore, damaging trees. | | | | | | |
| EF3 | WNW of Mountain View to N of Montier | Howell, Shannon | MO | 37.02°N 91.79°W | 22:39–23:05 | 12.71 mi (20.45 km) | 750 yd (690 m) |
| EF3 | A manufactured home was completely demolished and three frame houses were severely damaged as well. Multiple outbuildings were significantly damaged or destroyed and numerous trees were snapped or uprooted. One person was injured. | | | | | | |
| EF0 | S of Fenton | Jefferson | MO | 38.477°N 90.439°W | 22:44–22:45 | 0.21 mi (0.34 km) | 100 yd (91 m) |
| EF0 | This brief tornado caused minor siding damage, uprooted a tree and blew down several large tree branches. Another tree that was uprooted landed on a house, causing damage to the house's porch and roofing. | | | | | | |
| EF1 | Oakville, MO to northwestern Columbia, IL | St. Louis (MO), Monroe (IL) | MO, IL | 38.485°N 90.3757°W | 22:48–23:02 | 8.81 mi (14.18 km) | 172 yd (157 m) |
| EF1 | A carport and a shed were damaged by a tornado that crossed the Mississippi River. Large tree branches were snapped as well. | | | | | | |
| EF2 | E of Birch Tree to SSE of Bartlett | Shannon | MO | 37.0055°N 91.4618°W | 23:12–23:21 | 3.22 mi (5.18 km) | 250 yd (230 m) |
| EF2 | This tornado occurred after the Mountain View tornado dissipated. The roof was ripped off a house, a saw mill was destroyed, and numerous trees were snapped or uprooted. | | | | | | |
| EF0 | E of Bartlett to W of Winona | Shannon | MO | 37.0006°N 91.4019°W | 23:20–23:23 | 1.74 mi (2.80 km) | 75 yd (69 m) |
| EF0 | This weak tornado formed as the Birch Tree tornado was dissipating. It snapped or uprooted several trees along the north side of US 60. | | | | | | |
| EF1 | S of Summerfield to western New Baden to Damiansville | St. Clair, Clinton | IL | 38.551°N 89.752°W | 23:34–23:44 | 10.5 mi (16.9 km) | 500 yd (460 m) |
| EF1 | Most of the roof was ripped off a commercial garage, other structures sustained minor roof damage, and large tree branches were snapped. | | | | | | |
| EF3 | N of Goreville | Johnson | IL | 37.5804°N 89.0161°W | 23:38–23:48 | 4.87 mi (7.84 km) | 300 yd (270 m) |
| EF3 | An intense tornado ripped the roof off a house and collapsed most of its exterior walls. Additional frame houses sustained damage to their roofs. Two manufactured homes were severely damaged or destroyed, causing injury to an occupant. An outbuilding was demolished. Numerous trees were snapped or uprooted, including some that were debarked. Power poles were snapped as well. | | | | | | |
| EF0 | SE of Redford | Reynolds | MO | 37.3096°N 90.8999°W | 23:44–23:46 | 3.27 mi (5.26 km) | 276 yd (252 m) |
| EF0 | Numerous large tree limbs were snapped off of trees. | | | | | | |
| EF1 | NE of Breese to SSW of Patoka | Clinton, Marion | IL | 38.6649°N 89.4605°W | 23:50–00:07 | 18.5 mi (29.8 km) | 325 yd (297 m) |
| EF1 | This tornado touched down northeast of Breese, causing significant damage as it tracked eastward. It damaged a garage, shed, and home, removing parts of roofs and breaking large tree branches. On the east side of Carlyle Lake, the tornado downed power lines, destroyed a barn, and removed most of another barn's roof. Before lifting, the tornado dealt major damage to the roof of a small outbuilding. | | | | | | |
| EF0 | SW of Annapolis to S of Saco | Reynolds, Iron, Madison | MO | 37.3244°N 90.7717°W | 23:51–00:11 | 18.23 mi (29.34 km) | 167 yd (153 m) |
| EF0 | A tornado minorly damaged trees and damaged roof paneling on an outbuilding at a farm. | | | | | | |
| EF0 | N of Exchange to NE of Ellington | Reynolds | MO | 37.2468°N 91.0312°W | 23:53–23:57 | 4.47 mi (7.19 km) | 279 yd (255 m) |
| EF0 | This tornado produced minor roof damage to an outbuilding and some tree damage. | | | | | | |
| EF0 | ENE of Fremont | Carter | MO | 36.9695°N 91.1025°W | 23:54–23:55 | 0.2 mi (0.32 km) | 50 yd (46 m) |
| EF0 | A brief tornado embedded in straight line winds damaged some trees. | | | | | | |
| EF1 | Marquand to W of Hurricane | Madison, Bollinger | MO | 37.427°N 90.1639°W | 00:25–00:30 | 5.31 mi (8.55 km) | 250 yd (230 m) |
| EF1 | A home's porch was uplifted. The roof of a barn was destroyed, causing damage to an adjacent structure. Trees were snapped or uprooted. | | | | | | |
| EF1 | SE of Kinmundy | Marion | IL | 38.7288°N 88.7881°W | 00:28–00:30 | 1.12 mi (1.80 km) | 325 yd (297 m) |
| EF1 | Several trees were snapped or uprooted within the Stephen A. Forbes State Recreation Area. | | | | | | |
| EF2 | SE of Kinmundy to SSE of Oskaloosa | Marion, Clay | IL | 38.7081°N 88.781°W | 00:29–00:43 | 8.26 mi (13.29 km) | 500 yd (460 m) |
| EF2 | Several metal buildings were destroyed, numerous trees were snapped or uprooted, and power lines were downed. | | | | | | |
| EFU | S of Smithland | Livingston | KY | 37.0764°N 88.3978°W | 00:30–00:31 | 0.1 mi (0.16 km) | 25 yd (23 m) |
| EFU | A tornado was filmed in an inaccessible area, therefore the tornado was given an EFU rating. | | | | | | |
| EF0 | NW of Sturgis | Union | KY | 37.66°N 88.14°W | 00:34–00:42 | 3.49 mi (5.62 km) | 50 yd (46 m) |
| EF0 | Tree limbs were downed. | | | | | | |
| EF3 | NE of Eddyville to Crider to Barnsley | Lyon, Caldwell, Hopkins | KY | 37.1103°N 88.069°W | 01:01–02:15 | 34.14 mi (54.94 km) | 700 yd (640 m) |
| EF3 | 1 death – See section on this tornado – One indirect death occurred and 21 other people were injured. | | | | | | |
| EF1 | SW of Goreville to Buncombe | Union, Johnson | IL | 37.5096°N 89.0815°W | 01:14–01:22 | 6.94 mi (11.17 km) | 100 yd (91 m) |
| EF1 | A few outbuildings and a barn were severely damaged, a carport was overturned, and numerous trees were snapped or uprooted. | | | | | | |
| EF1 | S of Grayville, IL to S of Owensville, IN to Somerville, IN | White (IL), Wabash (IL), Gibson (IN) | IL, IN | 38.243°N 87.9994°W | 01:26–01:59 | 34.07 mi (54.83 km) | 500 yd (460 m) |
| EF1 | A tornado crossed the Wabash River from Illinois into Indiana. Hundreds of trees were snapped or uprooted, and the roof was ripped off a business. Billboards and a garage were destroyed. Additional roof and siding damage was inflicted to homes. | | | | | | |
| EF1 | Rixeyville | Culpeper | VA | 38.5593°N 78.0636°W | 01:27–01:35 | 4.75 mi (7.64 km) | 100 yd (91 m) |
| EF1 | Two sheds were overturned and five occupants inside one of them were injured. Numerous trees were snapped or uprooted. | | | | | | |
| EF1 | SSW of Sumner to SSE of Bridgeport | Lawrence | IL | 38.6741°N 87.8635°W | 01:27–01:37 | 6.79 mi (10.93 km) | 250 yd (230 m) |
| EF1 | A small outbuilding was destroyed, a home lost part of its roof, and another home sustained minor damage. The remainder of damage was inflicted to trees. | | | | | | |
| EF2 | Decker to NE of Willis | Knox | IN | 38.517°N 87.5226°W | 01:49–02:00 | 12.14 mi (19.54 km) | 50 yd (46 m) |
| EF2 | A strong tornado destroyed a pole barn, tossing debris over 1 mi (1.6 km). A school bus was lifted and moved about 20 yd (18 m). A garage structure had its doors pushed in causing it to collapse and debris was tossed over 1 mi (1.6 km) away. Additional trees and power lines were damaged. Tree and field damage suggest the tornado possessed multiple vortices. | | | | | | |
| EF1 | S of Ebenezer to N of Silver City to SSW of Girkin | Muhlenberg, Butler, Warren | KY | 37.1897°N 87.0813°W | 02:46–03:37 | 39.99 mi (64.36 km) | 800 yd (730 m) |
| EF1 | Two homes lost their entire roofs. The roof of one house was thrown into a nearby residence, severely damaging one of its walls. Several garages, outbuildings, storage facilities, and structures on a chicken farm lost large portions of their roofs as well. The steeple was knocked off a church and numerous trees were snapped or uprooted. Homes, outbuildings, and vehicles were damaged by fallen trees. The damage path is indicative of a broad circulation with embedded vortices rotating around the circulation. | | | | | | |
| EF1 | W of Radcliff | Meade | KY | 37.8525°N 86.0207°W | 03:11–03:12 | 1.57 mi (2.53 km) | 150 yd (140 m) |
| EF1 | Trees were uprooted and damaged and a house lost a large portion of its roof. | | | | | | |
| EF2 | Western Paragould | Greene | AR | 36.0505°N 90.5774°W | 04:00–04:07 | 3.56 mi (5.73 km) | 200 yd (180 m) |
| EF2 | Multiple homes sustained varying degrees of roof damage, including one that lost its entire roof. A couple of outbuildings were destroyed, a carport collapsed onto a vehicle, and numerous trees were snapped or uprooted. | | | | | | |
| EF1 | WNW of Cooktown to NNW of Mount Hermon | Barren | KY | 36.8421°N 85.9769°W | 04:06–04:15 | 7.49 mi (12.05 km) | 150 yd (140 m) |
| EF1 | A barn was collapsed, a few carports were damaged, and numerous trees were snapped or uprooted. | | | | | | |
| EF1 | SE of Paragould | Greene, Craighead | AR | 35.967°N 90.4717°W | 04:24–04:27 | 1.26 mi (2.03 km) | 75 yd (69 m) |
| EF1 | One home sustained minor exterior damage while a second lost most of its roof and had its exterior walls from an add-on room partially collapsed. A nearby outbuilding was also completely demolished. Elsewhere, farm equipment was blown into an open field, power lines were downed, and trees were snapped. | | | | | | |
| EF1 | NE of Persimmon to WSW of Dubre | Monroe, Metcalfe, Cumberland | KY | 36.8169°N 85.6035°W | 04:30–04:31 | 1.11 mi (1.79 km) | 100 yd (91 m) |
| EF1 | Trees were snapped or uprooted along a hillside. | | | | | | |
| EF1 | N of Burkesville | Cumberland | KY | 36.8268°N 85.3714°W | 04:44–04:45 | 0.24 mi (0.39 km) | 40 yd (37 m) |
| EF1 | Trees were snapped or uprooted by this brief tornado. | | | | | | |
| EF1 | S of Burkesville to W of Albany | Cumberland, Clinton | KY | 36.6744°N 85.3764°W | 04:48–04:58 | 10.39 mi (16.72 km) | 100 yd (91 m) |
| EF1 | An RV storage garage lost significant portions of its roof. A few cabins on a campground, as well as a few homes, sustained shingle damage. Numerous trees were snapped or uprooted. | | | | | | |

=== May 27 event ===
List of confirmed tornadoes – Monday, May 27, 2024
| EF# | Location | County / Parish | State | Start Coord. | Time (UTC) | Path length | Max width |
|---|---|---|---|---|---|---|---|
| EF1 | SE of Mercer to ESE of Medon | Madison, Hardeman, Chester | TN | 35.4404°N 88.9974°W | 05:55–06:07 | 11 mi (18 km) | 550 yd (500 m) |
| EF1 | A few homes sustained uplift of their roofs. Otherwise, numerous trees were snapped or uprooted. | | | | | | |
| EF1 | NNE of Sand Rock | Cherokee | AL | 34.3007°N 85.7183°W | 09:27–09:31 | 3.41 mi (5.49 km) | 550 yd (500 m) |
| EF1 | Numerous trees were snapped or uprooted. | | | | | | |
| EF1 | N of Newell | Randolph | AL | 33.485°N 85.4444°W | 11:52–11:56 | 3.17 mi (5.10 km) | 350 yd (320 m) |
| EF1 | This high-end EF1 tornado blew out multiple windows out of a home and damaged its roof. The roof was also blown off an outbuilding, causing its walls to collapse. Numerous trees were snapped or uprooted. | | | | | | |
| EF1 | NNE of Handy to WSW of Sargent | Coweta | GA | 33.4316°N 84.9501°W | 12:23–12:25 | 3.48 mi (5.60 km) | 100 yd (91 m) |
| EF1 | Numerous trees were snapped or uprooted, many of which fell onto homes. | | | | | | |
| EF1 | NE of Mountain Hill | Harris | GA | 32.7832°N 85.0585°W | 16:02–16:12 | 4.28 mi (6.89 km) | 250 yd (230 m) |
| EF1 | Trees were snapped or uprooted. | | | | | | |
| EF1 | W of Tyler Hill | Wayne | PA | 41.7003°N 75.1748°W | 22:20–22:22 | 0.4 mi (0.64 km) | 70 yd (64 m) |
| EF1 | A couple of barns sustained significant roof and structural damage, with debris lofted 100 ft (30 m). Trees and crops were damaged as well. | | | | | | |
| EF0 | SW of Mount Sterling | Scotland | MO | 40.604°N 91.954°W | 22:38–22:39 | 0.26 mi (0.42 km) | 20 yd (18 m) |
| EF0 | Trees and outbuildings were damaged by this high-end EF0 tornado. | | | | | | |
| EF1 | Mahanoy City | Schuylkill | PA | 40.81°N 76.15°W | 23:38–23:44 | 1.57 mi (2.53 km) | 75 yd (69 m) |
| EF1 | This tornado tracked through Mahanoy City and uprooted several trees and causing damage to roofs, including impalements of wood into structures. The tornado also damaged windows at a local elementary school and continued to uproot trees before lifting north of the town. | | | | | | |

== See also ==
- Weather of 2024
- Tornadoes of 2024
- List of North American tornadoes and tornado outbreaks
