= Handy (surname) =

Handy is a surname, and may refer to:

- Alexander Hamilton Handy (1809–1883), Mississippi jurist
- Arthur Handy (born 1967), American politician
- Chantelle Handy (born 1987), British basketball player
- Charles Handy (1932–2024), Irish management guru and author
- Chris Handy (born 1950), Australian rugby union football player
- Craig Handy (born 1962), American tenor saxophonist
- D. Antoinette Handy (1930–2002), American flautist
- Ellen Handy, American art historian and critic
- Ellice Handy (1902–1989), Singaporean educator
- Emanuel Handy (1839–1922), American politician
- Emma Handy (born 1974), British actress
- E. M. Handy (1904–1975), American football coach
- Geneva Handy (1925–2004), American pianist
- George Handy (1920–1997), American jazz arranger, composer and pianist
- Henryk Handy (1940–2007), Polish ice hockey player
- Jam Handy (1886–1983), American swimmer and water polo player
- James Handy, American film actor
- Jim Handy, American politician from Maine
- John Handy (born 1933), American jazz musician
- John C. Handy (1844–1891), American physician
- John Killeen Handy (1834–1874), politician in Queensland, Australia
- John W. Handy (born 1944), United States Air Force officer
- Captain John Handy (1900–1971), American jazz alto saxophonist
- Laura Handy (born 1980), American pair skater
- Levin Corbin Handy (1855–1932), American photographer
- L. Irving Handy (1861–1922), American educator, lawyer and politician
- Margaret Irving Handy (1889–1977), American pediatrician
- Nicholas C. Handy (1941–2012), Professor of Quantum chemistry, University of Cambridge
- Phil Handy (born 1971), American basketball coach
- Ron Handy (born 1963), Canadian ice hockey player
- Stephen Handy (born 1951), American politician
- Thomas T. Handy (1892–1982), United States Army general
- Wayne Handy (1935–2025), American rock and roll singer
- W. C. Handy (1873–1958), the "Father of the Blues"
- William Talbot Handy (1894–1983), American Methodist minister
- Willowdean Chatterson Handy (1889–1965) American ethnologist, author
- W. T. Handy, Jr. (1924–1998), American civil rights activist and United Methodist bishop
