= Handy =

Handy may refer to:

- Handy, the term for mobile phone in German-speaking countries
- Handy (company), an American cleaning and home services firm
- Handy, an emulator for the Atari Lynx, also a development name of Lynx itself

== Places ==
=== United States ===
- Handy, Georgia
- Handy, Monroe County, Indiana
- Handy, Missouri
- Handy Township, Michigan
- Handy, North Carolina

=== Elsewhere ===
- Handy Cross, Buckinghamshire, England

== People ==
- Handy (surname)
- Jack Handey, American comedian

== Entertainment ==
- Handy Awards, named after W. C. Handy, which were renamed the Blues Music Awards in 2006.
- Handy Smurf, a character from The Smurfs
- Handy (Happy Tree Friends), character from Happy Tree Friends
- Handy (magazine), owned by North American Membership Group
- "Handy" (song), recorded by "Weird Al" Yankovic in 2014

== See also ==
- Handy Andy (disambiguation)
- Handy Board
- Handy Man (disambiguation)
- Handy Writers' Colony
- Handy class destroyer
- Handycam
- Handjob, a manual sex act
