= Tornado outbreak of May 25–27, 2024 =

Weather event in the United States

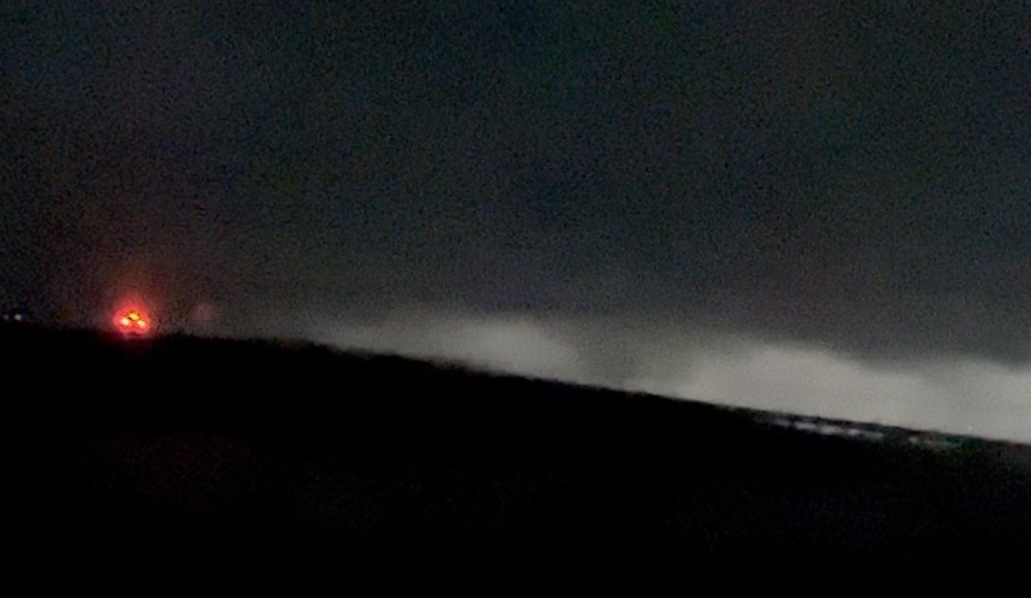
- An EF2 tornado near Washington, Indiana, on May 26

Meteorological history
- Duration: May 25–27, 2024

Tornado outbreak
- Tornadoes: 97
- Max. rating: EF3 tornado
- Duration: 2 days, 3 hours, 45 minutes
- Highest winds: Tornadic – 160 mph (260 km/h) (Eddyville, KY EF3 tornado on May 26)
- Highest gusts: Non-tornadic – 110 mph (180 km/h) (Ansted, West Virginia, May 26)
- Largest hail: 4.00 inches (10.2 cm) in Marshfield, Missouri

Overall effects
- Fatalities: 15 (+2 indirect, +10 non-tornadic)
- Injuries: 174
- Damage: $3.5 billion
- Areas affected: Midwestern, Southern and Eastern United States, Canada
- Part of the Tornadoes of 2024

A large, deadly and significant nocturnal tornado outbreak occurred during the overnight hours of May 25 into May 26, 2024. Coming just days after another significant outbreak, this was the final outbreak in what was an extremely busy April and May tornado-wise. Activity began on May 25, with isolated supercell in northern Texas producing multiple tornadoes, including a low-end EF3 tornado that passed near Valley View, Texas, killing seven people. Another longer-lived supercell moved through northeastern Oklahoma and across northern Arkansas, producing several tornadoes along with straight-line winds of 100 mph (160 km/h). Two fatalities were confirmed from an EF3 tornado that struck Claremore, Oklahoma along with areas near Pryor. Later, it produced a very large EF3 tornado near Decatur, Arkansas, which became the largest tornado ever recorded in Arkansas. Another EF3 tornado killed four people near Olvey and Pyatt while an additional tornadic death occurred with yet another EF3 tornado that passed near Yellville and through Briarcliff. Another supercell in southern Missouri produced a low-end EF3 tornado that passed near Morehouse and through Sikeston, killing two people indirectly.

May 26 would be the most active day of severe weather; several rounds of squall lines and tornadic supercells moved through the Mid-Mississippi and the Ohio Valleys, producing widespread wind damage, large hail, and tornadoes. This included a very destructive, intense high-end EF3 tornado that prompted the issuance of four tornado emergencies across areas that had been previously impacted by the 2021 Western Kentucky tornado. One person was killed by this tornado. Severe weather activity became more isolated and scattered on May 27, marking the end of the outbreak.

A total of 15 people died as a result of the outbreak, with 174 injured. Total damages from the outbreak were estimated to be around $3.5 billion.

== Meteorological synopsis ==
=== May 25 ===
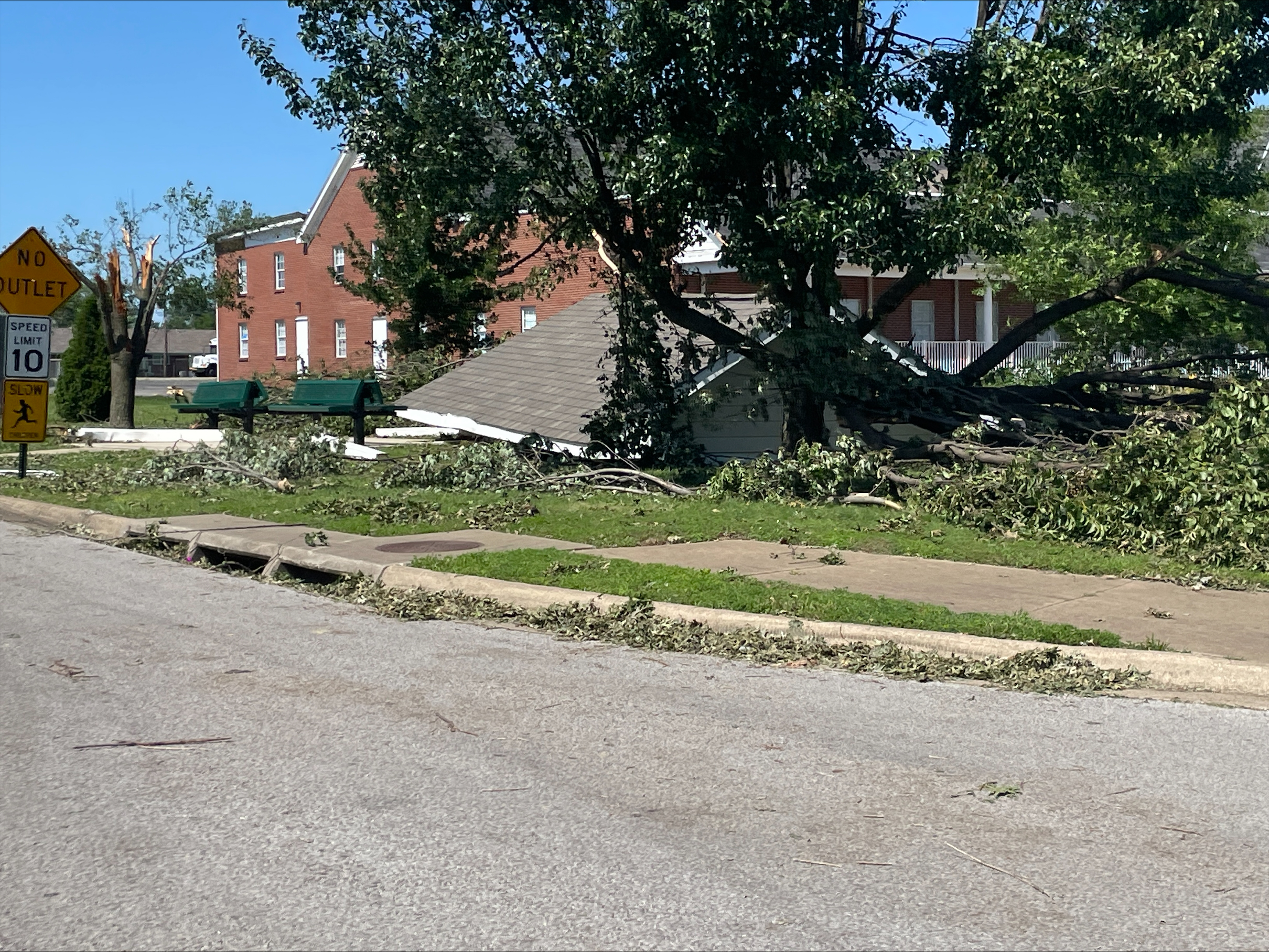
Damage from an EF2 tornado in Rogers, Arkansas.

On May 25, the SPC warned of an outbreak of severe thunderstorms across a level 4/Moderate risk area that encompassed much of Oklahoma and Kansas, as well as southwestern Missouri. In this region, forecasters expected the development of a few discrete supercells that would be capable of producing giant hail and strong to violent tornadoes. Across the northern portion of the risk, these supercells were forecast to evolve into a mesoscale convective system with swaths of damaging winds into the overnight hours. The potential for a level 5/High risk was discussed by forecasters in the preceding 24 hours given "a rare combination of instability and shear" that was depicted by model guidance. However, multiple uncertainties precluded a categorical upgrade, particularly questions about the influence of storms in Texas on the risk area farther north. A broad upper-level trough existed over the Western United States, with several embedded shortwaves, one of which was expected to translate across the risk area during the afternoon. A stationary boundary lifted northward as a warm front while a dryline sharpened from western Kansas into western Texas. In the warm sector between these boundaries, dewpoints rose into the upper 60s to even mid-70s °F, aiding in the development of extreme mixed-layer instability of 4,000–5,000 J/kg. A particularly dangerous situation tornado watch was subsequently issued for portions of extreme northern Texas, much of Oklahoma, and south-central Kansas.

Shortly thereafter, multiple supercells evolved over time across Texas and Oklahoma, but the convective evolution quickly became messy as splitting storms developed in close proximity. Additional supercells evolved across northern Oklahoma and southern Kansas, but those too underwent negative interaction with left-split storms and their accompanying outflow approaching from the south. As a result, central Oklahoma was completely void of storms for the entire day. Just before midnight, however two distinct areas of severe weather became the focus of intense tornadic activity. To the south, a discrete supercell developed within an extremely sheared environment north of the Dallas–Fort Worth metropolitan area. This supercell produced five tornadoes over the course of three hours, the first of which was a deadly low-end EF3 tornado near Valley View, Texas, before dissipating. To the north, several supercells formed in northeastern Oklahoma and southern Kansas, while a southeast-propagating mesoscale convective system developed across northern Kansas. A line of discrete storms also formed in eastern Oklahoma, but they all quickly dissipated. Meanwhile, the supercells moved eastward across northeastern Oklahoma, southern Missouri, and northern Arkansas continued into the pre-dawn hours, resulting in multiple large, intense, and fatal tornadoes. A bowing mesoscale convective system evolved across the mid-Mississippi River Valley by sunrise.

=== May 26–27 ===
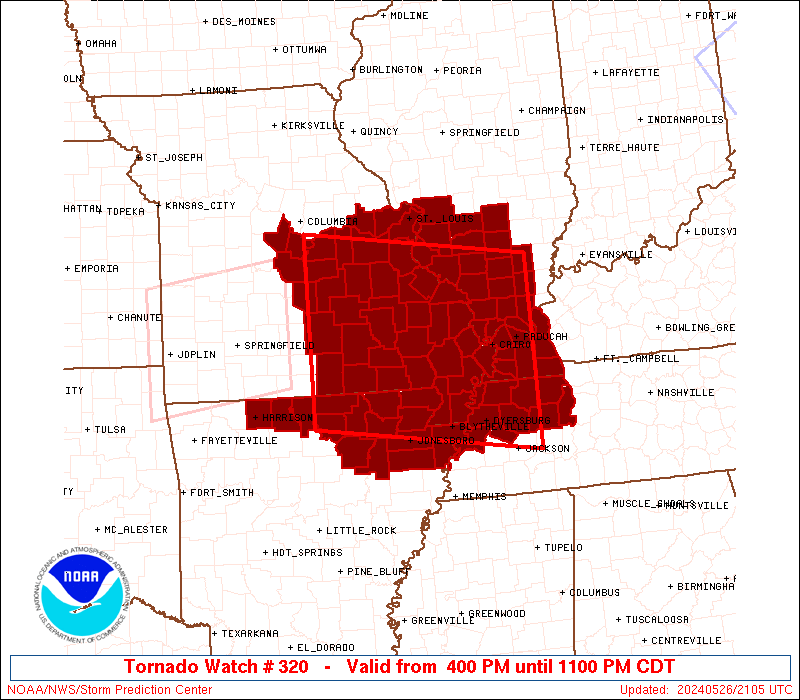
A particularly dangerous situation (PDS) tornado watch #320 issued for the Ohio Valley late on May 26

As the convective line with a history of damaging wind gusts spread eastward across the Mississippi and Ohio river valleys through the morning hours, it encountered a warming and destabilizing airmass, further increasing the severe threat. This initial line moved toward portions of West Virginia, Virginia, and North Carolina and was subsequently trailed by a secondary line of convection across western portions Kentucky and Tennessee. Cumulatively, this resulted in hundreds of damaging wind reports. Meanwhile, farther to the south and west, forecasters became increasingly concerned about a corridor from southeastern Missouri eastward into western Kentucky and adjacent areas. Here, the influx of warm and dry air aloft allowed for the rapid destabilization of the atmosphere previously impacted by morning storms. An outflow boundary from that convection was expected to become the focal point for enhanced tornadic activity. As such, the SPC outlined a level 4/Moderate risk across portions of the Tennessee and Ohio river valleys due to increased confidence in an outbreak of damaging winds and strong tornadoes. Supercells began to develop across southwestern Missouri during the early afternoon. As they continued eastward, they encountered an increasingly favorable environment, with MLCAPE over 3,500 J/kg and effective wind shear around 50 kn (60 mph; 90 km/h). Additional storms began to develop in the open warm sector across Missouri, Illinois, Indiana, and Kentucky as well. As these supercells interacted with the remnant outflow boundary, they resulted in the formation of several strong tornadoes. By the evening hours, these storms were quickly trailed by a well-organized and intense line of convection moving toward the southeast. This line remained vigorous for several hours even as it encountered a more stable airmass, but finally began to lose strength as it approached the Appalachian Mountains region, resulting in a gradually diminishing severe threat through the morning of May 27. While severe storms formed across the eastern part of the continent on May 27, only a few weak tornadoes touched down in multiple areas in Georgia and Pennsylvania, as well as an EF1 tornado near the Ontario-Quebec border in Rigaud, Quebec.

== Confirmed tornadoes ==
Confirmed tornadoes by Enhanced Fujita rating
EFU	EF0	EF1	EF2	EF3	EF4	EF5	Total
4	18	52	13	10	0	0	97

=== Forestburg–Rosston–Era–Valley View–Pilot Point, Texas ===
Forestburg–Rosston–Era–Valley View–Pilot Point, Texas
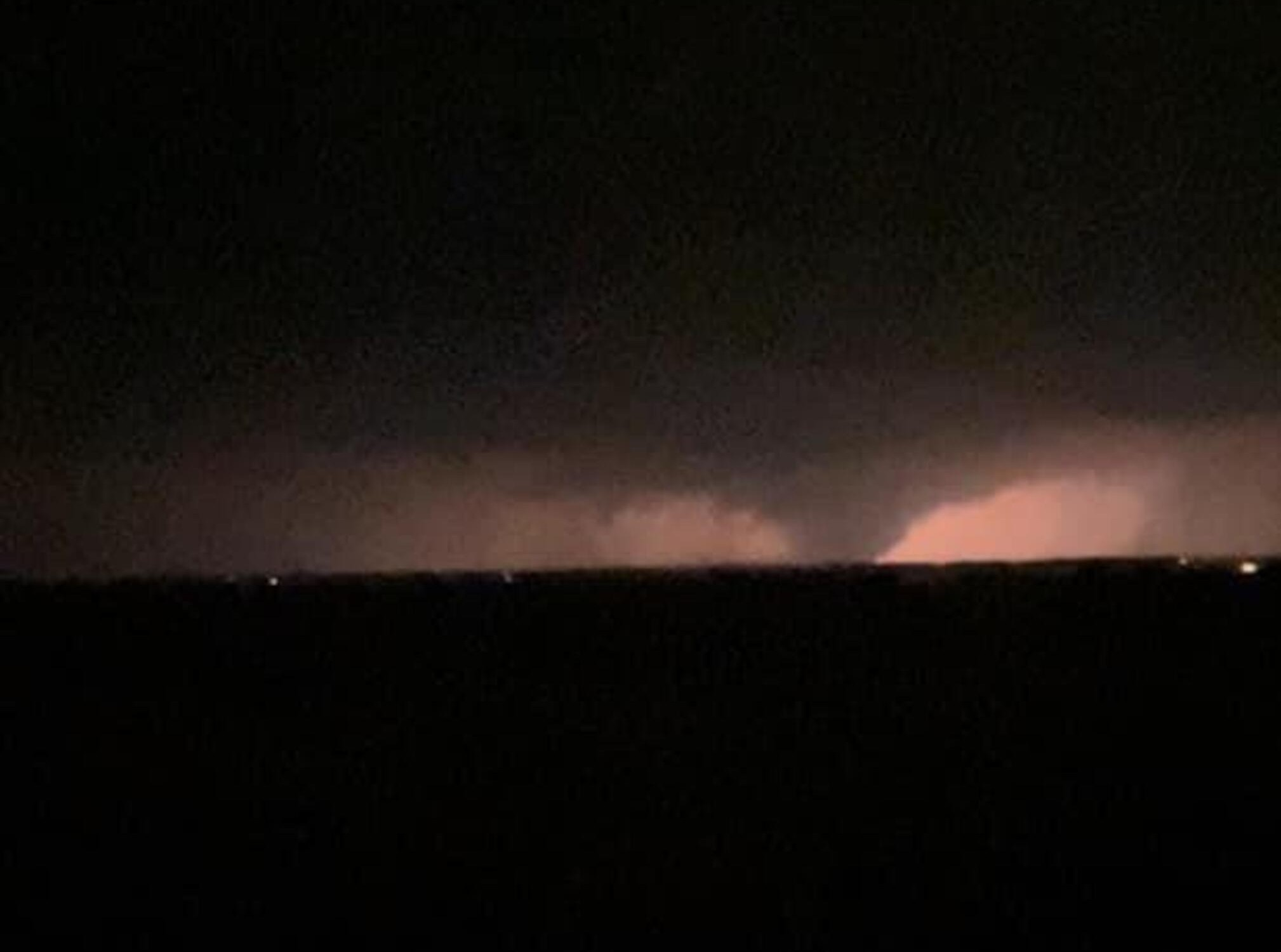
- The tornado as seen from Sanger, Texas.

Meteorological history
- Formed: May 25, 2024, 9:41 p.m. CDT (UTC−05:00)
- Dissipated: May 25, 2024, 11:15 p.m. CDT (UTC−05:00)
- Duration: 1 hour, 34 minutes

EF3 tornado
- on the Enhanced Fujita scale
- Highest winds: 140 mph (230 km/h)

Overall effects
- Fatalities: 7
- Injuries: 80–100
- Damage: $19.18 million

This very large, deadly, long-tracked tornado initially touched down southeast of Bowie in Montague County at 9:41 pm CDT. It initially caused EF0-EF1 damage to trees and outbuildings as it moved through rural areas. Moving eastward, the tornado intensified to EF2 strength, causing severe damage to two rural residences, with lesser damage being inflicted on other nearby residences. The tornado then weakened slightly as it continued eastward and passed south of Forestburg. Widespread EF0 to high-end EF1 damage to trees and outbuildings, along with minor damage to homes, was observed along this segment of the path. The tornado then turned east-southeastward, crossed into Cooke County, and passed just south of Rosston, causing widespread EF1 tree damage.

After briefly jogging to the east and weakening to EF0 strength as it approached and crossed FM 51 south of Era, the tornado strengthened again, with trees and structures suffering EF1 damage. Further strengthening occurred as the tornado began to move erratically eastward southeast of Era and west of Valley View, inflicting EF2 damage to three residences. After causing some additional EF1 damage, the tornado reached its peak intensity of low-end EF3 along County Road 200 as it turned back to the east-southeast.

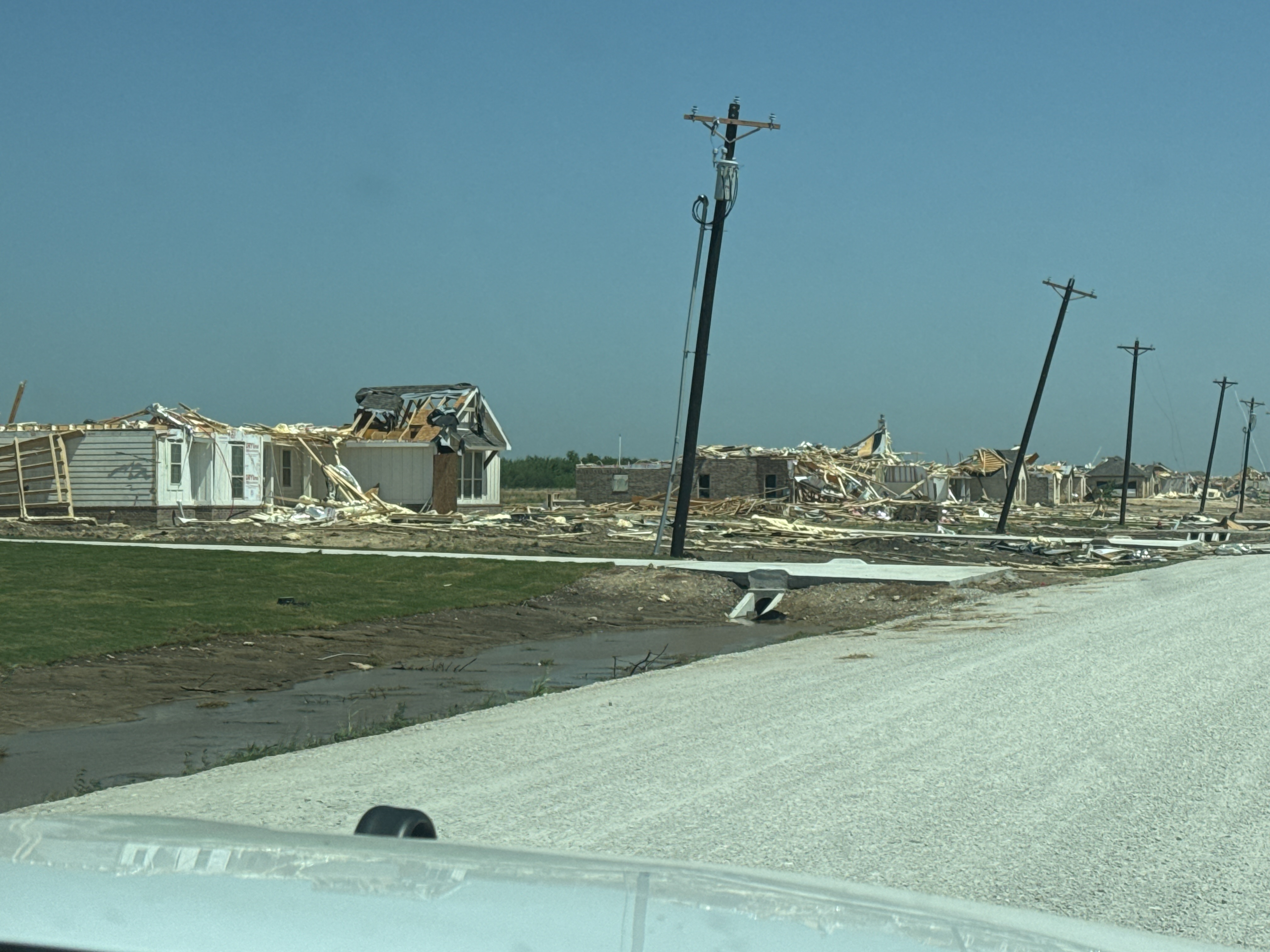
Low-end EF3 damage to several newly constructed suburban homes near Valley View.

Several newly constructed homes were heavily damaged or destroyed, with roofs removed and exterior walls knocked down. To the east, the tornado struck a neighborhood along West Lone Oak Rd at EF2 intensity, heavily damaging manufactured and mobile homes, including some that were demolished. All seven fatalities occurred at this location. The tornado was at its peak width around this time, with a damage path that was over a mile wide. Initially, it was believed that the maximum width of the tornado in this area was 1,200 yd (1,100 m) (the peak width of 1,400 yd (1,300 m) was assessed as occurring to the east just before the tornado dissipated) with several smaller circulations rotating around the tornado at this point, making it seem larger than it actually was. However, this was changed after a review in 2025 suggested otherwise. A brief EF1 satellite tornado occurred near Sanger around this time as well.

The tornado maintained high-end EF2 intensity as it crossed I-35 at the Lone Oak Road/FM 3002 interchange south of Valley View, tossing multiple cars and tractor-trailers off the interstate. On the east side of the interstate, a Shell gas station, where dozens of people had taken shelter, a metal building shop, and an RV and boat storage unit were heavily damaged or destroyed. Despite the heavy damage, no one was killed in the gas station. Continuing eastward along FM 3002 towards Ray Roberts Lake, the tornado caused additional roof damage to structures and tree damage. The tornado then weakened to EF1 strength, crossed the lake, and struck a mobile home and RV park at the Ray Roberts Lake State Park Johnson Branch on the Cooke County-Denton County border, tossing and rolling multiple mobile homes and RVs, including some that were thrown in the lake, and causing additional tree damage. The tornado then began to occlude near Pilot Point and crossed back into Cooke County. Some tree damage was observed at the end of Anderson Road before the tornado dissipated over the lake at 11:15 pm CDT.

The tornado was on the ground for over an hour and a half, reaching a peak width of 3,000 yd (2,700 m) along its 48.25-mile (77.65 km) journey. It killed seven people, making it the deadliest tornado of both the outbreak sequence and in the United States in 2024, and injured 80-100 others, excluding possible people with minor injuries that didn't require hospitalization. The tornado resulted in $19.1 million in property damage. It was also the deadliest tornado in the United States since a tornado in Tennessee killed nine people in March 2023. It was also noted that this event may have been a tornado family that featured tornadoes dissipating with others forming immediately afterwards based on radar analysis and the damage pattern, but there was not enough conclusive evidence to confirm this, so it is listed as one continuous tornado. Due to a malfunction, tornado sirens in Valley View would not sound. However, the areas affected by the tornado would not have been able to hear it. Recovery efforts were also hampered by an inch of rain that fell across the region.

=== Keetonville–Claremore–Pryor, Oklahoma ===
Keetonville–Claremore–Pryor, Oklahoma
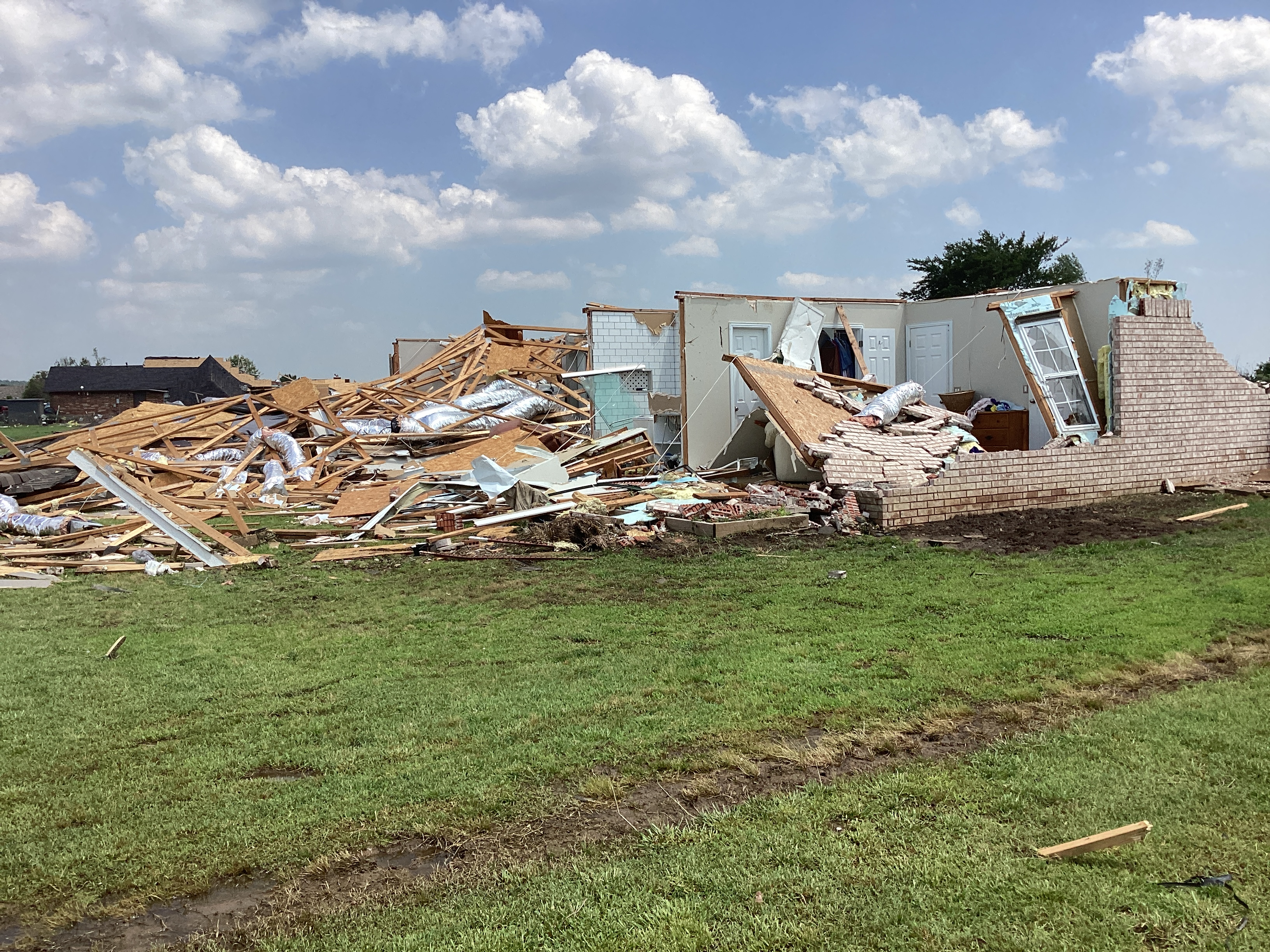
- A home that was mostly destroyed at EF3 intensity east of Claremore, Oklahoma.

Meteorological history
- Formed: May 25, 2024, 11:19 p.m. CDT (UTC−05:00)
- Dissipated: May 25, 2024, 11:59 p.m. CDT (UTC−05:00)
- Duration: 40 minutes

EF3 tornado
- on the Enhanced Fujita scale
- Highest winds: 150 mph (240 km/h)

Overall effects
- Fatalities: 2
- Injuries: 23
- Damage: $45 million

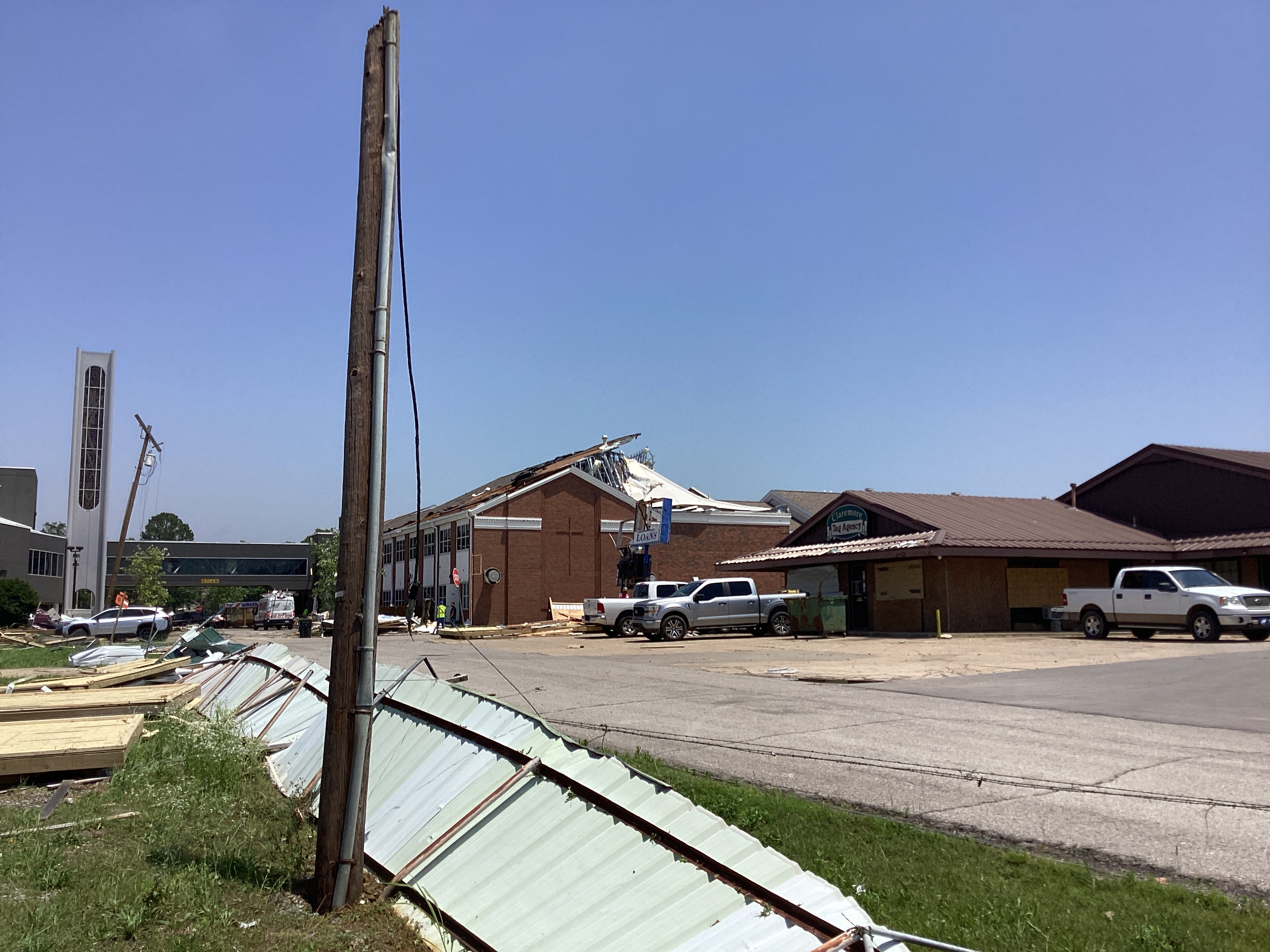
EF2 damage in downtown Claremore, Oklahoma.

This very large, intense tornado touched down on the south side of Limestone in Rogers County at 11:19 pm CDT. Upon touching down, the tornado inflicted roof damage to a home and uprooted trees at EF1 intensity. The tornado then moved eastward and strengthened to high-end EF1 intensity as it passed north of Valley Park, snapping and uprooting more trees. The tornado then passed through Keetonville, continuing to snap and uproot trees as it began to move along SH-20. The tornado then turned to the east-northeast and moved into Claremore, snapping dozens of trees, and damaging businesses, metal building systems, and other structures. An area of EF2 damage was observed just east of downtown, where two homes and a two-story building had their roofs partially removed and power poles were snapped. The tornado then continued eastward, continuing to inflict high-end EF1 roof damage to homes and snapping and uprooting trees before crossing I-44 north of Justice. The tornado then restrengthened to EF2 intensity after crossing the interstate and turning east-northeastward, partially or completely removing the roofs off several houses, including some that had exterior walls knocked down, inflicted heavy damage to the Cherokee Casino Will Rogers Downs while destroying several RVs nearby (the casino didn't reopen until three months later), flattening an outbuilding, and snapping numerous trees. The tornado then briefly reached its peak intensity of mid-range EF3 along E480 Road. Two homes had all of their exterior walls knocked with one of them having some interior walls knocked down as well. Two nearby homes suffered heavy EF2 damage as well with roofs removed and exterior walls knocked down. The tornado then briefly paralleled I-44 at high-end EF2 intensity, ripping off roofs and knocking down the exterior walls of homes, heavily damaging or destroying outbuildings, and snapping and uprooting numerous trees.

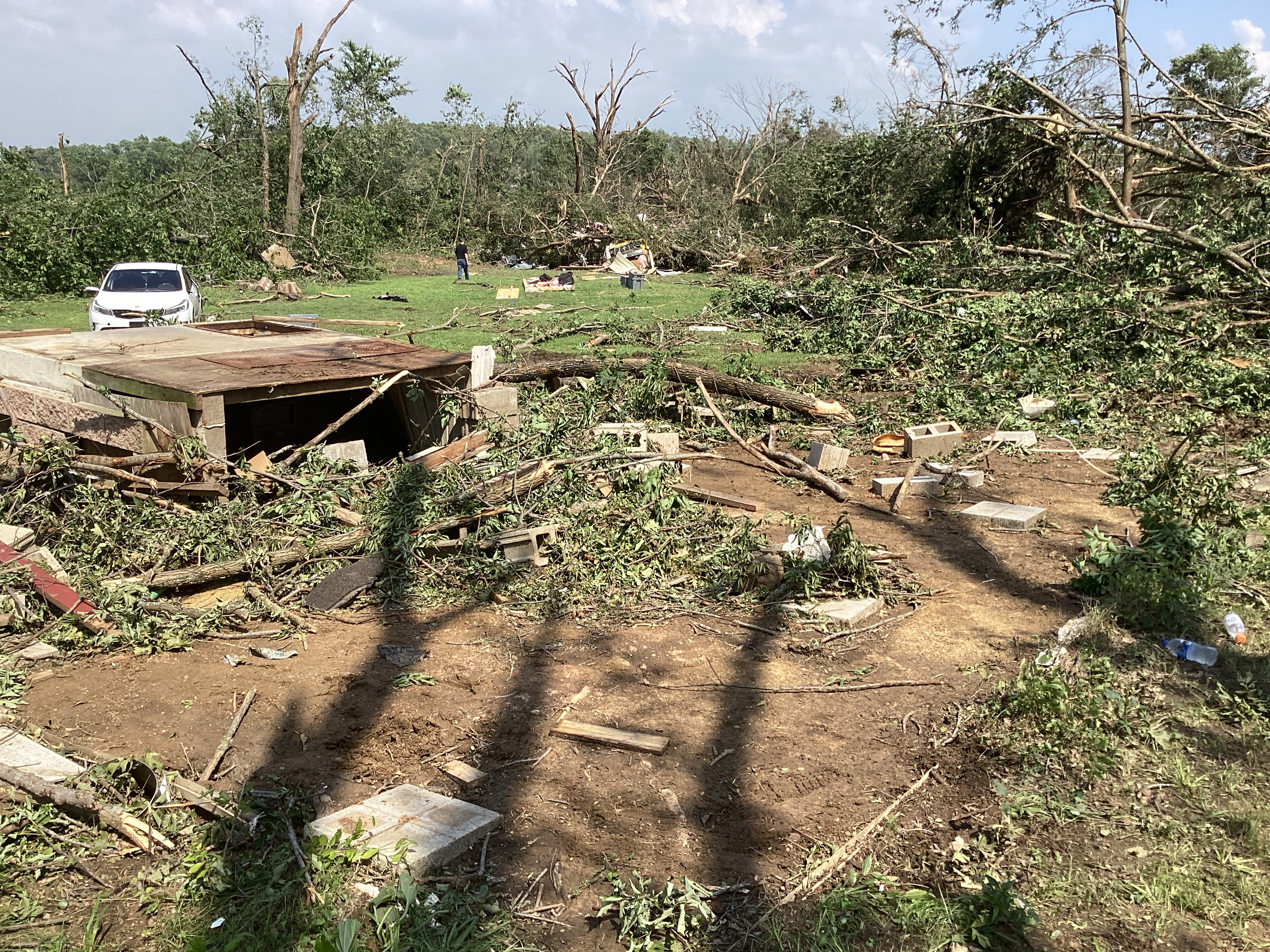
Site of a mobile home that was destroyed at EF2 intensity northwest of Pryor, Oklahoma. Two people inside were killed and four were injured.

The tornado then turned east-southeastward and moved into Mayes County, continuing to snap and uproot trees at EF2 strength. A mobile home just east of the county line was obliterated and swept away, killing two people and injuring four others. A nearby home had all of its exterior walls knocked down with damage to interior walls as well. After briefly weakening to EF1 intensity, the tornado inflicted EF2 roof damage to homes and snapped more trees. It then reached low-end EF3 intensity northwest of Pryor along N 428, knocking down the exterior walls of a home and sweeping away a mobile home. The tornado then began to quickly weaken, snapping and uprooting trees before dissipating at 11:59 pm CDT, ending its 23.9-mile-journey (38.5 km).

It was on the ground for 40 minutes, reached a peak width of 2,000 yd (1,800 m), killed two people, and injured at least 23 others. The tornado resulted in $45 million in property damage. The tornado was accompanied by extensive straight-line winds associated with the rear flank downdraft outside of the tornado track to the south, which caused additional damage.

=== Bellefonte–Olvey–Pyatt–Summit, Arkansas ===
Bellefonte–Olvey–Pyatt–Summit, Arkansas
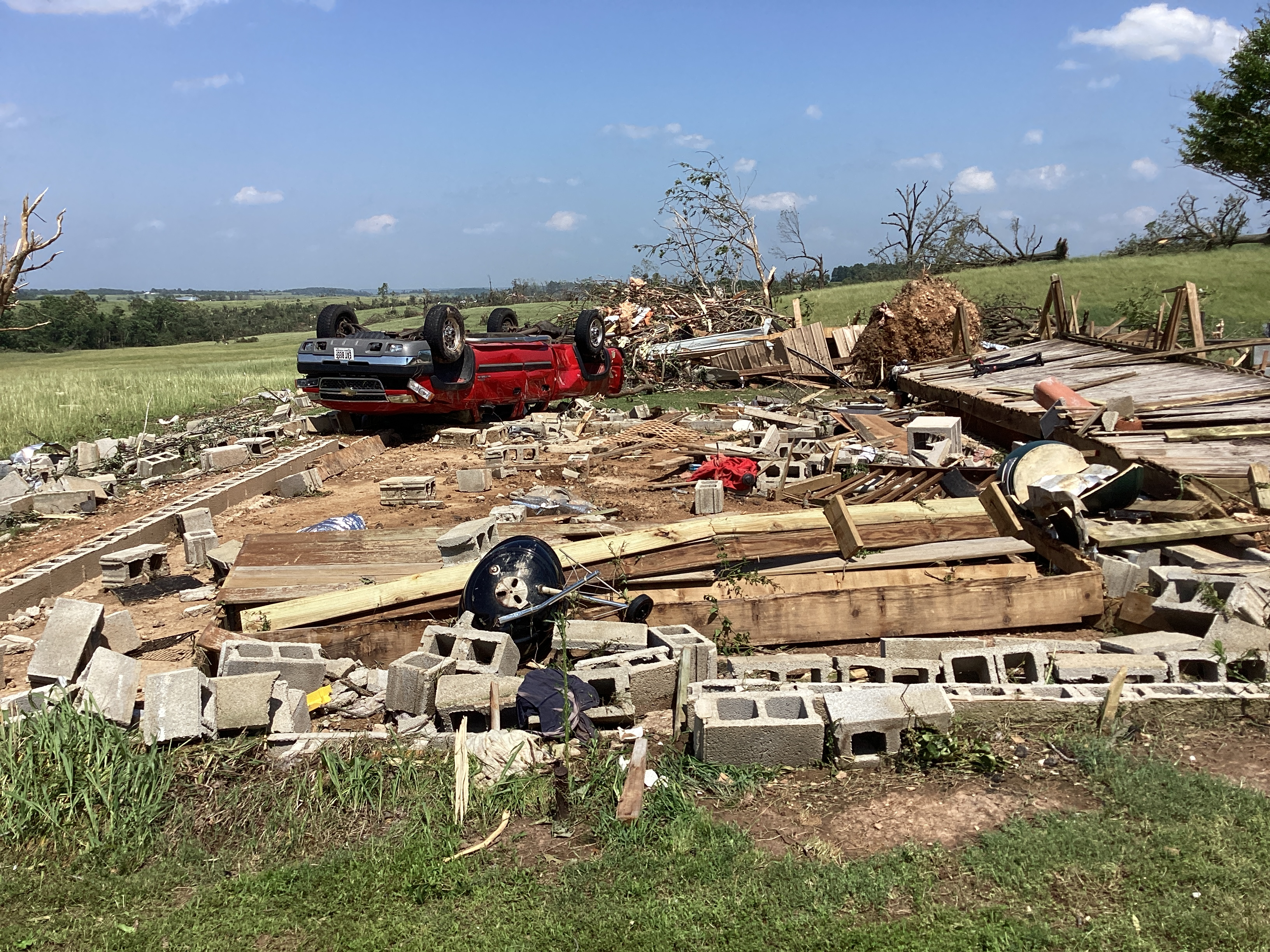
- EF3 damage to a home southwest of Olvey

Meteorological history
- Formed: May 26, 2024, 3:27 a.m. CDT (UTC−05:00)
- Dissipated: May 26, 2024, 4:05 a.m. CDT (UTC−05:00)
- Duration: 38 minutes

EF3 tornado
- on the Enhanced Fujita scale
- Highest winds: 145 mph (233 km/h)

Overall effects
- Fatalities: 4
- Injuries: 1

This very large, strong, early-morning tornado, which was spawned by the same cyclic supercell that produced the EF3 Claremore tornado, initially touched down at 3:27 a.m. CDT (08:27 UTC) south of Bellefonte, and quickly strengthened to high-end EF1 intensity as it moved east, destroying a hay barn. It also damaged trees, snapped power poles, and caused roof and exterior wall damage to houses. The tornado then weakened slightly to mid-range EF1 intensity as it continued to snap trees in an open field before crossing US 65. After crossing the highway, it caused minor damage to the roofs and light poles of the Boone County Sheriff's Department and an Arkansas State Police troop center, damaged a storage unit complex, overturned an RV, and caused a large metal building to collapse as it continued to move east. To the east of there, the tornado grew in width and continued to snap trees and power poles. It then quickly intensified to first EF2 intensity and then to low-end EF3 intensity, throwing and destroying two unanchored homes along Penny Lane, injuring one person. A nearby mobile home was lofted, rolled, and destroyed, and trees were snapped, including some that were stubbed. The tornado then turned northeastward and quickly weakened back to EF1 intensity as it passed southeast of Olvey, continuing to cause damage to trees, and killing a woman inside of a mobile home which was destroyed. Extensive EF1 tree damage continued as the tornado continued east-northeastward and crossed into Marion County, where three people were killed. It then passed south of Pyatt, where more homes suffered moderate to heavy roof damage, mobile homes were heavily damaged, including one that was rolled and destroyed, and more trees were snapped. The tornado then moved south of, and eventually crossed, US 62 where it briefly strengthened to EF2 strength. A home was heavily damaged and power poles were left leaning. After continuing northeast and snapping trees at EF1 intensity as it crossed AR 125, the tornado again briefly reached EF2 intensity. A mobile home was completely obliterated with no sign of any part of the structure being left behind and more trees were snapped. The tornado continued to cause significant tree damage until it dissipated north of Summit at 4:05 a.m. CDT (09:05 UTC).

The tornado was on the ground for approximately 38 minutes, traveling a total path length of 21.6 mi (34.8 km), and reaching a peak width of 2,000 yd (1,800 m). A total of four people were killed by this tornado and one other person was injured.

=== Yellville–Briarcliff–Elizabeth, Arkansas ===
Yellville–Briarcliff–Elizabeth, Arkansas
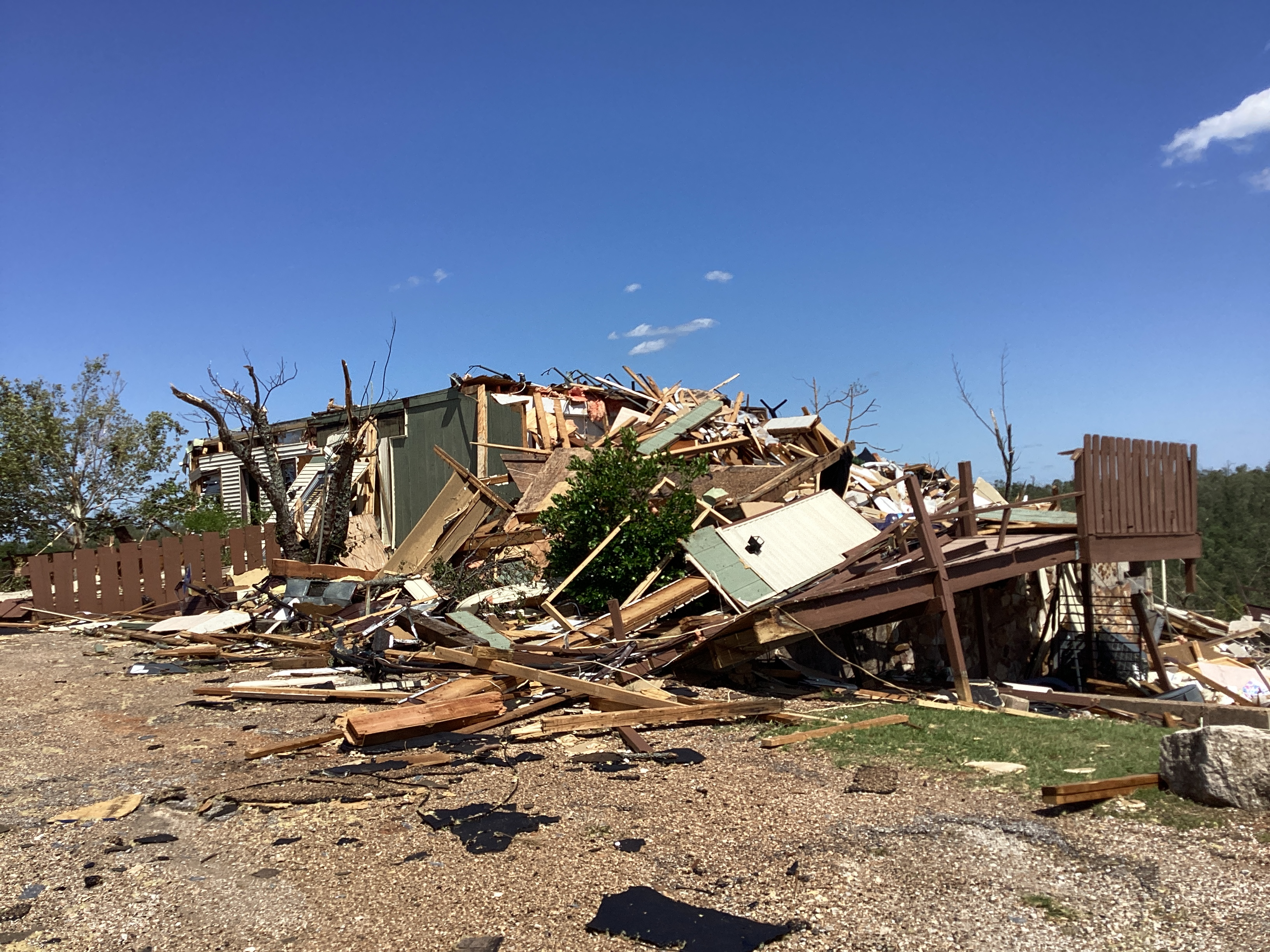
- EF3 damage to the Briarcliff City Hall building in Briarcliff, Arkansas.

Meteorological history
- Formed: May 26, 2024, 3:59 a.m. CDT (UTC−05:00)
- Dissipated: May 26, 2024, 4:51 a.m. CDT (UTC−05:00)
- Duration: 52 minutes

EF3 tornado
- on the Enhanced Fujita scale
- Highest winds: 140 mph (230 km/h)

Overall effects
- Fatalities: 1
- Injuries: 17

As the EF3 Olvey tornado was occluding and dissipating, this very large, long-tracked tornado developed at 3:59 a.m. CDT (08:59 UTC) south of Yellville in Marion County. Moving generally eastward as it fluctuated between mid-range to high-end EF1 intensity, the tornado snapped and uprooted numerous trees as it approached and then crossed AR 14. Beyond that point, the tornado continued to snap and uproot trees as it moved along county roads with some homes suffering minor roof damage as well. Further to the east along Backway Road, a mobile home and an outbuilding were shifted off their foundations, and more trees were snapped or uprooted, including one tree that fell on the mobile home. More trees were snapped or uprooted as the tornado crossed County Road 6074 and an outbuilding was destroyed. The tornado then grew significantly to over 1,000 yards (910 m) wide, snapping and uprooting numerous trees as it moved over Hand Mountain before crossing the White River into Baxter County. Some homes in a small residential area on the other side of the river suffered minor roof and siding damage and countless trees were snapped or uprooted. The tornado then reached its maximum width of 1 mile (1.6 km) as it briefly turned east-northeastward before continuing eastward, producing a widespread area of snapped and uprooted trees. The tornado then contracted slightly, producing swaths of uprooted and snapped trees before crossing the White River again. The tornado then abruptly made a sharp left turn as it passed between Arkana and Norfork and began moving north-northeast, crossing the White River a third time and approaching Briarcliff, snapping and uprooting more trees as it moved over and then away from AR 201. As it reached AR 5, the tornado increased in strength, snapping and uprooting dozens of trees, and heavily damaging homes and a metal shop building. Five fifth-wheel recreation trailers at an RV/trailer camping park were tossed and destroyed, resulting in a fatality. The tornado also snapped two-poled wooden 350 kW transmission towers and bent two pairs of double-posted steel high transmission line posts in half. Damage in this area was rated EF1-EF2.

The strong tornado then turned northeastward and once again grew to 1 mile (1.6 km) wide as it entered Briarcliff, snapping and uprooting a large number of trees as it moved over the hilly terrain. A few homes sustained moderate damage from both tornadic winds and flying debris. The most significant damage occurred on top of a hill on Scenic Drive, where the Briarcliff City Hall building had its top floor almost completely destroyed with several lower-level walls also collapsing. This damage was rated low-end EF3. Several outbuildings were destroyed, and a two-story home lost its roof as well. Areas to the west and northwest of the tornado also suffered damage due to a low-end EF2 satellite tornado that traveled in close proximity to this tornado as it moved through Briarcliff. Continuing northeastward, the tornado crossed Norfork Lake at EF1 intensity, continuing to cause widespread tree damage as it moved over peninsulas adjacent to the lake. After crossing the lake, the tornado struck the Holiday Hills Resort Area, damaging several buildings, including a smaller cabin building that was unroofed and had multiple exterior walls knocked down. By this time, the tornado was shrinking in size, although it was still uprooting large areas of trees. After crossing into Fulton County, the tornado moved erratically northeastward, snapping and uprooting additional trees before dissipating at 4:51 a.m. CDT (09:51 UTC) northwest of Elizabeth.

The tornado reached a peak width of 1,760 yd (1,610 m) along its 52-minute, 34.6 mi-journey (55.7 km). One person was killed and 17 others were injured in Briarcliff.

=== Morehouse–Sikeston–Diehlstadt, Missouri ===
Morehouse–Sikeston–Diehlstadt, Missouri
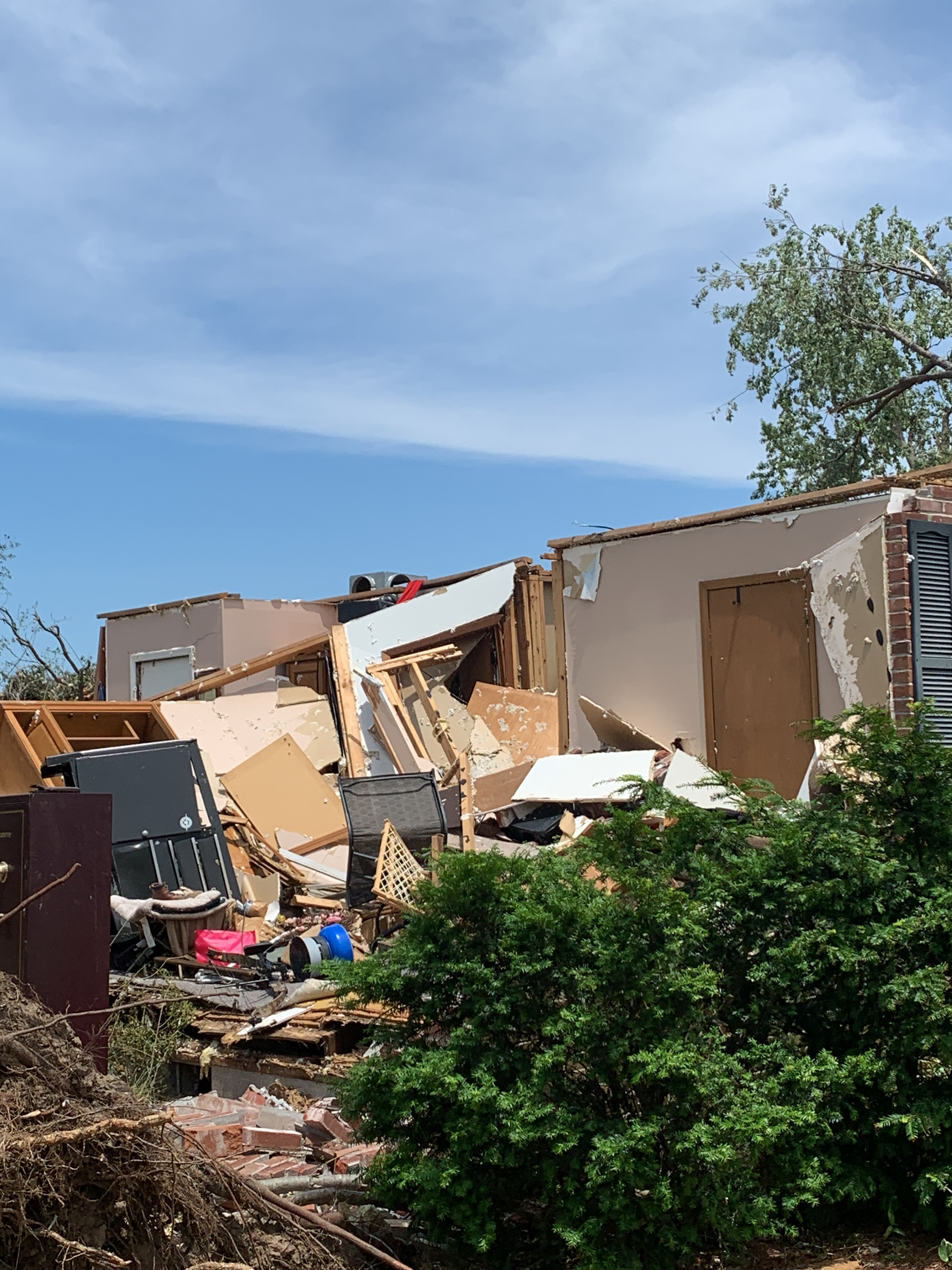
- EF3 damage to a home southwest of Sikeston

Meteorological history
- Formed: May 26, 2024, 7:15 a.m. CDT (UTC−05:00)
- Dissipated: May 26, 2024, 7:35 a.m. CDT (UTC−05:00)
- Duration: 20 minutes

EF3 tornado
- on the Enhanced Fujita scale
- Highest winds: 140 mph (230 km/h)

Overall effects
- Fatalities: 2 indirect
- Injuries: 0
- Damage: $1.757 million

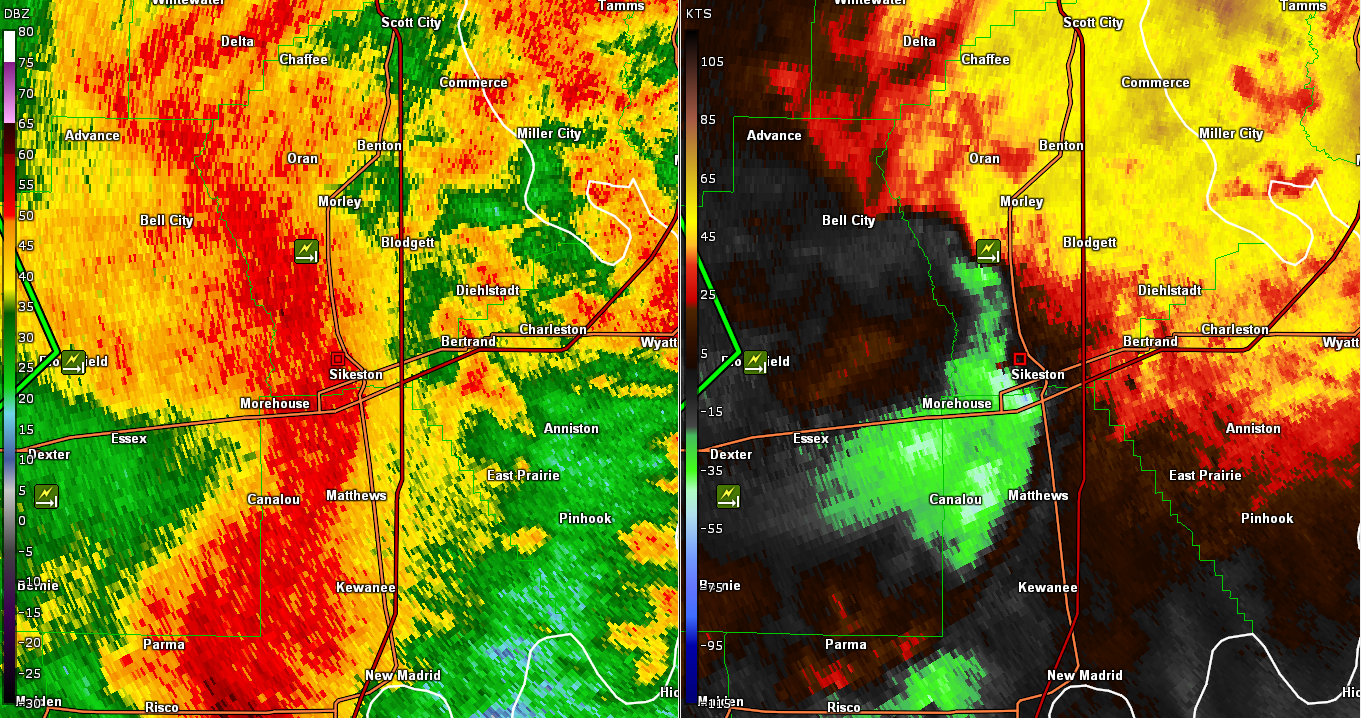
Radar image of the EF3 Sikeston tornado at as it struck Sikeston. A separate circulation to north was producing the EF2 Dexter tornado as well.

This intense, fast-moving QLCS tornado occurred along the northern edge of a much larger area of damaging straight-line winds. It first touched down at EF1 intensity northeast of Baker in Stoddard County at 7:15 am CDT, snapping a power pole along County Road 293. Moving northeastward, the tornado steadily strengthened as it crossed into New Madrid County, damaging and snapping more trees and inflicting roof damage to a home. An area of EF2 damage occurred just beyond this point where at least five consecutive wooden power poles were snapped to the south of Morehouse. After snapping more trees at high-end EF1 strength, the tornado abruptly reached low-end EF3 intensity along County Road 824. A well-built brick home had its roof removed and most of its exterior walls knocked down and wooden power poles were snapped. The tornado quickly weakened back to high-end EF1 intensity as it crossed US 60. More trees were snapped, a mobile home suffered roof damage and an outbuilding was heavily damaged. Another small area of EF2 damage occurred of along Route FF south of Browns where several wooden power poles were snapped. After flipping a center pivot irrigation system, the tornado entered Sikeston while straddling the New Madrid-Scott County line at EF1 intensity, snapping and uprooting trees, and inflicting roof, siding, and exterior wall damage to homes. The tornado then moved solidly into Scott County and through the south side of Sikeston. A widespread area of snapped and uprooted trees and roof damage to homes and outbuildings occurred. Along South Main Street (US 61/US 62), a strip mall and several businesses had their roofs partially or completely removed. The tornado continued to snap power poles and trees and damage homes as it moved northeastward until it reached US 62 again east of Sikeston, where it restrengthened to EF2 intensity. A school and a business had part of their roofs removed and large cinderblock walls knocked down, another business suffered roof damage, a tall wooden light pole at a ball field was knocked down, a home lost most of its roof, and more trees and power poles were snapped. The tornado then exited Sikeston as it continued northeastward as it approached and then crossed I-55 north of Miner, damaging outbuildings, inflicting roof damage to homes, and snapping trees at EF1 strength. Similar damage occurred after the tornado crossed the interstate and into more rural areas with center pivot irrigation systems also being damaged. The tornado then clipped the northwestern part of Diehlstadt, damaging trees before dissipating north of the town at 7:35 am CDT.

The tornado traveled 19.57 mi (31.49 km) over a span of 20 minutes, reaching a peak width of 300 yd (270 m). It caused two indirect fatalities; the first one occurred in Morehouse when a home burned down due to an unattended candle during a power outage, killing the woman inside. The second occurred later in the day in southeastern Sikeston when a tree limb fell on a man, killing him. The tornado resulted in $1.75 million in property damage.

=== Eddyville–Crider–Charleston–Barnsley, Kentucky ===
Eddyville–Crider–Charleston–Barnsley, Kentucky
- A photograph of the tornado near Eddyville, Kentucky

Meteorological history
- Formed: May 26, 2024, 8:01 p.m. CDT (UTC−05:00)
- Dissipated: May 26, 2024, 9:15 p.m. CDT (UTC−05:00)
- Duration: 1 hour, 14 minutes

EF3 tornado
- on the Enhanced Fujita scale
- Highest winds: 160 mph (260 km/h)

Overall effects
- Fatalities: 1 (+1 indirect)
- Injuries: 21
- Damage: $3.38 million

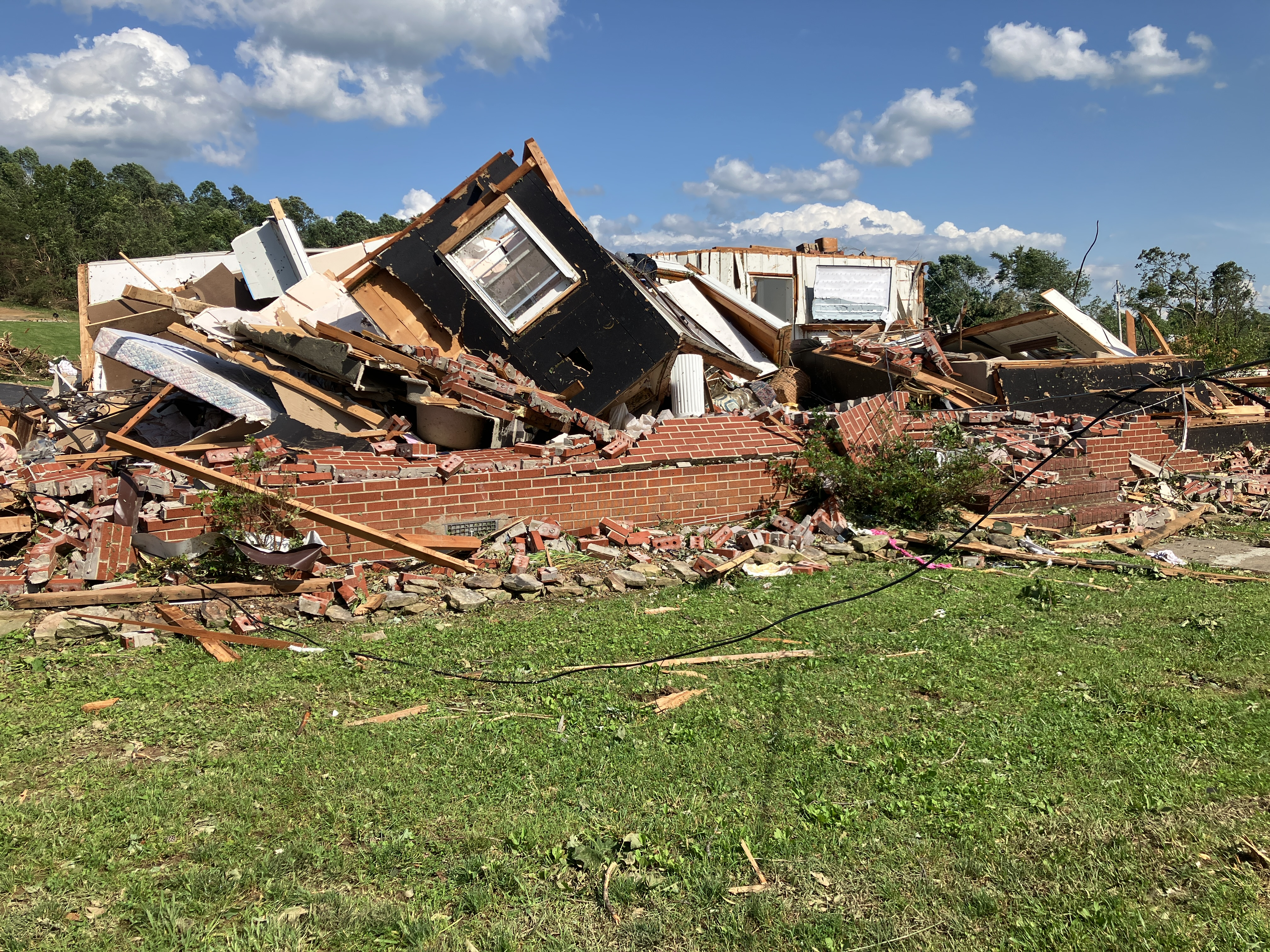
EF3 damage to a house north of Dawson Springs, Kentucky.

This long-tracked, high-end EF3 tornado paralleled I-69 along its path, striking some of the same areas affected by the 2021 Western Kentucky tornado. It touched down at 8:01 PM (00:01 UTC) in Lyon County, Kentucky, just northeast of Eddyville and moved eastward across US 641 at high-end EF1 intensity, snapping trees, damaging a home, and collapsing the roof of an outbuilding. Turning northeastward, the tornado snapped or uprooted more trees, before reaching low-end EF2 intensity as it crossed KY 3169. A home suffered heavy damage and had an exterior wall knocked down. The home's poorly built attached garage was also destroyed with the debris wrapping around the back of the structure, which left a trench in the ground. Two outbuildings were destroyed, many trees were snapped, and cycloidal scour marks were left in farm fields as well. As the tornado crossed into Caldwell County, the first of four tornado emergencies was issued as a debris ball was evident on radar and law enforcement reported that a large tornado was in progress. Upon entering Caldwell County, the tornado weakened to high-end EF1 intensity, snapping dozens of trees and damaging power poles. Southeast of Crider, a barn along KY 91 was mostly destroyed. The tornado then turned due east, snapping and uprooting more trees north of Princeton before briefly strengthening to high-end EF2 intensity, along KY 293. A mobile home was destroyed, a home was completely unroofed, and trees were snapped. Another home suffered minor roof damage as well. The tornado then turned back to the east-northeast and continued at EF1 intensity, heavily damaging an outbuilding, inflicting roof damage to homes, and snapping more trees. Another area of high-end EF2 damage occurred along Princeton Olney Road, where wooden power poles and large trees were snapped. The tornado then began to grow in size as it approached Charleston, causing widespread tree damage. Four injuries occurred in the county and an indirect death occurred the next day when man died of a heart attack during the cleanup.

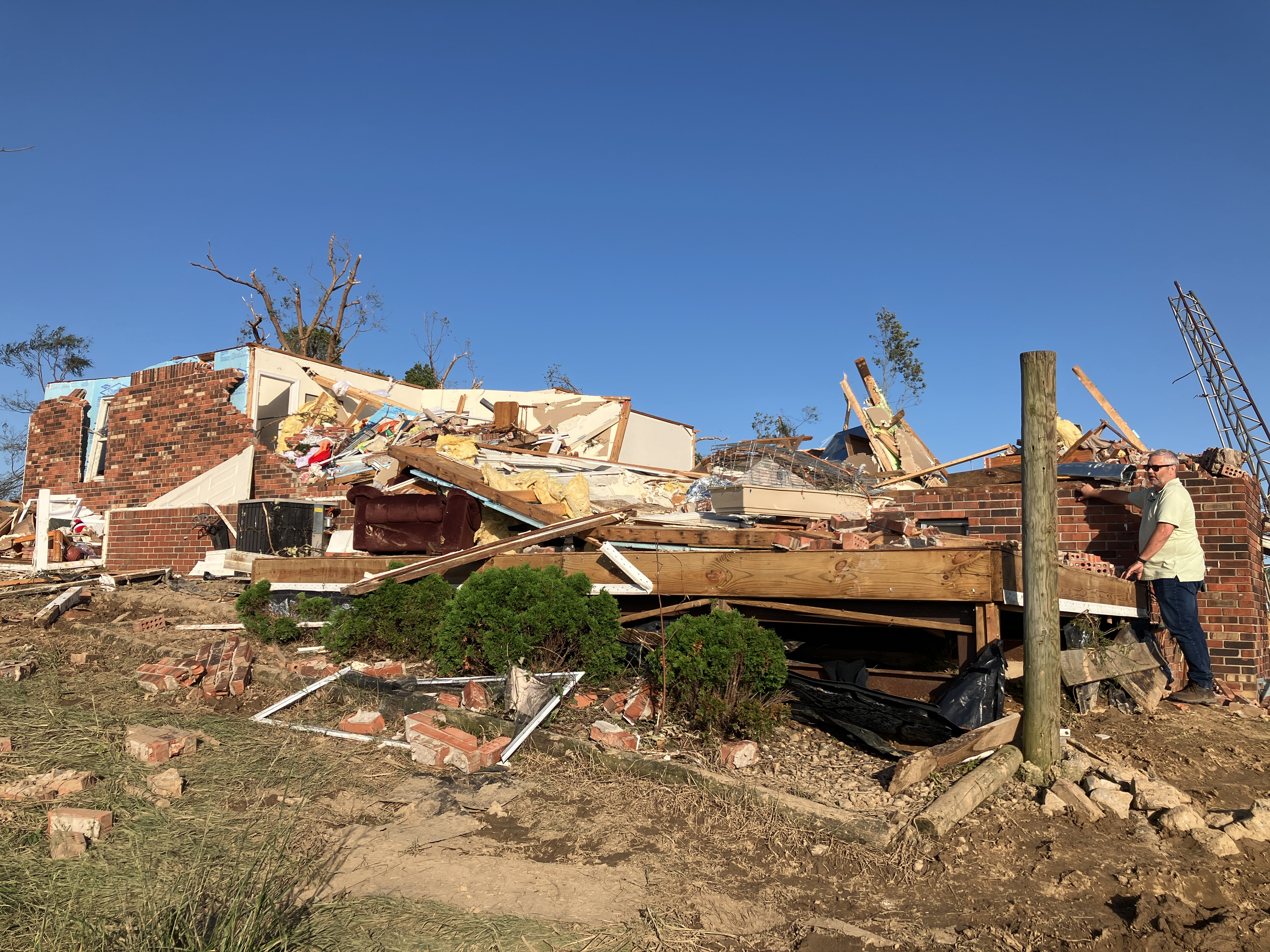
EF3 damage to a house northwest of St. Charles, Kentucky. One person inside was killed and another was injured.

As the tornado crossed into Hopkins County it reintensified to high-end EF2 intensity and reached its peak width of 700 yards (640 m) north of Dawson Springs. Several homes were severely damaged with roofs ripped off and exterior walls knocked down, outbuildings were destroyed, and many trees were snapped. The tornado then narrowed but rapidly reached high-end EF3 strength southwest of Charleston where a home was flattened. South of Charleston along KY 109, more homes were leveled, including one poorly anchored home that was removed from its foundation, other homes were heavily damaged or shifted off their foundations, outbuildings were destroyed, and more trees were snapped. Turning eastward at high-end EF2 intensity, the tornado snapped dozens of trees and obliterated two mobile homes before reaching low-end EF3 intensity along Daylight Road, flattening two poorly anchored homes. Another home was destroyed at EF3 intensity northwest of St. Charles, killing one person and injuring another before the tornado rapidly weakened to high-end EF1 strength. It snapped trees along KY 112 and moved through heavily forested areas before rapidly reaching high-end EF3 intensity as it moved directly through Barnsley and crossed US 41. A home was flattened, two double-wide mobile homes were obliterated, and trees were snapped. Immediately after leaving the town, the tornado abruptly dissipated north of Mortons Gap just before crossing I-69 at 9:15 PM (02:15 UTC). The parent supercell was rapidly absorbed by a squall line at that time, which caused the tornadic circulation to dissipate.

The tornado was on the ground for 74 minutes, traveling 34.14 miles (54.94 km), and reaching a peak width of 700 yards (640 m). One person was killed, and 21 others were injured. The tornado resulted in $3.38 million in property damage.

== Impact ==
The start of the 2024 Indianapolis 500 was delayed on May 26th due to thunderstorms near the event. On May 27, a New York Mets game against the Los Angeles Dodgers was postponed for a day due to the severe storms, with severe storms also resulting in ground stops at both LaGuardia Airport and John F. Kennedy International Airport. Up to 2.67 in (68 mm) of rain fell in Roxbury Township, New Jersey. One person was killed in Colorado due to a lightning strike, while another person was killed when straight-line winds downed a tree onto them in Anchorage, Kentucky. A very large area of damaging straight-line winds impacted Central Alabama on May 27. Many large tree limbs were snapped, some trees were uprooted, and at least one home suffered minor exterior damage.

=== Southern United States ===
The May 25–26 severe weather outbreak killed at least 26 people in total, including seven in Texas, two in Oklahoma, eight in Arkansas, five in Kentucky, one in Alabama, two in Missouri, and one in Colorado. At least 16 of these deaths were due to tornadoes.

== See also ==
- Weather of 2024
- Research on tornadoes in 2024
- List of North American tornadoes and tornado outbreaks
- List of derecho events
- List of F4 and EF4 tornadoes
  - List of F4 and EF4 tornadoes (2020–present)
- List of tornadoes observed by mobile radars
- Tornado outbreak and derecho of April 1–3, 2024 – another significant severe weather event that happened less than two months earlier.
- List of United States tornadoes in May 2024
