= Will Rogers Downs =

Horse racing track in Rogers County, Oklahoma

Cherokee Casino Will Rogers Downs
- Interactive map of Cherokee Casino Will Rogers Downs
- Location: Rogers County, United States
- Coordinates: 36°18′40″N 95°31′57″W
- Owned by: Cherokee Nation
- Course type: Thoroughbred flat racing & Quarter Horse racing
- Notable races: Clem McSpadden Memorial Route 66 Stakes

Cherokee Casino Will Rogers Downs is a gaming facility and horse racing track located in Rogers County, near Tulsa, Oklahoma and immediately northeast of Justice. The track is owned and operated by the Cherokee Nation.

Quarter Horse races are held September-to-November. Thoroughbred horse racing takes place from March-to-May. The track also features Appaloosa and Paint races.

The facility features a 2,700-seat grandstand along a one-mile-long track. The facility's casino section has 250 electronic gaming machines. Also, on the grounds of the Downs complex is the largest RV park in Oklahoma.

On the night of May 25, 2024, the casino was struck and heavily damaged by an EF3 tornado that had previously damaged Claremore. The tornado heavily damaged the facility and destroyed several RVs.
