= W. T. Handy, Jr. =

American Methodist bishop

The Reverend Bishop W.T. Handy, Jr.
- Missouri Annual Conference
- Diocese: Missouri Annual Conference
- See: South Central Jurisdiction
- Installed: 1980
- Term ended: 1992
- Other post: Louisiana Conference District Superintendent

Orders
- Ordination: 1950

Personal details
- Born: William Talbot Handy, Jr. 1924 New Orleans, Louisiana, U.S.
- Died: April 12, 1998 (aged 73–74) Nashville, Tennessee, U.S.
- Denomination: United Methodist
- Parents: William Talbot Handy; Dorothy Pauline Pleasant
- Spouse: Ruth Robinson
- Children: 3
- Occupation: minister activist
- Education: Dillard University (BA); Gammon Theological Seminary (BD); Boston University (MTS)

Styles of William Talbot Handy, Jr.
- Reference style: The Reverend Bishop
- Religious style: Bishop

William Talbot Handy, Jr. (1924 – 1998) was an American civil rights activist and Methodist bishop. He served as the residing bishop of the Missouri Annual Conference of the United Methodist Church from 1980 to 1992. A friend of Rev. Martin Luther King, Jr., Handy was active in the Civil Rights movement and helped lead the Louisiana State Advisory Committee of the United States Commission on Civil Rights and the Baton Rouge chapter of the National Association for the Advancement of Colored People. He was the first African-American to serve in an executive capacity at the United Methodist Publishing House.

== Early life and family ==
Handy was born in 1924 in New Orleans to Dorothy Pauline Pleasant, a music teacher, and Rev. William Talbot Handy, a choir member of the Tuskeegee University Quartet and a Methodist minister and district superintendent who sang at the funeral of Booker T. Washington. His parents owned Handy Heights, a 116-acre farm in Hazlehurst, Mississippi. Handy was the brother of the flutist D. Antoinette Handy and the pianist Geneva Handy Southall.

Handy was a great-great-grandson of Mississippi Supreme Court justice and slaveowner Ephraim G. Peyton, an American Civil War veteran, and Mississippi state legislator Emanuel Handy.

== Education ==
Handy graduated from Dillard University in 1948 with a bachelor of arts degree. He earned a bachelor of divinity degree from Gammon Theological Seminary and a Master of Theological Studies degree from Boston University's School of Theology, where he befriended Rev. Martin Luther King, Jr.

== Activism and ministry ==
Handy, like his friend King, was active in the Civil Rights Movement. He helped lead the Louisiana State Advisory Committee of the United States Commission on Civil Rights, the Baton Rouge Council on Human Relations, the Baton Rouge chapter of the National Association for the Advancement of Colored People, and the Louisiana Council of Churches.

Handy was ordained as a deacon in 1950 and as an elder in 1951 by the Louisiana Conference of the Methodist Church. From 1952 to 1959, he served as pastor of Newman Methodist Church in Alexandria, Louisiana. Following that appointment, he served as the pastor of St. Mark Methodist Church in Baton Rouge, Louisiana. Hand

In 1968, Handy was the first African-American hired to serve in an executive capacity at the United Methodist Publishing House, a denominational agency in Nashville, Tennessee that had previously been accused of racial bigotry. In 1978, he returned to Louisiana to serve as the district superintendent. On July 15, 1980, he was elected bishop at the South Central Jurisdictional Conference in Little Rock, Arkansas and assigned to lead the Missouri Area of the United Methodist Church.

Handy served as president of the board of trustees for the Interdenominational Theological Center in Atlanta, Georgia and as secretary of the board of trustees of Southern Methodist University in Dallas, Texas.

He retired from public ministry in 1992.

== Personal life ==
Handy married Ruth Robinson, whom he met at Dillard University, on August 11, 1948. They had three children: Dorothy, Stephen, and Mercedes. His wife was a schoolteacher and taught at W.H. Crogman Elementary School in Atlanta with Christine King Farris.

Handy died in Nashville, Tennessee on April 12, 1998.
