= D. Antoinette Handy =

American flautist and professor

- from a 1992 book
- Born: Dorothy Antoinette Handy; 1930; New Orleans, Louisiana, U.S.
- Died: 2002 (aged 71–72); Jackson, Mississippi
- Education: New England Conservatory of Music; Northwestern University; Conservatoire de Paris
- Occupations: flautist, academic, writer
- Spouse: Calvin Miller
- Children: 3
- Parent(s): William Talbot Handy; Dorothy Pauline Pleasant
- Relatives: Geneva Handy Southall (sister); W. T. Handy, Jr. (brother)

Dorothy Antoinette Handy-Miller (1930 – 2002) was an American flautist, music scholar, arts administrator, and writer. She was one of the first black members of the Richmond Symphony Orchestra, where she was a flautist from 1966 to 1976, and also performed with the Paris Orchestre International, the Civic Orchestra of Chicago, the New Orleans Philharmonic Orchestra, the Baltimore Symphony Orchestra, Symphony of the Air, and the Symphony of the New World. Handy was the Director of Music at the National Endowment of the Arts in Washington, D.C., establishing the National Jazz Service Organization and the National Jazz Network. She served on the faculty, as a professor of music, at the New York College of Music, Florida A&M University, Virginia State College, Virginia Union University, the Tuskegee Institute, and Jackson State University.

== Early life, family, and education ==
Handy was born in 1930 in New Orleans to Rev. William Talbot Handy and Dorothy Pauline Pleasant Handy. Her father was a Methodist minister and trained singer, and her mother was a music teacher. Her parents owned Handy Heights, a 116-acre farm in Hazlehurst, Mississippi. Handy was the sister of the pianist Geneva Handy Southall and the Methodist bishop W. T. Handy, Jr. She was the great-great-granddaughter of Mississippi Supreme Court justice and slaveowner Ephraim G. Peyton and of American Civil War veteran and Mississippi state legislator Emanuel Handy.

She began studying the flute as a child. She attended Spelman College before earning a bachelor's degree in 1952 from the New England Conservatory of Music and a master's degree in 1953 from Northwestern University's Bienen School of Music. She also earned an artist's diploma from the Conservatoire de Paris in 1955.

== Career ==
Handy performed with the New Orleans Philharmonic Orchestra while she was still a high school student. As a graduate student at Northwestern, she performed with the Civic Orchestra of Chicago. In 1954, she joined the Orchestre International in Paris. The following year, she joined the Music Viva Orchestra with her sister, Geneva Handy Southall, going on tour in Germany, which was sponsored by the United States Information Agency. Handy also performed with Arturo Toscanini's Symphony of the Air, the Orchestra at Radio City Music Hall, and the Orchestra of America. She was one of the first Black members of the Richmond Symphony Orchestra. She was a flautist with the Richmond Symphony Orchestra from 1966 until 1976, later forming the chamber group Trio Pro Viva with the cellist Ulysses Kirskey and the pianist Russel Wilson. Richmond Public Schools hired Handy as a jazz teacher. She presented three programs at the Smithsonian Institution and, from 1968 to 1971, was a member of the Symphony of the New World. She was also a soloist with the Baltimore Symphony Orchestra.

From 1966 to 1971, Handy served on the faculty as a music professor at Virginia State College. From 1979 to 1980, she served on the faculty as a music professor at Virginia Union University. She authored the biographical reference Black Women in American Bands and Orchestras and a profile on the influential female jazz group Darlings of Rhythm titled The International Sweethearts of Rhythm, as well Black Conductors and a biography of Ellis Marsalis titled Jazz Man's Journey.

She was named a Ford Foundation Fellow in 1971, researching black music in Durham and Chapel Hill, North Carolina.

In 1984, Handy moved to Washington, D.C. to work for the National Endowment for the Arts. Five years after joining the National Endowment, she became the director of its music program, supervising the federal agency's process for awarding grants to musical institutions, artists and performers, and composers. She particularly pushed for jazz musicians to receive recognition and financing and advocated for conservatories and music schools to admit more black students, establishing the National Jazz Service Organization and the National Jazz Network. She retired from the National Endowment in 1993 to join the faculty of Jackson State University in Mississippi.

She also taught music at Florida A&M University, New York College of Music, the Metropolitan Music School, the Tuskegee Institute, at the Harlem YMCA, and worked as a music therapist at the Alfred Alder Mental Hygiene Clinic and Music Rehabilitation Center.

Handy composed a few pieces, including five 'short impressions', publisher in 1998 by ClarNan, for solo flute.

== Personal life ==
Handy was married to Calvin Miller, a political science professor, and had three children. Handy died on October 21, 2002, from Parkinson's disease.
