= Geneva Handy Southall =

American musicologist (1925–2004)

- Dr. Geneva Handy Southall, from a 1994 newspaper
- Born: Frances Geneva Handy; December 5, 1925; New Orleans, Louisiana, US
- Died: January 2, 2004 (aged 78); Iowa City, Iowa, US
- Education: Dillard University (B.A.), Chicago Conservatory of Music (M.F.A.), University of Iowa (Ph.D.)
- Occupations: Musicologist, pianist, college professor
- Parent(s): William Talbot Handy; Dorothy Pauline Pleasant
- Relatives: D. Antoinette Handy (sister); W. T. Handy, Jr. (brother)

Frances Geneva Handy Southall (December 5, 1925 – January 2, 2004) was an American musicologist, pianist, and college professor.

== Early life and education ==
Frances Geneva Handy was born in New Orleans, Louisiana, the daughter of Rev. William Talbot Handy and Dorothy Pauline Pleasant Handy. Her father was a Methodist minister and a trained singer, and her mother was a music teacher. She was the great-great granddaughter of Mississippi Supreme Court justice Ephraim G. Peyton and of Mississippi state legislator Emanuel Handy. She graduated from Dillard University, majoring in music, in 1945, and was active in Delta Sigma Theta. In 1954, she began a master's program at the American Conservatory of Music in Chicago. In 1966, she became the first woman to earn a Ph.D. in piano performance, at the University of Iowa. Her dissertation was about composer John Field's piano concertos.

Her sister D. Antoinette Handy (1930–2002) was also a musician and music scholar. Her brother, W. T. Handy, Jr., was a United Methodist bishop.

== Career ==
After college, Handy taught briefly at the Gray Conservatory of Music in Los Angeles. While she was in graduate school, she taught at Paul Quinn College in Waco, Texas, Knoxville College in Tennessee, and South Carolina State College. She joined the faculty of Grambling College in 1966, and became a professor of music and African-American studies at the University of Minnesota in 1970. She chaired the African-American studies department. She retired from academic work in 1992. In 1995 she gave an oral history interview to the University of Minnesota. Southall's piano students included Ellis Marsalis Jr., whom she taught in New Orleans.

Southall wrote three books about Blind Tom Wiggins, a 19th-century disabled Black pianist: Blind Tom: the Post-Civil War Enslavement of a Black Musical Genius (1979), The Continuing Enslavement of Blind Tom: the Black Pianist-Composer (1983), and Blind Tom, the Black Pianist Composer: Continually Enslaved (1999).

Southall was one of the organizers of the Black Music Educators of the Twin Cities in 1974. Her work was recognized with awards from the National Association of Negro Musicians, the NAACP, and Dillard University, among other organizations. The library of the African American and African Studies department at the University of Minnesota is named for Southall. In 1992, Minnesota governor Arne Carlson declared a Geneva Southall Week, in recognition of her lifetime contributions.

== Personal life ==
Southall married twice. Her first husband was a World War II veteran, dentist Patrick Omille Rhone. They married in 1946, and had a daughter, Patricia Rhone (later Tisch Jones, a theatre artist and scholar). Patrick Rhone died in 1954. She was briefly married again, to a composer, Mitchell Southall (1922–1989); they divorced. Southall died after a stroke in 2004, in Iowa City, Iowa, aged 78 years. There is a large collection of Southall's papers at Emory University, and smaller collections of her papers in the Iowa Women's Archives, and at Columbus State University.
