= George Charles Sr. =

George W. Charles Sr. was a state legislator in Mississippi. He served in the Mississippi House of Representatives from Lawrence County, Mississippi, in 1870. He married and had two sons. His wife was named Julia and his sons were George W. Charles Jr. (1858–1926) and Arthur Charles.

He was born in Greene County, Alabama. In 1869 he succeeded Cuffy Chambers as the Republican Party candidate in Lawrence County.

Charles moved to Topeka, Kansas. He was a leader of a group in Topeka seeking to provide relief to desperate Topeka residents in 1885. George Charles, along with Charles Charles, was a leader of a colonization society group in Topeka supporting emigration to a nation for blacks in Africa. He or his namesake son was a colonization society member in 1885. In 1896 he was the leader of a group seeking pensions for people who had been enslaved.

Charles served in the Mississippi State Guard and as a prison inspector. He moved to Topeka in 1878 and was part of Charles Bros. grocery store business. George Charles Jr. had a cafe and confectionery on Kansas Avenue.

== See also ==
- Exoduster
- Emmanuel Handy
- John R. Lynch
