= William Talbot Handy =

American Methodist minister and civil rights activist

The Reverend William Talbot Handy
- Born: May 20, 1894; Copiah County, Mississippi, U.S.
- Died: February 1, 1983 (aged 88); New Orleans, Louisiana, U.S.
- Education: Tuskeegee Institute; New Orleans University; Gammon Theological Seminary
- Occupations: minister civil rights activist
- Spouse: Dorothy Pauline Pleasant
- Children: 4 (including William, Geneva, and Antoinette
- Relatives: Ephraim G. Peyton (great-grandfather); Emanuel Handy (great-grandfather)

William Talbot Handy, Sr. (May 20, 1894 – February 1, 1983) was an American Methodist minister and civil rights activist. He served as the district superintendent of the New Orleans District and as the superintendent of the Gulfside Assembly of the United Methodist Church. He was one of the organizers of the New Orleans Urban League and served as the first president of the Interdenominational Ministerial Alliance. He was a member of the 1939 Uniting Conference, when the Methodist Protestant Church, Southern Methodist Episcopal Church, and the Methodist Episcopal Church united to form the Methodist Church.

== Early life and family ==
Handy was born on May 20, 1894, in Copiah County, Mississippi as the eighth child of Emanuel Handy and Florence Geneva Handy. He was a great-grandson of the Mississippi Supreme Court justice and slaveowner Ephraim G. Peyton and of the American Civil War veteran and Mississippi state legislator Emanuel Handy. He grew up at Handy Heights, a farm in Hazlehurst, Mississippi that was given to his mother by her grandfather, Ephraim G. Peyton. His mother was the illegitimate daughter of Peyton's son, Ephraim Peyton Jr., and an enslaved woman named Isabella.

Handy received a formal education at local schools in Copiah County before enrolling at the Tuskegee Institute, where he was a choir member of the traveling quintet. While enrolled as a student, he sang at the funeral of Booker T. Washington on November 17, 1915, in the Tuskegee Institute Chapel. He earned a master's degree from New Orleans University and a theology degree from Gammon Theological Seminary.

== Ministry ==
In 1920, Handy was ordained as a deacon in the Atlanta Conference of the Methodist Church. In 1921, he began his ministry in Texas, followed by posts in the Southern California and West Texas Annual Conferences. Handy later served in the Louisiana Annual Conference as a minister at Peoples Church and Community Center, First Street Methodist Church, Trinity Methodist Church, Brooks Methodist Church, and Williams and Ray Avenue Church in New Orleans and Warren Methodist Church in Lake Charles, Louisiana. He served as pastor at Mount Zion United Methodist Church for nine years.

He was a member of the 1939 Uniting Conference, when the Methodist Protestant Church, Southern Methodist Episcopal Church, and the Methodist Episcopal Church united to form the Methodist Church. Handy served on the board for the church's General Commission on World Service and Finance. While working as a minister in New Orleans, Handy was instrumental in leading the Black community's involvement with the Community Chest (now United Way) and was one of the organizers of the New Orleans Urban League. He served as the first president of the Interdenominational Ministerial Alliance.

Handy was appointed as the district superintendent of the New Orleans District and, following his retirement from public ministry, was appointed as the Superintendent of Gulfside Assembly in Waveland, Mississippi.

== Personal life ==
In 1919, Handy married Dorothy Pauline Pleasant. They had four children: William Talbot Handy, Frances Geneva Handy, Ephriam Adair Handy, and Dorothy Antoinette Handy.

Handy died on February 1, 1983. His funeral was held on February 4, 1983, at Mount Zion United Methodist Church in New Orleans. The eulogy was delivered by Bishop J. Kenneth Shamblin.
