= Abingdon Press =

Publishing house of the United Methodist Church

- Parent company: United Methodist Publishing House
- Country of origin: United States
- Headquarters location: Nashville, Tennessee, US
- Imprints: Dimensions for Living; Kingswood Books
- Official website: www.abingdonpress.com

Abingdon Press is the book publishing arm of the United Methodist Publishing House which publishes sheet music, ministerial resources, Bible-study aids, and other items, often with a focus on Methodism and Methodists.

== History ==
Abingdon Press was begun in the early 1900s by the Methodist Church, with headquarters in New York City. The name of the imprint is a reference to the town of Abingdon, Maryland, location of the Methodist university Cokesbury College.

In 1923 the Methodist Episcopal Church, South adopted the name Cokesbury for its own publishing concern, with headquarters in Nashville, Tennessee. When the northern and southern branches of the Methodist Episcopal Church reunified in 1939, the name Abingdon-Cokesbury was chosen as the name of publishing house of the unitary Methodist Church and Nashville was chosen as the headquarters.

This name remained in use until 1954, when a return was made to the name Abingdon Press, with the church's retail division for its publishing enterprises assuming the name Cokesbury. In 1965 the joint Abingdon Press and the associated Cokesbury retail shops employed more than 2,000 people. In 1968, W. T. Handy, Jr. was hired as their first African-American executive.
