= Handy Man (disambiguation) =

A handyman is a person competent in a variety of trade skills.

Handy Man may also refer to:

== Films ==
- The Handy Man (1918 film), starring Oliver Hardy
- The Handyman (1920 film), written by Walter Forde
- The Handy Man (1923 film), starring Stan Laurel
- The Handyman (1980 film), a 1980 Canadian film
- The Handyman (2018 film), an Italian film directed by Valerio Attanasio starring Sergio Castellitto

== Songs ==
- "Handy Man" (song), a rock and roll song written by Jimmy Jones and Otis Blackwell
- " Handy Man", a song on the Magic of Love single, written and produced by Yasutaka Nakata and performed by the Japanese group Perfume
- "Handy-Man", a song on the Hannah med H Soundtrack by Swedish duo The Knife

== Other uses ==
- Homo habilis (lit. 'handy man'), the earliest known species of the genus Homo, and likely ancestor of modern humans
- ST Handyman, a British tug in service from 1947 until 1966
- "Handyman" (Peep Show), a television episode

== See also ==
- Handy Manny, a CGI-animated children's television series
- Handy (disambiguation)
- Hand (disambiguation)
- Man (disambiguation)
- Men (disambiguation)
