= Bartlett, Missouri =

Unincorporated community in Missouri, U.S.

Coordinates: 37°00′17″N 91°24′51″W

Bartlett is an unincorporated community in Shannon County, in the U.S. state of Missouri.

== History ==
A post office called Bartlett was established in 1888, and remained in operation until 1941. The community has the name of W. R. Bartlett, a railroad promoter.
