= E. M. Handy =

American football coach

Biographical details
- Born: January 15, 1904
- Died: January 17, 1975 (aged 71)

Coaching career (HC unless noted)
- 1927–1928: Apprentice

Head coaching record
- Overall: 5–9–1

Edward Malvern Handy (January 15, 1904 – January 17, 1975) was an American football coach. Handy was the fifth head football coach at The Apprentice School in Newport News, Virginia and he held that position for two seasons, from 1927 until 1928. His coaching record at Apprentice was 5–9–1.
