= Crider, Kentucky =

Unincorporated community in Kentucky, United States

Crider
- Unincorporated community
- Crider series
- Location within the state of Kentucky Crider (the United States)
- Coordinates: 37°9′26″N 87°58′28″W
- Country: United States
- State: Kentucky
- County: Caldwell
- Elevation: 469 ft (143 m)
- Time zone: UTC-6 (Central (CST))
  - Summer (DST): UTC-5 (CST)
- GNIS feature ID: 490341

Crider is an unincorporated community in Caldwell County, Kentucky, United States.

The community was named Crider in the 1830s, after the Crider clan of early settlers, originally from Virginia.

On May 26, 2024, an EF3 tornado hit the community directly.

A post office named Crider operated from 1888 to 1954.
