= Handy Andy =

Handy Andy may refer to:

- Handy Andy (1921 film), a British film directed by Bert Wynne
- Handy Andy (1934 film), a 1934 film starring Will Rogers
- Handy Andy (comic strip), a strip in the British comic Krazy
- Handy Andy, an 1841 book by Samuel Lover
- Handy Andy Home Improvement Center, a defunct big box hardware store
- Andy Kane, carpenter in the BBC DIY TV show Changing Rooms
- Andy Phillip (1922–2001), American basketball player
- Donald Neilson (1936–2011), English armed robber, kidnapper, and murderer
- A character in the Australian television series Fam Time
- Handy Andy grocery chain, purchased by the Texas-based grocery distributor Grocers Supply
- Handy Andy, a disinfectant and floor cleaner product; see Clorox § Brands
- Handy Andy, a 1983–1984 American child pornography magazine published by John David Norman
