= Barnsley, Kentucky =

Unincorporated community in Kentucky, United States

Coordinates: 37°15′25″N 87°29′23″W

Barnsley is an unincorporated community in Hopkins County, in the U.S. state of Kentucky.

== History ==
Barnsley had its start in 1886 as a mining community. A post office was established at Barnsley in 1888, and remained in operation until 1928.

On December 10, 2021, a violent tornado tore through Barnsley, destroying 25 to 30 homes.

Less than 3 years later, another strong tornado impacted Barnsley. This tornado was rated EF3.
