= Handy, Georgia =

- Unincorporated community
- Location within Georgia
- Coordinates: 33°22′35″N 84°58′09″W
- Country: United States
- State: Georgia
- County: Coweta
- Elevation: 850 ft (260 m)
- Time zone: UTC-5 (Eastern (EST))
  - Summer (DST): UTC-4 (EDT)
- Area codes: 770, 678 & 470
- GNIS feature ID: 331904

Handy is an unincorporated community in Coweta County, Georgia, United States, located 9.8 miles (15.8 km) west of Newnan.
