= Arkana, Baxter County, Arkansas =

Arkana, Arkansas
- Unincorporated community
- Arkana's position in Arkansas. Arkana, Arkansas (the United States)
- Coordinates: 36°14′18″N 92°19′00″W
- Country: United States
- State: Arkansas
- County: Baxter
- Township: Buckhorn
- Elevation: 741 ft (226 m)
- Time zone: UTC-6 (Central (CST))
  - Summer (DST): UTC-5 (CDT)
- GNIS feature ID: 70461

Arkana is an unincorporated community in Baxter County, Arkansas, United States. The community is located along Arkansas Highway 201.

The rural crossroads was initially known as Gobbler's Flat from an abundance of wild turkey. It was home to a large general store and post office that served the local population. The Arkana school once had the largest enrollment in Baxter County.
