= Justice, Oklahoma =

- Census Designated Place
- Interactive map of Justice, Oklahoma
- Coordinates: 36°17′27″N 95°33′49″W
- Country: United States
- State: Oklahoma
- County: Rogers
- Elevation: 646 ft (197 m)

Population (2000)
  - Total: 1,311
- GNIS feature ID: 2408457

Justice is a census-designated place (CDP) in Rogers County, Oklahoma, United States. As of the 2020 census, Justice had a population of 1,424.

== Geography ==
According to the United States Census Bureau, the CDP has a total area of 9.0 square miles (23 km^{2}), all land.

== Demographics ==
=== 2020 census ===
As of the 2020 census, Justice had a population of 1,424. The median age was 49.2 years. 20.9% of residents were under the age of 18 and 23.5% of residents were 65 years of age or older. For every 100 females there were 98.3 males, and for every 100 females age 18 and over there were 91.7 males age 18 and over.

0.0% of residents lived in urban areas, while 100.0% lived in rural areas.

There were 526 households in Justice, of which 27.9% had children under the age of 18 living in them. Of all households, 72.2% were married-couple households, 11.0% were households with a male householder and no spouse or partner present, and 12.7% were households with a female householder and no spouse or partner present. About 16.0% of all households were made up of individuals and 9.1% had someone living alone who was 65 years of age or older.

There were 566 housing units, of which 7.1% were vacant. The homeowner vacancy rate was 2.2% and the rental vacancy rate was 0.0%.

Racial composition as of the 2020 census
Race	Number	Percent
White	1,031	72.4%
Black or African American	7	0.5%
American Indian and Alaska Native	141	9.9%
Asian	8	0.6%
Native Hawaiian and Other Pacific Islander	0	0.0%
Some other race	14	1.0%
Two or more races	223	15.7%
Hispanic or Latino (of any race)	41	2.9%

=== 2000 census ===
As of the census of 2000, there were 1,311 people, 460 households, and 386 families residing in the CDP. The population density was 146.4 inhabitants per square mile (56.5/km^{2}). There were 480 housing units at an average density of 53.6 per square mile (20.7/km^{2}). The racial makeup of the CDP was 81.39% White, 0.38% African American, 12.05% Native American, 0.15% Asian, 0.08% from other races, and 5.95% from two or more races. Hispanic or Latino of any race were 0.69% of the population.

There were 460 households, out of which 37.0% had children under the age of 18 living with them, 75.7% were married couples living together, 6.5% had a female householder with no husband present, and 15.9% were non-families. 13.0% of all households were made up of individuals, and 5.2% had someone living alone who was 65 years of age or older. The average household size was 2.76 and the average family size was 3.00.

In the CDP, the population was spread out, with 25.7% under the age of 18, 5.9% from 18 to 24, 27.1% from 25 to 44, 29.3% from 45 to 64, and 12.1% who were 65 years of age or older. The median age was 40 years. For every 100 females there were 98.3 males. For every 100 females age 18 and over, there were 96.4 males.

The median income for a household in the CDP was $47,500, and the median income for a family was $51,618. Males had a median income of $41,429 versus $25,156 for females. The per capita income for the CDP was $20,909. About 6.2% of families and 8.8% of the population were below the poverty line, including 2.4% of those under age 18 and 5.4% of those age 65 or over.
