= Valley Park, Oklahoma =

- Town
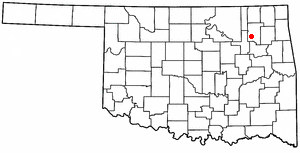
- Location of Valley Park, Oklahoma
- Coordinates: 36°16′58″N 95°44′10″W
- Country: United States
- State: Oklahoma
- County: Rogers

Area
  - Total: 2.17 sq mi (5.61 km^{2})
  - Land: 2.15 sq mi (5.58 km^{2})
  - Water: 0.012 sq mi (0.03 km^{2})
- Elevation: 692 ft (211 m)

Population (2020)
  - Total: 19
  - Density: 8.8/sq mi (3.41/km^{2})
- Time zone: UTC-6 (Central (CST))
  - Summer (DST): UTC-5 (CDT)
- FIPS code: 40-76600
- GNIS feature ID: 2413419

Valley Park is a town in Rogers County, Oklahoma, United States. As of the 2020 census, Valley Park had a population of 19.

== Geography ==
According to the United States Census Bureau, the town has a total area of 2.2 square miles (5.7 km^{2}), of which 2.2 square miles (5.7 km^{2}) is land and 0.46% is water.

== Demographics ==
Historical population
Census	Pop.	Note	%±
1980	16		—
1990	1		−93.7%
2000	24		2,300.0%
2010	77		220.8%
2020	19		−75.3%
U.S. Decennial Census

=== 2020 census ===
As of the 2020 census, Valley Park had a population of 19. The median age was 39.8 years. 0.0% of residents were under the age of 18 and 15.8% of residents were 65 years of age or older. For every 100 females there were 90.0 males, and for every 100 females age 18 and over there were 90.0 males age 18 and over.

0.0% of residents lived in urban areas, while 100.0% lived in rural areas.

There were 8 households in Valley Park, of which 62.5% had children under the age of 18 living in them. Of all households, 50.0% were married-couple households, 12.5% were households with a male householder and no spouse or partner present, and 12.5% were households with a female householder and no spouse or partner present. About 0.0% of all households were made up of individuals and 0.0% had someone living alone who was 65 years of age or older.

There were 8 housing units, of which 0.0% were vacant. The homeowner vacancy rate was 0.0% and the rental vacancy rate was 0.0%.

Racial composition as of the 2020 census
Race	Number	Percent
White	14	73.7%
Black or African American	1	5.3%
American Indian and Alaska Native	2	10.5%
Asian	0	0.0%
Native Hawaiian and Other Pacific Islander	1	5.3%
Some other race	0	0.0%
Two or more races	1	5.3%
Hispanic or Latino (of any race)	0	0.0%

=== 2000 census ===
As of the census of 2000, there were 24 people, 6 households, and 6 families residing in the town. The population density was 11.0 people per square mile (4.3/km^{2}). There were 8 housing units at an average density of 3.7 per square mile (1.4/km^{2}). The racial makeup of the town was 91.67% White, and 8.33% from two or more races.

There were 6 households, out of which 66.7% had children under the age of 18 living with them, 66.7% were married couples living together, 33.3% had a female householder with no husband present, and 0.0% were non-families. No households were made up of individuals, and none had someone living alone who was 65 years of age or older. The average household size was 4.00 and the average family size was 4.00.

In the town, the population was spread out, with 45.8% under the age of 18, 8.3% from 18 to 24, 33.3% from 25 to 44, 4.2% from 45 to 64, and 8.3% who were 65 years of age or older. The median age was 20 years. For every 100 females, there were 60.0 males. For every 100 females age 18 and over, there were 62.5 males.

The median income for a household in the town was $101,376, and the median income for a family was $101,376. Males had a median income of $0 versus $0 for females. The per capita income for the town was $25,280. There are 25.0% of families living below the poverty line and 30.0% of the population, including no under eighteens and 100.0% of those over 64.
