= Ephraim G. Peyton =

American judge (1802–1976)

Justice of the Mississippi Supreme Court
- In office 1870–1876
- Succeeded by: Hamilton Henderson Chalmers

Justice of the Mississippi High Court of Errors and Appeals
- In office 1868–1870

Member of the Mississippi House of Representatives
- In office 1830–1831

Personal details
- Born: October 29, 1802 Hardin County, Kentucky, U.S.
- Died: September 5, 1876 (aged 73) Jackson, Mississippi
- Party: Whig (previously); Republican
- Spouse: Artemissa G. Patton
- Occupation: lawyer public official judge businessman

Ephraim Geoffrey Peyton (October 29, 1802 – September 5, 1876) was an American jurist, lawyer, and politician. He was judge of the High Court of Errors and Appeals of Mississippi from 1868 to 1870 and a justice of its successor, the Mississippi Supreme Court, from 1870 to 1876 including as chief justice.

== Biography ==
Peyton was born near Elizabethtown, Kentucky, on October 29, 1802, to Ephraim Peyton and Lockhart Eagan. His ancestors were from Virginia. He was sent to college at Gallatin, Tennessee, but left school at age 17 and in 1819 moved to Natchez, Mississippi with an older brother. There he obtained employment as a printer and later secured a small school in the forests of Wilkinson County, where he began and prosecuted the study of law. In 1825 he obtained his license from the supreme court at Natchez. He filled his saddlebags with law books and went into the interior to practice, locating at Gallatin, Mississippi (which had been settled by pioneers from Gallatin, Tennessee) in Copiah County, Mississippi. Peyton was a slave owner.

He established a large mercantile house at Grand Gulf, Mississippi. In 1830, he served one session in the Mississippi House of Representatives, and then persistently refused to compete for any political office. In 1831, he married Artemissa G. Patton in Claiborne County.

In 1839 he was elected district attorney. He was a zealous Whig in politics and earnestly opposed secession. He became a Republican after the American Civil War and was appointed to Mississippi's supreme court by General Adelbert Ames, and upon the reorganization of the court under the constitution of 1869, was again appointed by Governor James L. Alcorn. In 1870 he became chief justice, and held the position until the Democrats came into power at the end of the Reconstruction era in 1876. He was an accomplished lawyer and an able and impartial jurist and enjoyed the respect and esteem of the profession to the end, regardless of party fealty.

On February 25, 1868, General Alvan Cullem Gillem, who had been given post-Civil War command over a region including Mississippi, named Peyton to the state supreme court, along with Elza Jeffords and Thomas Shackelford. Peyton resigned in 1876. He died in Jackson, Mississippi, on September 5, 1876.

Political offices
Preceded by Newly constituted court	Justice of the Supreme Court of Mississippi; 1868–1876	Succeeded by H. H. Chalmers
