= Emanuel Handy =

American politician

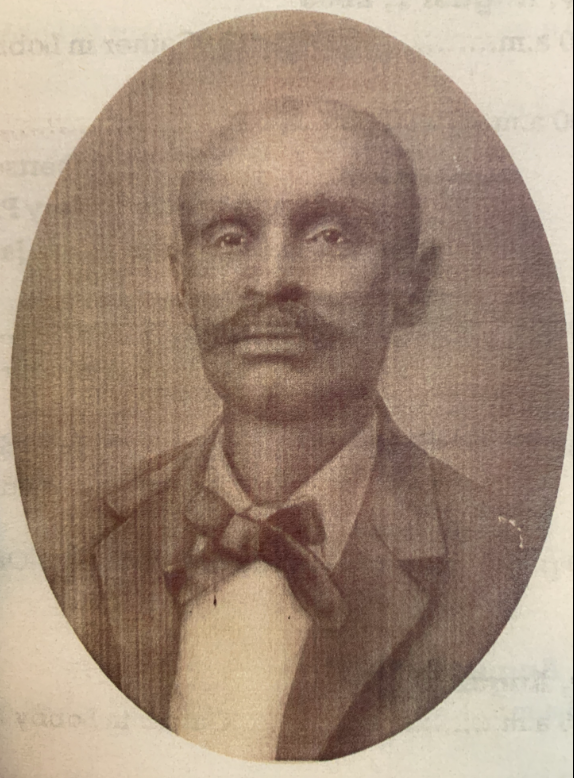

Member of the Mississippi House of Representatives
- In office 1870–1873

Personal details
- Born: December 25, 1839 Copiah County, Mississippi, U.S.
- Died: December 8, 1922 (aged 82) Atchison, Kansas, U.S.
- Resting place: Oak Hill Cemetery
- Occupation: politician, farmer, constable

Military service
- Allegiance: United States
- Branch/service: United States Army
- Years of service: 1863–1866
- Rank: Second sergeant
- Commands: 82nd Regiment, U.S. Colored Infantry
- Battles/wars: American Civil War

Emanuel Handy (December 25, 1839 – December 8, 1922), sometimes recorded as Emmanuel Handy, was an American soldier, constable, farmer, and politician. He served in the Union Army during the American Civil War. He became involved in politics during the Reconstruction Era, serving as a delegate at the 1868 Mississippi Constitutional Convention and sitting in the Mississippi House of Representatives from 1870 to 1874.

== Biography ==
Handy was born in Copiah County, Mississippi.

He served in the Union Army during the American Civil War as a second sergeant in the 82nd Regiment of the U.S. Colored Troops. He was a delegate to Mississippi's 1868 Constitutional Convention, a farmer, a constable, and a state legislator in Mississippi. At the constitutional convention, Handy proposed a requirement for electors to have an "acceptance of the civil and political equality of all men." He was elected to the Mississippi House of Representatives, serving in office from 1870 to 1873.

Handy moved to Topeka, Kansas and was a member of St. John African Methodist Episcopal Church. He later moved to Atchison, Kansas, where he joined the Grand Army of the Republic. and attended Campbell Chapel A.M.E. Church.

He died in Atchison on December 8, 1922, aged 85. One of fellow African American Mississippi state legislator George Charles Sr.'s sons, Arthur Charles, attended his funeral. The funeral was officiated by Rev. Tucker of Campbell Chapel, and veterans of the First World War served as escorts.

== See also ==
- African American officeholders from the end of the Civil War until before 1900
