= List of tornadoes in the outbreak of May 6–10, 2024 =

From May 6–10, 2024, a large and damaging tornado outbreak occurred across the Central and Southern United States.

== Confirmed tornadoes ==
Daily statistics
Date	Total	EFU	EF0	EF1	EF2	EF3	EF4	EF5	Deaths	Injuries
May 6	33	5	15	12	0	0	1	0	2	33
May 7	59	3	24	26	6	0	0	0	0	17
May 8	55	5	16	28	3	3	0	0	1	22
May 9	20	0	8	12	0	0	0	0	0	0
May 10	13	4	3	2	4	0	0	0	2	0
Total	180	17	66	80	13	3	1	0	5	72

=== May 6 event ===
List of confirmed tornadoes – Monday, May 6, 2024 (Note: All dates are based on the local time zone where the tornado touched down; however, all times are in Coordinated Universal Time for consistency.)
EF#	Location	County / Parish	State	Start Coord.	Time (UTC)	Path length	Max width
EF0	N of Wellfleet	Lincoln	NE	40.88°N 100.7°W	16:53–17:02	0.87 mi (1.40 km)	10 yd (9.1 m)
EF0	A landspout caused minor tree damage over open country.						
EFU	SW of Mud Butte	Butte	SD	44.8786°N 103.0536°W	18:49–18:53	3.45 mi (5.55 km)	10 yd (9.1 m)
EFU	A tornado occurred in a highly rural area, precluding a damage survey.						
EFU	WSW of Mud Butte	Butte	SD	44.9596°N 103.0919°W	19:07–19:31	10.5 mi (16.9 km)	10 yd (9.1 m)
EFU	A tornado occurred in a highly rural area, precluding a damage survey.						
EF0	SE of Taylorsville	Wilson	TN	36.2551°N 86.1835°W	19:55–19:56	0.51 mi (0.82 km)	50 yd (46 m)
EF0	A brief tornado downed a few trees.						
EF0	SE of Cowles	Webster	NE	40.1451°N 98.3966°W	21:19–21:29	7 mi (11 km)	40 yd (37 m)
EF0	A likely rain-wrapped tornado damaged outbuildings, inflicted minor tree damage, and overturned a camper.						
EF1	Smithville	DeKalb	TN	35.9719°N 85.8700°W	21:21–21:33	3.23 mi (5.20 km)	150 yd (140 m)
EF1	A tornado began on the west side of Smithville, moving along SR 83 north of town, where numerous trees were downed, several homes sustained roof damage, and several barns and outbuildings were damaged or destroyed. The tornado reached its peak intensity of EF1 along SR 56 on the north side of downtown, where a home sustained partial roof loss and structural damage, a barn was damaged, numerous trees were downed, and a power pole was broken.						
EFU	NW of Arnold	Custer	NE	41.47°N 100.25°W	21:40	0.1 mi (0.16 km)	1 yd (0.91 m)
EFU	A landspout was recorded and photographed over open country.						
EFU	NW of Ringwood to SSE of Helena	Major, Alfalfa	OK	36.459°N 98.317°W	23:04–23:11	3.81 mi (6.13 km)	30 yd (27 m)
EFU	A rain-wrapped tornado was reported by a storm spotter.						
EF1	SSE of Okeene to W of Hennessey	Blaine, Kingfisher	OK	36.058°N 98.284°W	23:41–00:02	11.08 mi (17.83 km)	300 yd (270 m)
EF1	Three outbuildings had their roofs significantly damaged. Power poles and trees were damaged or snapped as well.						
EF0	N of Krider	Gage	NE	40.1376°N 96.7496°W	00:07–00:08	0.99 mi (1.59 km)	30 yd (27 m)
EF0	A brief tornado damaged a supply building on US 77.						
EF0	NE of Beatrice	Gage	NE	40.321°N 96.692°W	00:16–00:17	0.22 mi (0.35 km)	20 yd (18 m)
EF0	A cattle shed, a barn, and a home's covered porch were damaged.						
EF0	S of Bison	Garfield	OK	36.174°N 97.89°W	00:27	0.2 mi (0.32 km)	50 yd (46 m)
EF0	Sign posts were damaged.						
EF0	ESE of Bison	Garfield	OK	36.174°N 97.804°W	00:34	0.2 mi (0.32 km)	30 yd (27 m)
EF0	An outbuilding was damaged.						
EF0	S of Manhattan	Riley	KS	39.14°N 96.58°W	00:39–00:44	1.18 mi (1.90 km)	75 yd (69 m)
EF0	A small tornado damaged trees and overturned an irrigation pivot.						
EF1	Douglas to S of Covington	Garfield	OK	36.261°N 97.675°W	00:44–00:54	6.26 mi (10.07 km)	300 yd (270 m)
EF1	This tornado damaged at least two outbuildings, power poles and trees.						
EF0	E of Ponca City	Kay	OK	36.713°N 97.034°W	01:44–01:45	0.72 mi (1.16 km)	30 yd (27 m)
EF0	Trees and homes were damaged along the southwest side of Lake Ponca.						
EF1	SSE of Glenwood	Mills	IA	40.99°N 95.706°W	01:48–01:55	5.66 mi (9.11 km)	250 yd (230 m)
EF1	A fast-moving tornado severely impacted a farm, destroying a large shed and scattering debris from two grain bins 0.5 mi (0.80 km) downwind. Two other farmsteads sustained high-end EF1 damage. Numerous trees and large tree branches were snapped.						
EF1	N of Kaw City	Kay	OK	36.782°N 96.924°W	01:54–02:03	8 mi (13 km)	75 yd (69 m)
EF1	Trees and a boat dock were damaged. A camper was overturned. The tornado likely dissipated as a waterspout over Kaw Lake.						
EFU	W of Elgin	Chautauqua	KS	36.9998°N 96.4138°W	01:55–01:57	0.01 mi (0.016 km)	10 yd (9.1 m)
EFU	This tornado was reported via social media just north of the Oklahoma state line.						
EF1	W of Macedonia	Pottawattamie	IA	41.203°N 95.499°W	02:07–02:09	1.53 mi (2.46 km)	200 yd (180 m)
EF1	The tornado inflicted shingle damage on a home and snapped trees.						
EF4	ENE of Osage to Barnsdall to eastern Bartlesville	Osage, Washington	OK	36.3304°N 96.3559°W	02:12–03:07	40.8 mi (65.7 km)	1,700 yd (1,600 m)
EF4	2 deaths – See article on this tornado – 33 people were injured.						
EF1	ESE of Minden to WSW of Shelby	Pottawattamie, Shelby	IA	41.463°N 95.525°W	02:13–02:19	3.98 mi (6.41 km)	450 yd (410 m)
EF1	A transmission line was damaged where the tornado initially touched down. Several outbuildings and trees were damaged along the tornado path before the tornado lifted west of Shelby.						
EF0	S of Burlington	Coffey	KS	38.12°N 95.75°W	02:22–02:23	0.86 mi (1.38 km)	50 yd (46 m)
EF0	Emergency management reported minor damage.						
EF0	ESE of Sharpe	Coffey	KS	38.24°N 95.59°W	02:30–02:35	2.2 mi (3.5 km)	30 yd (27 m)
EF0	A weak tornado damaged trees and a barn.						
EF0	SSE of Carney	Lincoln	OK	35.767°N 97.016°W	03:56–04:01	2.2 mi (3.5 km)	50 yd (46 m)
EF0	A tornado debris signature was observed on radar but no damage was found.						
EF0	NE of Hoover to ESE of Ridgely	Platte, Clay	MO	39.3769°N 94.6713°W	03:59–04:06	5.99 mi (9.64 km)	50 yd (46 m)
EF0	Damage was primarily limited to trees.						

=== May 7 event ===
List of confirmed tornadoes – Tuesday, May 7, 2024
EF#	Location	County / Parish	State	Start Coord.	Time (UTC)	Path length	Max width
EF0	WNW of Picher, OK to ENE of Columbus, KS	Ottawa (OK), Cherokee (KS)	OK, KS	36.9686°N 95.0005°W	04:00–04:24	24.09 mi (38.77 km)	1,100 yd (1,000 m)
EF0	Numerous trees were snapped or uprooted and multiple barns were damaged.						
EF0	NE of Sherwin	Cherokee	KS	37.21°N 94.8974°W	04:13–04:15	2.67 mi (4.30 km)	50 yd (46 m)
EF0	Several outbuildings were destroyed, barns were damaged and trees were downed.						
EF1	Southern Blue Springs to Grain Valley	Jackson	MO	39.9674°N 94.2673°W	04:26–04:35	5.83 mi (9.38 km)	50 yd (46 m)
EF1	This tornado touched down in the southern portion of Blue Springs, destroying a gazebo. The tornado tracked northeast damaging several commercial buildings in both Blue Springs and Grain Valley. As the tornado crossed I-70, a semi-truck was knocked over and two RV trailers from a nearby dealership were tossed into a ditch.						
EF1	Joplin to Duquesne	Jasper	MO	37.06°N 94.51°W	04:29–04:34	4.49 mi (7.23 km)	100 yd (91 m)
EF1	The tornado caused intermittent damage across southern portions of Joplin, uprooting trees and stripping shingles from homes. Flying debris resulted in additional roof damage.						
EF1	Southern Oklahoma City	Oklahoma	OK	35.378°N 97.543°W	04:39–04:42	2.2 mi (3.5 km)	75 yd (69 m)
EF1	This tornado touched down east of Will Rogers World Airport, dealing roof damage to a few apartment buildings. Some businesses were damaged and tree was damage was also noted.						
EF1	W of Carthage	Jasper	MO	37.155°N 94.3751°W	04:38–04:39	2.03 mi (3.27 km)	100 yd (91 m)
EF1	The tornado uprooted many trees and blew down power lines. Several roofs were also damaged.						
EF1	Southern Oklahoma City to Del City	Oklahoma	OK	35.427°N 97.463°W	04:46–04:47	1.1 mi (1.8 km)	30 yd (27 m)
EF1	A storage facility and the roofs of a few homes were damaged.						
EF1	SE of Slick to WSW of Beggs	Creek, Okmulgee	OK	35.698°N 96.213°W	05:06–05:13	4 mi (6.4 km)	350 yd (320 m)
EF1	Multiple trees were uprooted and large tree limbs were snapped.						
EF0	NE of Greenfield	Dade	MO	37.437°N 93.761°W	05:12–05:14	0.44 mi (0.71 km)	200 yd (180 m)
EF0	This brief tornado uprooted several trees.						
EF0	S of Lowry City	St. Clair	MO	38.1025°N 93.7422°W	05:21–05:25	1 mi (1.6 km)	100 yd (91 m)
EF0	Trees were damaged.						
EF0	S of Cave Spring to W of Olive	Greene, Polk, Dallas	MO	37.3217°N 93.465°W	05:33–05:55	18.69 mi (30.08 km)	150 yd (140 m)
EF0	This tornado uprooted trees along its path. Two homes were damaged by windthrown trees, resulting in one injury.						
EF1	N of Lacelle to ESE of Osceola	Clarke	IA	40.9694°N 93.8474°W	05:38–05:46	6.16 mi (9.91 km)	80 yd (73 m)
EF1	This tornado initially damaged an outbuilding at a farmstead before uprooting several trees south of Osceola. One house also had portions of its roof removed.						
EF0	S of Levasy to Napoleon	Jackson, Lafayette	MO	39.0772°N 94.1199°W	05:39–05:45	4.43 mi (7.13 km)	50 yd (46 m)
EF0	Several trees were snapped or uprooted. Utility wires and an outbuilding were damaged.						
EF0	Woodburn	Clarke	IA	41.0079°N 93.6118°W	05:53–05:56	2.01 mi (3.23 km)	80 yd (73 m)
EF0	This tornado began southwest of town, causing some damage to trees. The tornado then entered town, where it collapsed the wall of a commercial building and caused minor damage to a home. Trees and powerlines were also damaged throughout town. Exiting the town, the tornado damaged an outbuilding and tree limbs at a farmstead before lifting.						
EF1	NE of Weleetka	Okfuskee	OK	35.3714°N 96.1295°W	06:05–06:11	2.8 mi (4.5 km)	200 yd (180 m)
EF1	A tornado uprooted trees, snapped large tree limbs and damaged outbuildings.						
EF0	SE of Ackworth	Warren	IA	41.3476°N 93.4862°W	06:12–06:16	3.12 mi (5.02 km)	80 yd (73 m)
EF0	An outbuilding and a couple trees were damaged.						
EF0	Prairie City	Jasper	IA	41.5984°N 93.2308°W	06:35–06:36	0.14 mi (0.23 km)	30 yd (27 m)
EF0	This brief tornado minorly damaged a few garages. Tree damage also occurred.						
EF0	SSE of Knoxville to WSW of Harvey	Marion	IA	41.255°N 93.0637°W	06:37–06:43	4.96 mi (7.98 km)	80 yd (73 m)
EF0	A tornado passed through a few farmsteads, mainly damaging trees.						
EF1	E of LaMonte to NNE of Beaman	Pettis	MO	38.73°N 93.3°W	06:51–07:05	9.74 mi (15.68 km)	75 yd (69 m)
EF1	This tornado damaged trees and a home.						
EF2	SSE of Stilwell, OK to E of Odell, AR	Adair (OK), Washington (AR)	OK, AR	35.7363°N 94.5946°W	07:23–07:39	11.7 mi (18.8 km)	800 yd (730 m)
EF2	Outbuildings were destroyed and numerous trees were snapped or uprooted.						
EF0	SW of Franks to ENE of Dixon	Pulaski, Phelps, Maries	MO	37.91°N 92.12°W	07:28–07:38	9.83 mi (15.82 km)	150 yd (140 m)
EF0	An intermittent tornado uprooted several trees and snapped large tree limbs.						
EF1	NNE of Rudy to SE of Mountainburg	Crawford	AR	35.5855°N 94.2375°W	07:43–07:50	5.7 mi (9.2 km)	900 yd (820 m)
EF1	An outbuilding was destroyed and trees were snapped or uprooted.						
EF1	ENE of Mount Airy to western Moberly	Randolph	MO	39.39°N 92.6°W	07:43–07:56	8.27 mi (13.31 km)	250 yd (230 m)
EF1	Outside Moberly, multiple trees were uprooted and minor roof damage occurred. A water tank was also destroyed. Once in Moberly, the tornado snapped power poles, downed power lines, and produced considerable tree damage. Some trees were uprooted and fell on property, damaging vehicles, shingles, and breaking windows.						
EF1	Northeastern Van Buren to SSW of Dyer	Crawford	AR	35.4544°N 94.3168°W	07:43–07:53	9.2 mi (14.8 km)	1,100 yd (1,000 m)
EF1	A high-end EF1 damaged homes and snapped or uprooted numerous trees.						
EF0	Southern Higbee	Randolph	MO	39.3°N 92.52°W	07:44–07:47	2.25 mi (3.62 km)	400 yd (370 m)
EF0	An EF0 tornado damaged a large section of the southern part of Higbee. Most of the damage was to trees. A car was displaced a couple feet in the parking lot and a trailer was blown into a business property. As the tornado moved along Route A, multiple large trees were blown down and smaller trees were uprooted. Some trees fell on property, damaging vehicles and several residences.						
EF1	NW of Graphic	Crawford	AR	35.5899°N 94.1852°W	07:48–07:49	0.6 mi (0.97 km)	100 yd (91 m)
EF1	A couple trees were uprooted and some of those trees fell on homes. Large tree limbs were also snapped.						
EF1	N of Blackburn	Washington	AR	35.8397°N 94.2257°W	07:55–07:58	1.8 mi (2.9 km)	150 yd (140 m)
EF1	A tornado destroyed an outbuilding and uprooted trees.						
EF1	E of Mountainburg	Franklin	AR	35.64°N 94.0532°W	07:55–08:00	3.9 mi (6.3 km)	1,200 yd (1,100 m)
EF1	A large tornado snapped and uprooted numerous trees. A few outbuildings were also damaged.						
EF1	SE of Hazel Valley to S of Crosses	Washington, Madison	AR	35.8396°N 93.9612°W	08:08–08:13	2.8 mi (4.5 km)	550 yd (500 m)
EF1	Numerous trees were snapped or uprooted.						
EF0	NNW of Hinch	Crawford	MO	38.105°N 91.195°W	08:44–08:45	0.72 mi (1.16 km)	75 yd (69 m)
EF0	A weak tornado uprooted trees and snapped large tree limbs.						
EF1	Eastern Sullivan	Franklin	MO	38.217°N 91.137°W	08:45–08:46	0.31 mi (0.50 km)	150 yd (140 m)
EF1	This very brief tornado snapped or uprooted trees, damaged businesses and homes, and lofted debris into trees.						
EF0	N of Defiance	St. Charles	MO	38.665°N 90.812°W	09:21–09:22	2.23 mi (3.59 km)	50 yd (46 m)
EF0	A very weak tornado snapped large tree limbs and uprooted trees.						
EF0	SSW of Blaine, IL to SE of Fontana-on-Geneva Lake, WI	Boone (IL), McHenry (IL), Walworth (WI)	IL, WI	42.4401°N 88.8039°W	19:05–19:25	14.33 mi (23.06 km)	50 yd (46 m)
EF0	A barn collapsed and a shed was lofted and destroyed.						
EF1	SSW of Darien	Walworth	WI	42.5814°N 88.7242°W	19:18–19:21	0.98 mi (1.58 km)	50 yd (46 m)
EF1	A horse stable was damaged.						
EF1	Northwestern Dowagiac to SE of Decatur	Cass	MI	41.995°N 86.1227°W	21:11–21:38	11.71 mi (18.85 km)	950 yd (870 m)
EF1	This large tornado first touched down north of the Dowagiac Municipal Airport and moved northeastward, damaging trees, including a few large trees that were uprooted and fell onto homes. The tornado then snapped a power pole and flipped a few center pivots into a field adjacent to Amtrak's Michigan Line. After crossing the railroad, the tornado reached its peak width and snapped hundreds of trees in the Twin Lakes area. The tornado continued to snap trees and damaged a barn before dissipating at the Cass/Van Buren County line.						
EF2	Southern Centreville to NE of Sherwood	St. Joseph, Branch	MI	41.9132°N 85.5258°W	21:41–22:11	19.53 mi (31.43 km)	1,200 yd (1,100 m)
EF2	This large, strong high-end EF2 tornado caused extensive damage to trees, center pivot irrigation systems, and homes. The peak damage occurred between Colon and Sherwood where several homes suffered loss of roof and walls. Outbuildings were severely damaged or destroyed as well. A tornado emergency was issued for this tornado, the first time such an alert had ever been issued in Michigan.						
EF2	Portage	Kalamazoo	MI	42.19°N 85.67°W	21:55–22:17	10.86 mi (17.48 km)	300 yd (270 m)
EF2	Many homes had roof and/or siding damage by this strong high-end EF2 tornado. Two mobile home parks were hit with several mobile homes being destroyed. Businesses and apartments were damaged and the left middle section of the roof of a FedEx warehouse collapsed as well. Sixteen people were injured.						
EF1	SSW of Union City	Branch	MI	42.0248°N 85.1797°W	22:07–22:08	1.09 mi (1.75 km)	100 yd (91 m)
EF1	This satellite tornado to the Sherwood EF2 tornado destroyed an outbuilding. Strong RFD winds occurred between the two tornado paths.						
EFU	WNW of Angola	Steuben	IN	41.6573°N 85.0702°W	22:11–22:12	0.05 mi (0.080 km)	1 yd (0.91 m)
EFU	A brief tornado touched down over an open field, causing no damage.						
EFU	NE of Richland, Rush County, Indiana	Rush	IN	39.5133°N 85.3875°W	23:47–23:53	0.77 mi (1.24 km)	30 yd (27 m)
EFU	A tornado was recorded by a nearby resident and caused small swirls in a soybean field.						
EF2	NNW of Fort Recovery to E of Erastus	Mercer	OH	40.4646°N 84.7917°W	23:50–00:08	8.14 mi (13.10 km)	400 yd (370 m)
EF2	A strong tornado severely damaged or destroyed several large outbuildings. A few homes sustained significant roof damage while a few others sustained more minor damage. Numerous trees were snapped or uprooted.						
EF0	NE of Middletown	Shelby	IN	39.4703°N 85.6448°W	00:02–00:03	0.78 mi (1.26 km)	50 yd (46 m)
EF0	Numerous trees were snapped or uprooted. Nearby homes suffered minor loss of shingles or gutters. A very old barn sustained some roof damage.						
EF1	N of St. Paul to SSE of Moscow	Rush	IN	39.4621°N 85.629°W	00:03–00:15	4.63 mi (7.45 km)	75 yd (69 m)
EF1	A brief tornado caused damage to a metal barn.						
EF1	WSW of Moscow	Rush	IN	39.4699°N 85.5851°W	00:05–00:06	0.16 mi (0.26 km)	30 yd (27 m)
EF1	Several trees were snapped and one barn had part of its metal roofing peeled back and tossed.						
EF1	Western Milton	Fayette, Wayne	IN	39.772°N 85.2022°W	00:08–00:13	2.92 mi (4.70 km)	150 yd (140 m)
EF1	Numerous trees were snapped or uprooted.						
EF1	E of Broughton to southern Melrose	Paulding	OH	41.0803°N 84.5152°W	00:09–00:14	6.16 mi (9.91 km)	300 yd (270 m)
EF1	The most intense damage occurred as this tornado touched down, sliding an unanchored home 18 feet (5.5 m) off its foundation into a barn. The tornado continued to cause damage as it moved eastward through the south side of Melrose before dissipating.						
EF0	N of Oakwood	Paulding	OH	41.1605°N 84.3897°W	00:16–00:17	0.47 mi (0.76 km)	25 yd (23 m)
EF0	Metal roof panels were ripped from an outbuilding.						
EF2	NNE of Sebastian to NNW of Lock Two	Mercer, Auglaize	OH	40.4722°N 84.5073°W	00:20–00:33	6.4 mi (10.3 km)	300 yd (270 m)
EF2	A strong tornado inflicted significant damage to two homes that lost their roofs and portions of their walls, especially on the second floor. Significant damage also occurred to trees and outbuildings.						
EF1	Greenville to NNE of Gettysburg	Darke	OH	40.0958°N 84.7025°W	00:24–00:42	11.65 mi (18.75 km)	800 yd (730 m)
EF1	A tornado moved through northern Greenville, mainly ripping shingles and siding from many homes. The high school football field and outbuildings along the path also sustained structural damage. Numerous trees were snapped or uprooted.						
EF0	N of Clarksburg	Decatur	IN	39.4395°N 85.3909°W	00:25–00:29	4.48 mi (7.21 km)	100 yd (91 m)
EF0	Larger tree branches were broken and utility poles were damaged.						
EF0	SW of Sulphur Springs	Crawford	IN	38.209°N 86.4863°W	00:42–00:43	0.18 mi (0.29 km)	80 yd (73 m)
EF0	A weak tornado destroyed the lean-to of a small barn, threw a carport about 75 yd (69 m), and snapped or uprooted trees.						
EFU	NE of Leipsic	Putnam	OH	41.1227°N 83.9431°W	00:54–00:55	0.06 mi (0.097 km)	5 yd (4.6 m)
EFU	A trained storm spotter reported a very brief tornado; it did not cause damage.						
EF1	WNW of Whitcomb, IN to SW of Oxford, OH	Franklin (IN), Butler (OH)	IN, OH	39.4624°N 84.9587°W	00:56–01:09	7.96 mi (12.81 km)	300 yd (270 m)
EF1	A tornado moved through the Hickory Woods Campground, snapping or uprooting numerous trees. Numerous camping units and manufactured homes were overturned as well. One home had its roof completely removed and a portion of its second story exterior wall collapsed. Outbuildings and barns along the path were damaged as well.						
EF1	SSE of Oxford to McGonigle	Butler	OH	39.4525°N 84.7276°W	01:20–01:25	2.38 mi (3.83 km)	200 yd (180 m)
EF1	Two outbuildings were destroyed, a home sustained significant roof and garage damage, and trees were downed.						
EF0	NE of Bennettsville	Clark	IN	38.4365°N 85.789°W	01:23–01:26	1.19 mi (1.92 km)	60 yd (55 m)
EF0	This tornado damaged six homes, affecting shingles and roofing. Debris from the houses landed into homes in Sellersburg, including shingles, particle board, and one impressive 2x4 impalement into the side of a house about 9 ft (2.7 m) above the ground.						
EF0	Southeastern Middletown	Butler	OH	39.4759°N 84.3437°W	01:57–01:58	0.28 mi (0.45 km)	80 yd (73 m)
EF0	A brief tornado caused damage to trees and the roofs and siding of structures. A few semi-trailers were overturned or briefly lifted.						
EF0	WNW of Morrow	Warren	OH	39.4045°N 84.2530°W	02:05–02:07	0.33 mi (0.53 km)	100 yd (91 m)
EF0	Multiple trees were snapped or uprooted.						
EF1	South Lebanon to SE of Lebanon	Warren	OH	39.3728°N 84.2130°W	02:08–02:12	2.64 mi (4.25 km)	150 yd (140 m)
EF1	A tornado caused generally minor roof damage, except to one residence that had the roof of its detached garage completely removed and wall partially collapsed. Trees were damaged as well.						
EF0	E of Lebanon	Warren	OH	39.4279°N 84.1794°W	02:14–02:15	0.43 mi (0.69 km)	50 yd (46 m)
EF0	A tornado downed trees and power poles near SR 123.						
EF1	Eastern Morrow	Warren	OH	39.3547°N 84.1290°W	02:15–02:20	2.73 mi (4.39 km)	350 yd (320 m)
EF1	Several homes sustained damage, including a home that sustained the complete removal of its second story and another with partial removal of its roof. Extensive tree damage was observed.						
EF0	WSW of Pansy	Clinton	OH	39.3147°N 83.986°W	02:27–02:29	1.34 mi (2.16 km)	80 yd (73 m)
EF0	A brief tornado caused damage to trees and outbuildings.						
EF0	N of Middleboro	Warren	OH	39.3907°N 84.0272°W	02:27–02:28	0.51 mi (0.82 km)	150 yd (140 m)
EF0	A pole barn was destroyed and had its debris tossed downstream. A home sustained partial roof removal. Numerous trees were snapped or uprooted.						
EF0	E of St. Louisville to N of Hanover	Licking	OH	40.1703°N 82.3427°W	03:49–03:53	3.04 mi (4.89 km)	100 yd (91 m)
EF0	This tornado damaged outbuildings, a barn and snapped multiple trees.						

=== May 8 event ===
List of confirmed tornadoes – Wednesday, May 8, 2024
EF#	Location	County / Parish	State	Start Coord.	Time (UTC)	Path length	Max width
EF1	N of Frazeysburg	Muskingum	OH	40.1577°N 82.1238°W	04:02–04:03	0.42 mi (0.68 km)	128 yd (117 m)
EF1	A brief tornado heavily damaged or destroyed outbuildings, caused roof and exterior damage to homes, snapped wooden poles, and snapped or uprooted trees.						
EF1	SE of Wakatomika	Coshocton	OH	40.1779°N 82.0079°W	04:17–04:19	0.09 mi (0.14 km)	197 yd (180 m)
EF1	A brief tornado heavily damaged trees, homes, and outbuildings. This is the first recorded tornado in Coshocton County since 1985.						
EF2	WNW of Irondale, OH to N of New Manchester, WV to SSW of Hookstown, PA	Jefferson (OH), Hancock (WV), Beaver (PA)	OH, WV, PA	40.5834°N 80.8012°W	04:54–05:17	15.32 mi (24.66 km)	200 yd (180 m)
EF2	A significant tornado initially touched down in northwestern Jefferson County, Ohio, uprooting and snapping many hardwood trees. Near County Highway 55, a mobile home was overturned and several homes were unroofed. The tornado tracked across the center of Irondale, uprooting or snapping numerous trees at EF2 intensity, including some trees that fell on and damaged homes. The tornado then crossed the Ohio River into Hancock County, West Virginia, becoming the first tornado on record for that county. There, the tornado reached its peak strength as a high-end EF2 tornado, inflicting widespread damage to trees and structures. Several barns and outbuildings were destroyed and homes were fully unroofed. Multiple trees were uprooted in western Beaver County, Pennsylvania, before the tornado lifted. Across its path, the tornado traversed mountainous terrain, including a 100 ft (30 m) tall escarpment.						
EF2	SW of Rockwell to southern Hot Springs	Garland	AR	34.393°N 93.198°W	05:30–05:56	12.2 mi (19.6 km)	600 yd (550 m)
EF2	A strong tornado caused damage to multiple commercial, industrial, and residential buildings; mainly to their siding, doors, windows, and roofs. Several manufactured homes were damaged, including several that were pushed off their blocks and one that was overturned. On Lake Hamilton, several floating docks were damaged and multiple large condos had large portions of their roofing structures removed. Additional homes were severely damaged by the numerous trees that were snapped or uprooted.						
EF1	ENE of Imperial-Enlow	Allegheny	PA	40.4623°N 80.1968°W	05:49–05:50	0.2 mi (0.32 km)	150 yd (140 m)
EF1	A brief high-end EF1 tornado overturned a trailer and damaged some trees. A nearby outbuilding also lost a metal roof.						
EF1	N of Ligonier	Westmoreland	PA	40.2986°N 79.2485°W	07:09–07:11	1.14 mi (1.83 km)	200 yd (180 m)
EF1	A tornado snapped and uprooted numerous trees.						
EF0	N of East Cape Girardeau	Cape Girardeau	MO	37.3535°N 89.4773°W	15:58–15:59	0.19 mi (0.31 km)	50 yd (46 m)
EF0	Several large tree branches were broken and a mobile home had some minor damage. A resident's outdoor camera captured the brief tornado on video.						
EF1	NW of Cuba	Crawford	MO	38.137°N 91.477°W	16:04–16:08	2.24 mi (3.60 km)	75 yd (69 m)
EF1	Trees were damaged.						
EF1	Cora	Jackson	IL	37.8067°N 89.6716°W	17:01–17:03	1.26 mi (2.03 km)	100 yd (91 m)
EF1	Numerous trees were damaged, a couple of barns and a carport were destroyed, and a manufactured home was slid about 1 ft (0.30 m) off its foundation. A few homes sustained roof, siding, and fascia damage. One person was injured by a falling tree limb outside.						
EFU	SSW of Sharon Springs	Wallace	KS	38.7786°N 101.7787°W	18:53–18:55	0.06 mi (0.097 km)	50 yd (46 m)
EFU	A landspout tornado occurred over open land.						
EF1	N of Polkville to Cherryville to N of Bessemer City	Cleveland, Gaston	NC	35.433°N 81.651°W	19:00–19:38	21.34 mi (34.34 km)	100 yd (91 m)
EF1	This tornado developed to the north of Polkville snapping and uprooting trees as it passed through Lawndale and south of Fallston. The tornado reached its peak intensity of high-end EF1 as it moved through Cherryville, snapping and uprooting numerous trees. The tornado continued to down trees before dissipating north of Bessemer City.						
EFU	WNW of Narcissa	Ottawa	OK	36.824°N 94.991°W	19:10	0.1 mi (0.16 km)	75 yd (69 m)
EFU	Storm chasers reported a brief tornado.						
EFU	NW of Narcissa	Ottawa	OK	36.827°N 94.972°W	19:12	0.1 mi (0.16 km)	75 yd (69 m)
EFU	Storm chasers reported a brief tornado.						
EF1	NNW of Narcissa to S of Miami	Ottawa	OK	36.8288°N 94.9499°W	19:15–19:23	4 mi (6.4 km)	450 yd (410 m)
EF1	An outbuilding was destroyed, a few homes were damaged, and numerous trees were snapped or uprooted.						
EF1	Northern Gastonia to northern Belmont	Gaston	NC	35.281°N 81.21°W	19:40–19:50	8.22 mi (13.23 km)	60 yd (55 m)
EF1	Numerous trees were snapped or uprooted. Several buildings and a warehouse sustained minor roof damage. Multiple power poles were snapped.						
EF1	Stroudville	Robertson	TN	36.4717°N 87.1022°W	19:43–19:49	2.2 mi (3.5 km)	200 yd (180 m)
EF1	Sheeting and panels were ripped from a barn. Another older barn was thrown downstream. Three homes lost shingles and roofing material in addition to sustaining damage to their gutters and soffit. Numerous trees were snapped or uprooted, including one that fell onto a home.						
EF1	NW of Seneca, MO	Ottawa	OK	36.8601°N 94.6379°W	19:51–19:52	0.3 mi (0.48 km)	60 yd (55 m)
EF1	Several homes were damaged and trees were uprooted.						
EF1	E of Boskydell to S of Carterville	Jackson, Williamson	IL	37.6647°N 89.1739°W	20:10–20:26	4.56 mi (7.34 km)	75 yd (69 m)
EF1	A large tree was uprooted and numerous tree limbs were damaged or downed. A barn sustained roof damage.						
EFU	SSW of Tyler	McCracken	KY	37.0176°N 88.6001°W	21:01–21:02	0.2 mi (0.32 km)	50 yd (46 m)
EFU	This brief tornado was filmed and witnessed by several people. No damage was caused.						
EF0	N of Goreville to southern Creal Springs	Williamson	IL	37.6031°N 88.959°W	21:04–21:11	6.57 mi (10.57 km)	25 yd (23 m)
EF0	A weak tornado caused intermittent damage to tree limbs and uprooted a few trees.						
EF1	SSW of Ledford to Somerset	Saline	IL	37.677°N 88.5875°W	21:11–21:26	7.74 mi (12.46 km)	150 yd (140 m)
EF1	Several dozen trees were snapped or uprooted. A few homes and barns sustained minor roof damage, while one house was slightly shifted off its foundation.						
EFU	S of Cavour	Beadle	SD	44.28°N 98.03°W	21:15	unknown	unknown
EFU	A landspout was recorded and photographed.						
EF1	E of Monett to SE of Aurora	Barry, Lawrence	MO	36.91°N 93.89°W	21:25–21:46	10.77 mi (17.33 km)	150 yd (140 m)
EF1	A manufactured home was overturned, some roofs were damaged, and several trees were snapped or uprooted.						
EF3	Columbia to SW of Lunns Store	Maury, Marshall	TN	35.6095°N 87.0007°W	22:37–23:07	11.53 mi (18.56 km)	900 yd (820 m)
EF3	1 death – See section on this tornado – 12 people were injured.						
EF0	S of Rockvale	Rutherford	TN	35.6936°N 86.5033°W	23:32–23:36	2.96 mi (4.76 km)	100 yd (91 m)
EF0	Trees were uprooted, and large tree branches were snapped.						
EF0	NNW of Sumner	Lamar	TX	33.8013°N 95.7045°W	00:40	0.01 mi (0.016 km)	30 yd (27 m)
EF0	Small tree branches were broken.						
EF2	WSW of Prospect to WNW of Ardmore	Giles	TN	35.0232°N 87.0405°W	00:50–01:00	5.88 mi (9.46 km)	600 yd (550 m)
EF2	A manufactured home was completely removed from its base and demolished. Additional frame homes sustained roof damage. Numerous trees were damaged as well. One person was injured.						
EF1	S of Lester	Limestone	AL	34.8932°N 87.155°W	01:11–01:26	4.77 mi (7.68 km)	90 yd (82 m)
EF1	Large trees were snapped or uprooted.						
EF1	NE of Taft	Lincoln	TN	35.0728°N 86.7742°W	01:15–01:33	6.22 mi (10.01 km)	160 yd (150 m)
EF1	Numerous trees were snapped or uprooted. One home sustained minor roof damage.						
EF3	SE of Rogersville	Lawrence, Limestone	AL	34.7367°N 87.2176°W	01:23–01:30	3.76 mi (6.05 km)	228 yd (208 m)
EF3	Numerous trees were snapped or uprooted in Lawrence County before this tornado crossed Wheeler Lake into the Brigadoon neighborhood of Limestone County, briefly causing low-end EF3 damage along the lakeshore. One home had all of its exterior walls that were facing the lake along with its two-story four-car garage collapsed as well as partial roof loss. Other nearby homes suffered substantial roof and exterior damage, and vehicles were damaged. The tornado then weakened, continuing to shatter windows, cause roof and exterior damage to homes, and knock down fences before dissipating in a field outside of the subdivision. Many large trees were snapped or uprooted along the path.						
EF0	S of Pin Hook	Lamar	TX	33.8012°N 95.3225°W	01:27–01:28	0.32 mi (0.51 km)	30 yd (27 m)
EF0	A short-lived tornado damaged some small tree limbs and tin metal.						
EF1	SW of Annapolis	Reynolds, Iron, Madison	MO	37.303°N 90.761°W	01:44–01:58	14.07 mi (22.64 km)	150 yd (140 m)
EF1	This tornado broke numerous tree limbs and uprooted a large tree in Reynolds County, before intensifying as it crossed into Iron County. Numerous trees were snapped or uprooted and a house sustained minor shingle damage. The tornado dissipated quickly after crossing into Madison County, shortly after uprooting a few more trees.						
EF1	NE of Elkmont	Limestone	AL	34.9458°N 86.9254°W	01:45–01:50	3.47 mi (5.58 km)	225 yd (206 m)
EF1	More than half of a private aircraft hangar was collapsed. A few shingles were displaced from a home's roof. Multiple trees were snapped or uprooted.						
EF1	Annapolis	Iron	MO	37.36°N 90.706°W	01:49–01:51	2.56 mi (4.12 km)	250 yd (230 m)
EF1	This tornado touched down just west of Annapolis and quickly entered town. A manufactured home lost most of its roofing and the elementary school had a large section its roof ripped off, several walls blown over and numerous windows broken. The tornado exited Annapolis and continued snapping and uprooting trees before dissipating.						
EF0	NNE of Vulcan	Iron	MO	37.347°N 90.669°W	01:50–01:51	0.59 mi (0.95 km)	75 yd (69 m)
EF0	A brief tornado uprooted and snapped several large trees.						
EF1	NW of Brunot	Iron	MO	37.333°N 90.59°W	01:53–01:56	1.67 mi (2.69 km)	150 yd (140 m)
EF1	Multiple trees were snapped and/or uprooted.						
EF1	Arcadia to NNW of Oak Grove	Iron, Madison	MO	37.592°N 90.63°W	02:01–02:09	12.01 mi (19.33 km)	150 yd (140 m)
EF1	A tornado touched down in Arcadia, snapping trees throughout the town. After exiting town, the tornado continued to snap or uproot trees through rural portions of Iron and Madison counties.						
EF1	Arcadia	Iron	MO	37.585°N 90.635°W	02:01–02:04	4.08 mi (6.57 km)	100 yd (91 m)
EF1	A second tornado touched down in Arcadia, this time in the southwestern portion of town. Trees were snapped and uprooted.						
EF1	WSW of Flintville	Lincoln	TN	35.0497°N 86.4921°W	02:02–02:06	1.38 mi (2.22 km)	286 yd (262 m)
EF1	Almost 75 percent of the roof was ripped from a home, while the entire roof and some rafters were torn from a large storage shed. Another home was damaged, trees were uprooted, and a power pole was toppled as well.						
EF0	Fredericktown	Madison	MO	37.545°N 90.361°W	02:06–02:10	4.27 mi (6.87 km)	334 yd (305 m)
EF0	Homes and farm outbuildings sustained minor damage. Trees were damaged as well.						
EF0	Northern Madison	Madison	AL	34.7411°N 86.7364°W	02:07–02:11	1.73 mi (2.78 km)	95 yd (87 m)
EF0	This high-end EF0 tornado snapped or uprooted numerous trees. Two homes were damaged by falling trees.						
EF2	Huntsville to W of Gurley	Madison	AL	34.7384°N 86.5804°W	02:28–02:48	9.51 mi (15.30 km)	550 yd (500 m)
EF2	This strong tornado snapped or uprooted numerous trees, partially uplifted the roofs of four houses, and caused shingle damage to additional homes along its track.						
EF0	N of Saint Joseph	Daviess	KY	37.7112°N 87.3633°W	02:39–02:42	2.66 mi (4.28 km)	50 yd (46 m)
EF0	A few hog barns sustained roof damage, a house had a few shingles removed, and numerous large tree limbs were downed.						
EF0	WNW of Saint Joseph to West Louisville	Daviess	KY	37.7063°N 87.3431°W	02:41–02:46	3.11 mi (5.01 km)	300 yd (270 m)
EF0	This tornado was a twin to the above tornado. A few barn outbuildings had portions of their roofs removed. One outbuilding had a portion of its exterior wall destroyed as well. A few wooden power poles were damaged or leaned, a carport was tossed, and numerous trees were snapped or uprooted.						
EF1	SW of Owensboro	Daviess	KY	37.7292°N 87.182°W	02:49–02:50	0.86 mi (1.38 km)	100 yd (91 m)
EF1	A farm outbuilding were severely damaged and its accompanying heavy machinery was tossed or pushed into nearby fields. A grain bin and additional outbuildings sustained damage as well. Multiple trees were snapped.						
EF0	NE of Woodville	Jackson	AL	34.6807°N 86.2279°W	03:13–03:16	2.28 mi (3.67 km)	106 yd (97 m)
EF0	A high-end EF0 tornado caused tree damage.						
EF1	SW of Tails Creek	Gilmer	GA	34.6724°N 84.6408°W	03:26–03:28	0.76 mi (1.22 km)	200 yd (180 m)
EF1	Hundreds of trees were snapped or uprooted.						
EF0	Northern Huntsville	Madison	AL	34.7624°N 86.6427°W	03:32–03:44	3.53 mi (5.68 km)	145 yd (133 m)
EF0	A very weak tornado caused sporadic trees and inflicted minor roof damage to a home.						
EF0	Scottsboro	Jackson	AL	34.6864°N 86.064°W	03:34–03:37	2.09 mi (3.36 km)	200 yd (180 m)
EF0	This high-end EF0 tornado snapped trees and peeled metal roofing and siding from a few structures.						
EF1	Eastern Huntsville	Madison	AL	34.723°N 86.5598°W	03:40–03:53	4.35 mi (7.00 km)	200 yd (180 m)
EF1	Multiple trees were snapped or uprooted, some of which caused damage to at least two homes upon falling. The tornado track was just south of the EF2 tornado that impacted Huntsville just an hour earlier.						
EF1	Peachtree	Cherokee	NC	35.0917°N 83.9532°W	03:41–03:42	2.33 mi (3.75 km)	40 yd (37 m)
EF1	A brief tornado snapped or uprooted numerous trees.						
EF1	SW of East Ellijay	Gilmer	GA	34.6641°N 84.5084°W	03:42–03:44	0.64 mi (1.03 km)	150 yd (140 m)
EF1	Parts of two single-story storage units, as well as a Georgia Forestry building, were destroyed. Additional structures sustained minor roof damage, and a few trees were snapped.						
EF0	N of Ellijay	Gilmer	GA	34.7428°N 84.5015°W	03:46–03:48	0.98 mi (1.58 km)	250 yd (230 m)
EF0	Numerous trees were snapped or uprooted, some of which fell onto homes.						
EF0	SE of East Ellijay	Gilmer	GA	34.666°N 84.4484°W	03:51–03:54	1.94 mi (3.12 km)	200 yd (180 m)
EF0	Numerous trees were snapped or uprooted.						
EF3	S of Pisgah to NW of Hammondville	Jackson, DeKalb	AL	34.6407°N 85.8578°W	03:57–04:24	12.34 mi (19.86 km)	880 yd (800 m)
EF3	See section on this tornado – Seven people were injured.						

=== May 9 event ===
List of confirmed tornadoes – Thursday, May 9, 2024
EF#	Location	County / Parish	State	Start Coord.	Time (UTC)	Path length	Max width
EF1	SSE of Tuckasegee	Jackson	NC	35.246°N 83.259°W	04:14–04:27	9.38 mi (15.10 km)	400 yd (370 m)
EF1	A high-end EF1 tornado occurred in the Appalachian Mountains where numerous trees were snapped or uprooted.						
EF0	Black Mountain	Buncombe	NC	35.642°N 82.349°W	04:16–04:18	2.32 mi (3.73 km)	30 yd (27 m)
EF0	Numerous trees were snapped or uprooted. Several homes sustained damage from fallen trees. A communications tower at the Black Mountain fire station was toppled.						
EF1	SSW of Tuckasegee	Jackson	NC	35.207°N 83.152°W	04:23–04:26	1.52 mi (2.45 km)	200 yd (180 m)
EF1	A brief tornado downed several trees and snapped numerous large branches.						
EF1	SW of Henagar	DeKalb	AL	34.605°N 85.812°W	05:02–05:05	1.96 mi (3.15 km)	100 yd (91 m)
EF1	A high-end EF1 tornado tracked just to the south of the Henager EF3 tornado. Numerous trees were snapped or uprooted, including some that fell on and damaged structures.						
EF0	ENE of Holladay	Benton	TN	35.8901°N 88.0419°W	06:39–06:41	1.31 mi (2.11 km)	100 yd (91 m)
EF0	This intermittent tornado damaged a few trees before lifting.						
EF0	S of Whitmire	Newberry	SC	34.49°N 81.63°W	06:46–06:51	3.01 mi (4.84 km)	150 yd (140 m)
EF0	A weak tornado caused scattered tree damage.						
EF0	NE of Monticello	Fairfield	SC	34.37°N 81.28°W	07:12–07:14	0.34 mi (0.55 km)	50 yd (46 m)
EF0	Multiple trees were snapped or downed.						
EF1	S of Ridgeway	Fairfield	SC	34.27°N 81°W	07:31–07:36	1.89 mi (3.04 km)	250 yd (230 m)
EF1	Numerous trees were snapped or uprooted. One tree fell on a home, causing damage to its roof, siding, and gutters.						
EF1	WNW of Fayetteville	Lincoln	TN	35.1939°N 86.765°W	08:44–08:50	4.21 mi (6.78 km)	105 yd (96 m)
EF1	A home lost about a quarter of its roof. Two barn structures were heavily damaged while a third had a small portion of its roof ripped off. Numerous trees were snapped or uprooted.						
EF1	SE of Kirkland, TN to ESE of New Market, AL	Lincoln (TN), Madison (AL)	TN, AL	34.9732°N 86.5342°W	09:01–09:19	13.65 mi (21.97 km)	215 yd (197 m)
EF1	This tornado first touched down in the Eastwood Estates in Tennessee, causing structural damage to a manufactured home and uprooting numerous trees. After splitting and uprooting additional trees as it moved southeastward, the tornado crossed into Alabama north of Hazel Green, uprooting a large tree and snapping large tree branches. The tornado then moved east-southeastward, uprooting a tree that fell on, and caused roof damage to a home. After, turning back to the southeast and uprooting additional trees, snapping more large tree limbs, and inflicting shingle damage to homes, the tornado moved through the small community of New Market. Large tree limbs were snapped, and trees were uprooting in the town. The tornado then continued first east-southward and then southeastward out of New Market, sporadically snapping large tree limbs before dissipating.						
EF1	SW of Flintville, TN to SW of Elora, TN	Lincoln (TN), Madison (AL)	TN, AL	35.0422°N 86.4595°W	09:06–09:16	6.06 mi (9.75 km)	300 yd (270 m)
EF1	Numerous trees were snapped and uprooted. The tornado dissipated almost immediately after crossing Tennessee-Alabama state line.						
EF1	E of Flintville to S of Huntland	Lincoln, Franklin	TN	35.0665°N 86.3928°W	09:10–09:23	9.23 mi (14.85 km)	194 yd (177 m)
EF1	A pole barn was destroyed, and numerous trees were snapped and uprooted. Further analysis of the tornado via drone footage and satellite imagery is planned to determine if the tornado's path was longer than currently indicated.						
EF1	WNW of Skyline	Jackson	AL	34.8506°N 86.239°W	09:31–09:32	0.3 mi (0.48 km)	108 yd (99 m)
EF1	Numerous trees, including large trees, were snapped or uprooted. A manufactured home was shifted 10–15 ft (3.0–4.6 m) from its original location, and more than half of its roof was destroyed. One person was injured.						
EF1	N of Skyline	Jackson	AL	34.8664°N 86.1027°W	09:37–09:42	1.06 mi (1.71 km)	170 yd (160 m)
EF1	Trees were snapped or uprooted, one of which caused roof damage to a home upon falling. Satellite imagery was used to determine the starting point of the tornado, which was further to the northwest than originally thought.						
EF1	Pisgah to NW of Sylvania	Jackson	AL	34.6949°N 85.8559°W	10:08–10:17	6.06 mi (9.75 km)	241 yd (220 m)
EF1	A tornado began in Pisgah, where several large limbs were snapped off of trees. The tornado moved due south snapping and uprooting numerous more trees, before crossing the path of the Henagar EF3 tornado. The tornado lifted shortly after intersecting the path.						
EF1	SE of Cochran to SE of Plainfield	Dodge	GA	32.3056°N 83.2747°W	16:50–17:00	12.2 mi (19.6 km)	150 yd (140 m)
EF1	This tornado caused significant damage, ripping the roofs off of small structures, damaging homes and snapping or uprooting trees.						
EF0	N of Jay Bird Springs to SSE of Cedar Grove	Laurens	GA	32.2267°N 83.0107°W	17:06–17:17	8.61 mi (13.86 km)	100 yd (91 m)
EF0	A few trees were snapped as this tornado moved through rural and wooded areas.						
EF0	NNE of McRae to Alamo	Wheeler	GA	32.1536°N 82.8758°W	17:18–17:25	7.18 mi (11.56 km)	150 yd (140 m)
EF0	This tornado initially only snapped and uprooted trees before striking Alamo. In Alamo, the tornado damaged a small outbuilding, a canopy and a light pole, and broke the glass windows of a retail store. Some fences were downed as well.						
EF1	S of Kibbee to Vidalia to Lyons	Montgomery, Toombs	GA	32.2466°N 82.5416°W	17:39–17:54	14.66 mi (23.59 km)	250 yd (230 m)
EF1	Numerous trees were snapped or uprooted, many of which fell onto homes, outbuildings, and vehicles. A roof was peeled off one structure. Minor damage was inflicted at an elementary, a middle, and a high school, mainly to trees, fences, and some storage building doors.						
EF0	S of Charles City	Floyd	IA	43.0222°N 92.6716°W	18:03–18:05	0.63 mi (1.01 km)	30 yd (27 m)
EF0	A brief landspout tornado was well-documented and did not cause damage.						
EF1	ESE of North Hills	Wood	WV	39.2763°N 81.3898°W	00:19–00:21	3.4 mi (5.5 km)	250 yd (230 m)
EF1	A manufactured home and a barn were flipped over, causing minor injury to an occupant of the home. Trees were snapped or uprooted.						
EF0	N of Masontown	Preston	WV	39.571°N 79.801°W	00:55–00:56	0.43 mi (0.69 km)	50 yd (46 m)
EF0	A home had nearly half its roof removed. Trees were snapped or downed, one of which fell on a vehicle.						
EF0	NE of Edwards to Bolton	Hinds	MS	32.3659°N 90.5406°W	03:11–03:21	4.86 mi (7.82 km)	105 yd (96 m)
EF0	Large trees were snapped or uprooted.						

=== May 10 event ===
List of confirmed tornadoes – Friday, May 10, 2024
EF#	Location	County / Parish	State	Start Coord.	Time (UTC)	Path length	Max width
EF2	SW of Old Texas to Georgiana	Monroe, Conecuh, Butler	AL	31.7143°N 87.0641°W	07:03–07:25	24.24 mi (39.01 km)	1,200 yd (1,100 m)
EF2	This long-track, multi-vortex EF2 tornado began southwest of Old Texas, Alabama, and traveled east-southeast through Georgiana. Initially intensifying to EF2 strength, it caused widespread tree snaps and uproots, particularly in a forested area. The tornado developed multiple sub-vortices, some reaching EF1 to EF2 intensity, leading to significant tree damage across its large width. It briefly weakened before causing more tree damage and flipping a manufactured home near a highway. The tornado narrowed and weakened further as it approached Georgiana, with its final damage observed in the destruction of outbuildings and uprooted trees east of the town. No tornado warning was issued for this storm.						
EF2	SE of Jay to Munson to NW of Baker	Santa Rosa, Okaloosa	FL	30.93°N 87.12°W	08:41–09:04	24.9 mi (40.1 km)	1,000 yd (910 m)
EF2	This low-end EF2 tornado began southeast of Jay, tracking east-southeast and initially causing a narrow path of significant tree damage. As it intensified, the tornado caused extensive deforestation, snapping pine and oak trees and downing power lines in a convergent pattern, especially near Munson. The tornado broadened into a multi-vortex system east of Munson, continuing to cause tree damage as it crossed into Okaloosa County before dissipating.						
EFU	E of New York to NNW of Allentown	Santa Rosa	FL	30.824°N 87.1358°W	08:42–08:46	4.48 mi (7.21 km)	30 yd (27 m)
EFU	A tornado snapped trees before it dissipated just before reaching a highway. The exact intensity of the tornado is yet to be determined pending higher resolution imagery.						
EFU	ENE of Allentown	Santa Rosa	FL	30.8071°N 86.9828°W	08:50–08:51	0.7 mi (1.1 km)	30 yd (27 m)
EFU	This tornado caused damage in a dense forest that was discovered via satellite imagery. The intensity of the tornado may be able to be evaluated depending on higher resolution satellite imagery.						
EFU	S of Munson	Santa Rosa	FL	30.7886°N 86.9177°W	08:54–08:58	3.16 mi (5.09 km)	30 yd (27 m)
EFU	A tornado tracked entirely through forested areas and was found from satellite imagery. The intensity of the tornado is yet to be determined pending further analysis of higher resolution imagery.						
EF0	SE of Dothan to N of Cottonwood	Houston	AL	31.1212°N 85.3588°W	09:02–09:20	4.43 mi (7.13 km)	125 yd (114 m)
EF0	Outbuildings were significantly damaged and farm buildings were damaged as well.						
EFU	SE of Crestview	Okaloosa	FL	30.7271°N 86.5168°W	09:16–09:18	2.51 mi (4.04 km)	30 yd (27 m)
EFU	This tornado caused a narrow path of damage in forested areas south of I-10 near Crestview. It was confirmed from satellite imagery and its intensity may be able to be determined depending on higher resolution imagery.						
EF0	SW of Mossy Head	Walton	FL	30.69°N 86.37°W	09:25–09:28	3.15 mi (5.07 km)	25 yd (23 m)
EF0	A tornado occurred in the northeastern area of Eglin Air Force Base. Minor tree and vegetation damage occurred.						
EF0	E of Freeport	Walton	FL	30.48°N 86.07°W	09:47–09:49	1.38 mi (2.22 km)	25 yd (23 m)
EF0	A brief tornado damaged trees.						
EF2	S of Gretna to Tallahassee	Gadsden, Leon	FL	30.55°N 84.65°W	10:36–11:03	24.21 mi (38.96 km)	900 yd (820 m)
EF2	See article on this tornado						
EF1	NW of Bloxham to NNW of Natural Bridge	Leon	FL	30.399°N 84.636°W	10:42–11:13	31.44 mi (50.60 km)	1,100 yd (1,000 m)
EF1	This long-track, high-end EF1 tornado was the second of three simultaneous large tornadoes in Leon County. It snapped and uprooted numerous trees in the Apalachicola National Forest, many of which fell onto cars and homes.						
EF2	SSW of Midway to Tallahassee to SW of Lloyd	Leon, Jefferson	FL	30.44°N 84.49°W	10:50–11:14	24.81 mi (39.93 km)	1,400 yd (1,300 m)
EF2	2 deaths – See article on this tornado						
EF1	SW of Lamont to SE of Lee	Jefferson, Madison, Taylor	FL	30.3468°N 83.8326°W	11:31–12:02	37.52 mi (60.38 km)	1,300 yd (1,200 m)
EF1	The tornado initially caused EF0 damage in Jefferson County, twisting and snapping young pine trees. As it moved into Madison County, it intensified to EF1, uprooting trees and damaging a trailer. The tornado continued through rural areas, snapping and uprooting trees and damaging farmland irrigation systems before dissipating near the Madison-Suwannee county border.						

== See also ==
- Weather of 2024
- List of North American tornadoes and tornado outbreaks
- List of F4 and EF4 tornadoes
  - List of F4 and EF4 tornadoes (2020–present)
- Tornadoes of 2024
- List of United States tornadoes in May 2024
- Tornado outbreak of May 6–10, 2024
