= Tornado outbreak of May 6–10, 2024 =

2024 tornado outbreak in the Southern and Central United States

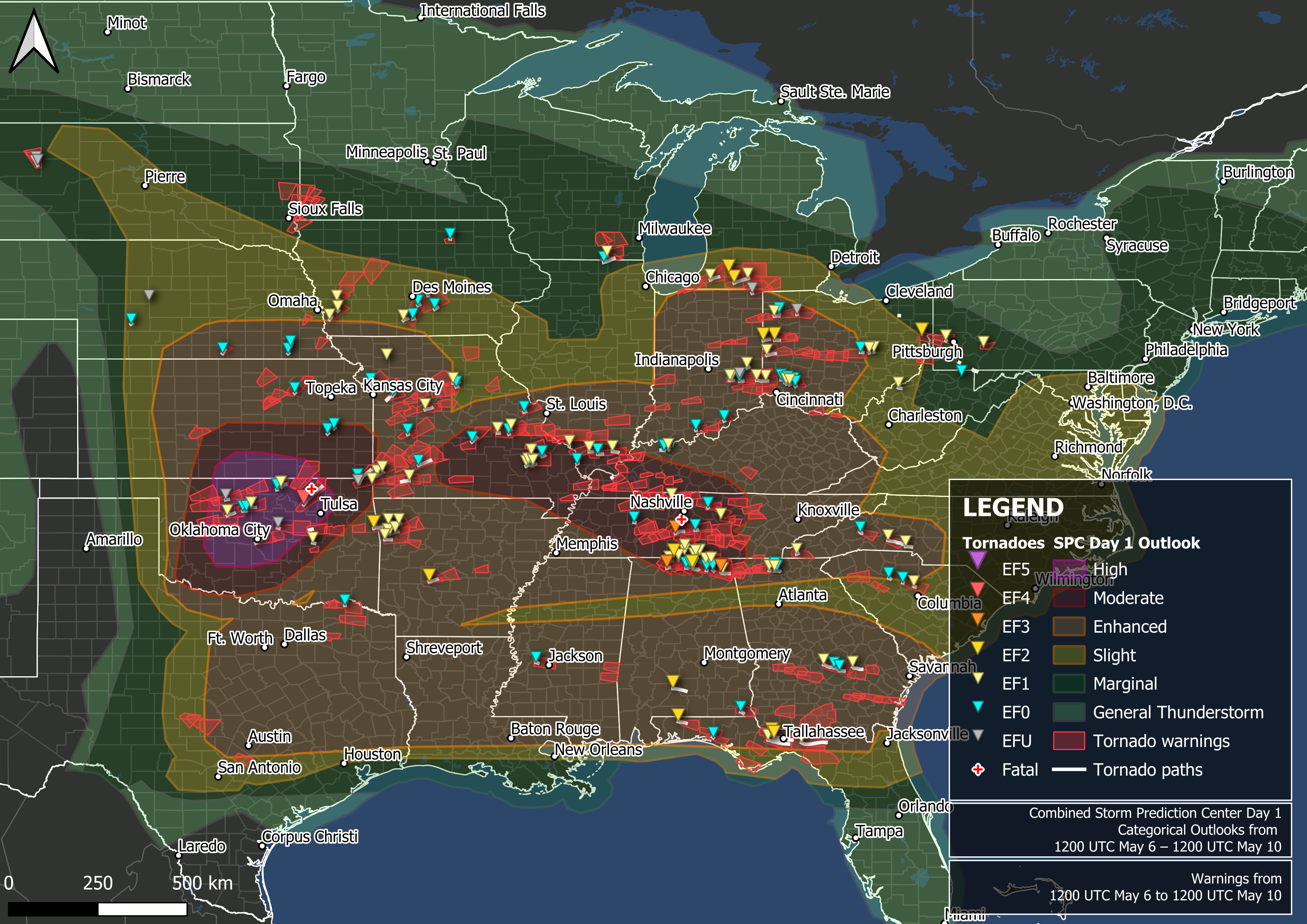
- Map of tornado warnings and confirmed tornadoes from the outbreak

Meteorological history
- Duration: May 6–10, 2024

Tornado outbreak
- Tornadoes: 180
- Max. rating: EF4 tornado
- Duration: 3 days, 2 hours and 20 minutes
- Highest winds: Tornadic – 180 mph (290 km/h) (Barnsdall, Oklahoma EF4 on May 6)
- Highest gusts: Non-tornadic – >100 mph (160 km/h) near Tallahassee, Florida on May 10
- Largest hail: 6.25 in (15.9 cm) – Johnson City, Texas on May 9

Extratropical cyclone
- Lowest pressure: 980 hPa (mbar); 28.94 inHg

Overall effects
- Fatalities: 5 (+3 non-tornadic)
- Injuries: 88–92+
- Missing: 1
- Damage: $6.1 billion (2024 USD)
- Areas affected: Midwestern, Southern United States, Great Plains, Ohio Valley, New England
- Power outages: >201,000
- Part of the Tornadoes of 2024

A major tornado outbreak occurred across the Central and Southern United States between May 6 and 10, 2024, as a result of a slow-moving trough that was moving across the country. The Storm Prediction Center (SPC) issued a tornado-driven high risk convective outlook for portions of central Oklahoma and extreme southern Kansas early on May 6. Millions of people were put under a particularly dangerous situation (PDS) tornado watch later that evening, as many tornadoes were reported across the region, particularly in Oklahoma, where a violent EF4 tornado struck the towns of Barnsdall and Bartlesville, Oklahoma. Severe and tornadic weather spread eastward over the Mississippi, Ohio, and Tennessee Valleys over the next two days, with a nocturnal outbreak occurring in the latter on May 8, as tornadic supercell thunderstorms produced many tornadoes across the states of Tennessee, northern Alabama and western Georgia. The system responsible for the outbreak finally moved offshore by May 10 after producing several more tornadoes across the Southeast, including two EF2 tornadoes and hurricane-strength straight-line winds that moved through Tallahassee. This large outbreak came less than two weeks after a similarly large and deadly outbreak occurred across most of the same regions.

Five fatalities directly linked to the tornadoes were confirmed from the outbreak: two in Oklahoma on May 6, one in Tennessee on May 8, and two in Florida on May 10. Three non-tornadic deaths related to straight-line winds also occurred. In addition, during the outbreak, tornado emergencies were issued for three consecutive days between May 6–8 for damaging tornadoes; the last time that this phenomenon had occurred was exactly 21 years prior, when tornado emergencies were issued for four consecutive days between May 6–9, 2003, during a similarly large outbreak.

Overall, 180 tornadoes were confirmed from the outbreak, most of which were clustered around Oklahoma, Michigan, Tennessee, and Alabama, earning 51 points on the outbreak intensity score.

== Meteorological synopsis ==
=== May 6 ===
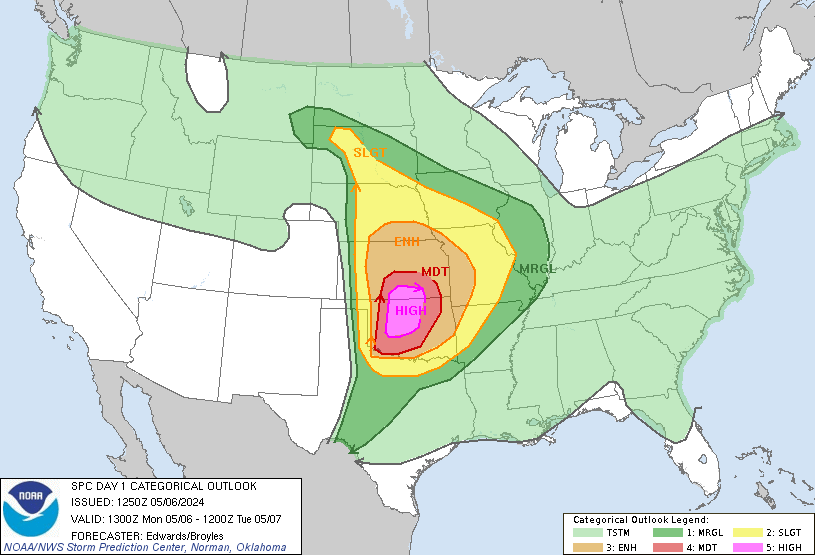
High risk convective outlook issued by the Storm Prediction Center at 13:00 UTC on May 6

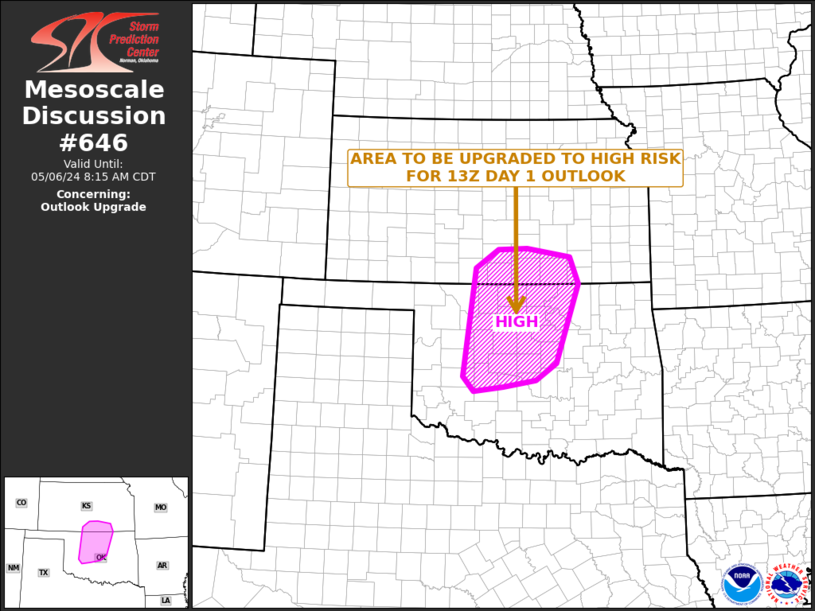
Mesoscale discussion issued by the Storm Prediction Center at 7:12 am CDT on May 6 concerning the upgrade to high risk

Starting April 30, the Storm Prediction Center noted that certain models, including the ECMWF, forecasted a multi-day period of high instability and supportive wind shear across the Southern and Central Plains, and by May 1, a 15% risk was added across Nebraska, Kansas, Oklahoma, and northern Texas. On May 3, as confidence in a significant tornado outbreak increased, a 30% risk zone was introduced in far northern Oklahoma, central Kansas, and far southern Nebraska, and on May 5, a moderate risk was issued as forecasters noted the possibility of strong and long-tracked tornadoes and large hail.

At 7:12 a.m. Central Daylight Time on May 6, a mesoscale discussion was issued concerning an upgrade to a tornado-driven high risk across central and north central Oklahoma and south central Kansas, which was issued at the 1300Z outlook. A separate system also spawned severe thunderstorms in Tennessee, including one that produced an EF1 tornado that moved through Smithville.

At 1630Z, the Storm Prediction Center, noting severe activity in Tennessee as well as confidence in cells further south within Oklahoma, issued a new convective outlook, which expanded the high-risk area further south, the moderate risk further east, and added a marginal risk over the Tennessee Valley. This notably mentioned the presence of mixed-layer CAPE values between 2,500 and 4,500 j/kg across central and northern Oklahoma into southern Kansas, as severe activity was set to peak through the night, and at 2 pm, a particularly dangerous situation tornado watch was issued, noting the probability of 2 or more tornadoes at >95%, and at least 1 significant tornado at 90%. At 300Z, an observed sounding from the National Weather Service office in Norman, Oklahoma indicated an incredibly favorable environment for supercellular tornadoes, with mixed-layer CAPE values over 3,500 j/kg as well as strong wind shear and lapse rates, with a formulated Significant Tornado Parameter (STP) of 14.9.

One hour earlier, a powerful supercell spawned a violent tornado southeast of Hominy, Oklahoma. The tornado continued northeast, producing significant tree damage. As the tornado closed in on the city of Barnsdall, a tornado emergency was issued. The tornado inflicted EF4 damage to a well-constructed home south of Barnsdall and to a two-story home in the southeast side of the town; widespread EF3 damage occurred to other homes and a well-built, metal-framed building. Intense tree damage occurred in this area as well. At least one person was killed in the city. The tornado continued northeast and moved into Bartlesville, Oklahoma, where a Hampton Inn suffered severe damage. The tornado dissipated northeast of the town. However, despite several supercells forming throughout the days, all the other tornadoes that occurred across the Plains were weak. A line of storms developed in southwestern Oklahoma that night, but most of them dissipated quickly without becoming severe and, as a result, areas in southern part of the high risk and further south did not see any storms. The only storm of the cluster to become severe tracked through the Oklahoma City metropolitan area producing intense straight-line winds and two weak EF1 tornadoes.

=== May 7–8 ===
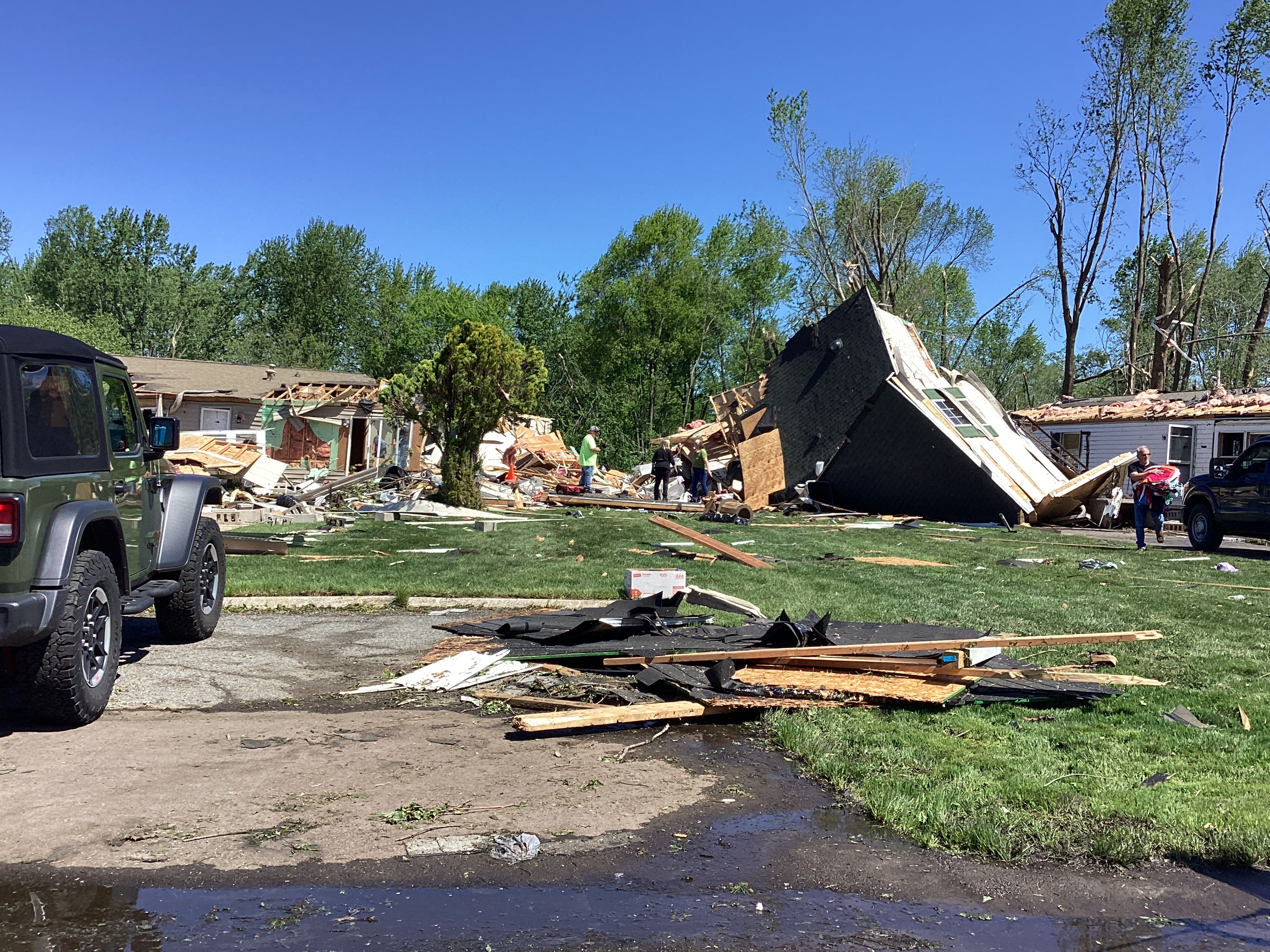
Mobile homes that were destroyed at high-end EF2 intensity in Portage, Michigan.

On May 7, a tornado-driven enhanced risk was issued across the Ohio Valley by the Storm Prediction Center. That afternoon, a strong, high-end EF2 tornado caused severe damage in Portage, Michigan. Later, another tornado prompted the issuance of a tornado emergency for Union City and Sherwood, the first tornado emergency ever issued in the state of Michigan. Other tornadoes were reported across Michigan along with Ohio, West Virginia, Indiana, Arkansas, and Pennsylvania through the overnight hours into May 8. Later on May 8, a wind and hail driven Moderate Risk was introduced, both at 45% hatched wind and hail risks, more severe weather and tornadoes impacted much of the Middle Mississippi and Tennessee Valleys. PDS tornado warnings were issued for tornadoes near Equality, Illinois and Aurora, Missouri. Multiple strong supercells hit Connecticut, Rhode Island, and Massachusetts. At 6:54 pm CDT a tornado emergency was issued for parts of Marshall County, Maury County, Rutherford County, and Williamson County including Spring Hill, Tennessee, Chapel Hill, Tennessee, and Allisona, Tennessee of the Southern Nashville Metro area, a second in 5 months, after a Tornado Emergency in the north of the metro that hit Hendersonville on December 9, 2023. In the middle of the outbreak, the SPC issued a 15% hatched tornado driven Moderate risk for Southeastern Tennessee, Northwestern Georgia and North Alabama at 0100 UTC. Two flash flood emergencies were issued for parts of Northern Tennessee after round of torrential rainfall battered the area. Later, another supercell in Alabama caused a PDS tornado warning for the city of Huntsville, Alabama. That same supercell went on to produce another damaging tornado that sparked a tornado emergency for Henagar, Alabama, Hammondville, Alabama, and Mentone, Alabama.

=== May 9–10 ===
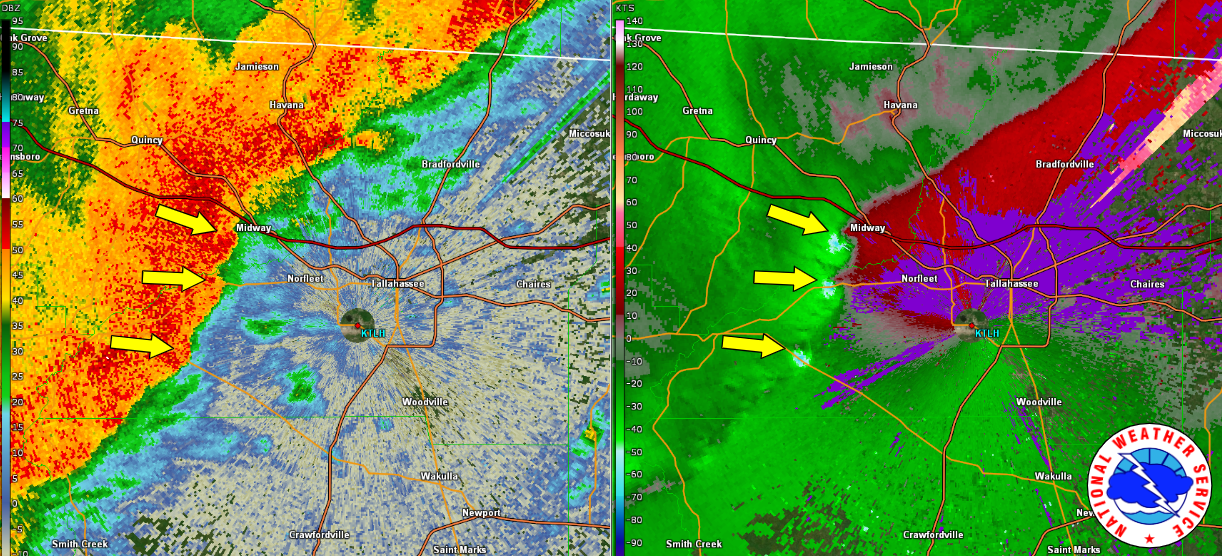
Radar imagery depicting the three simultaneous tornadoes in Leon County, Florida on the morning of May 10, 2024.

Isolated tornadoes occurred during the day on May 9. Additionally, several supercells produced large hail across Texas. Widespread damaging winds occurred overnight into the next day, from a congealing squall line, along with a few tornadoes including two EF2 tornadoes and an EF1 tornado in the Tallahassee Metropolitan area. The outbreak ended as severe storms moved offshore during the afternoon hours of May 10.

== Confirmed tornadoes ==
Confirmed tornadoes by Enhanced Fujita rating
EFU	EF0	EF1	EF2	EF3	EF4	EF5	Total
17	67	79	13	3	1	0	180

=== Hominy–Barnsdall–Bartlesville, Oklahoma ===
Hominy–Barnsdall–Bartlesville, Oklahoma
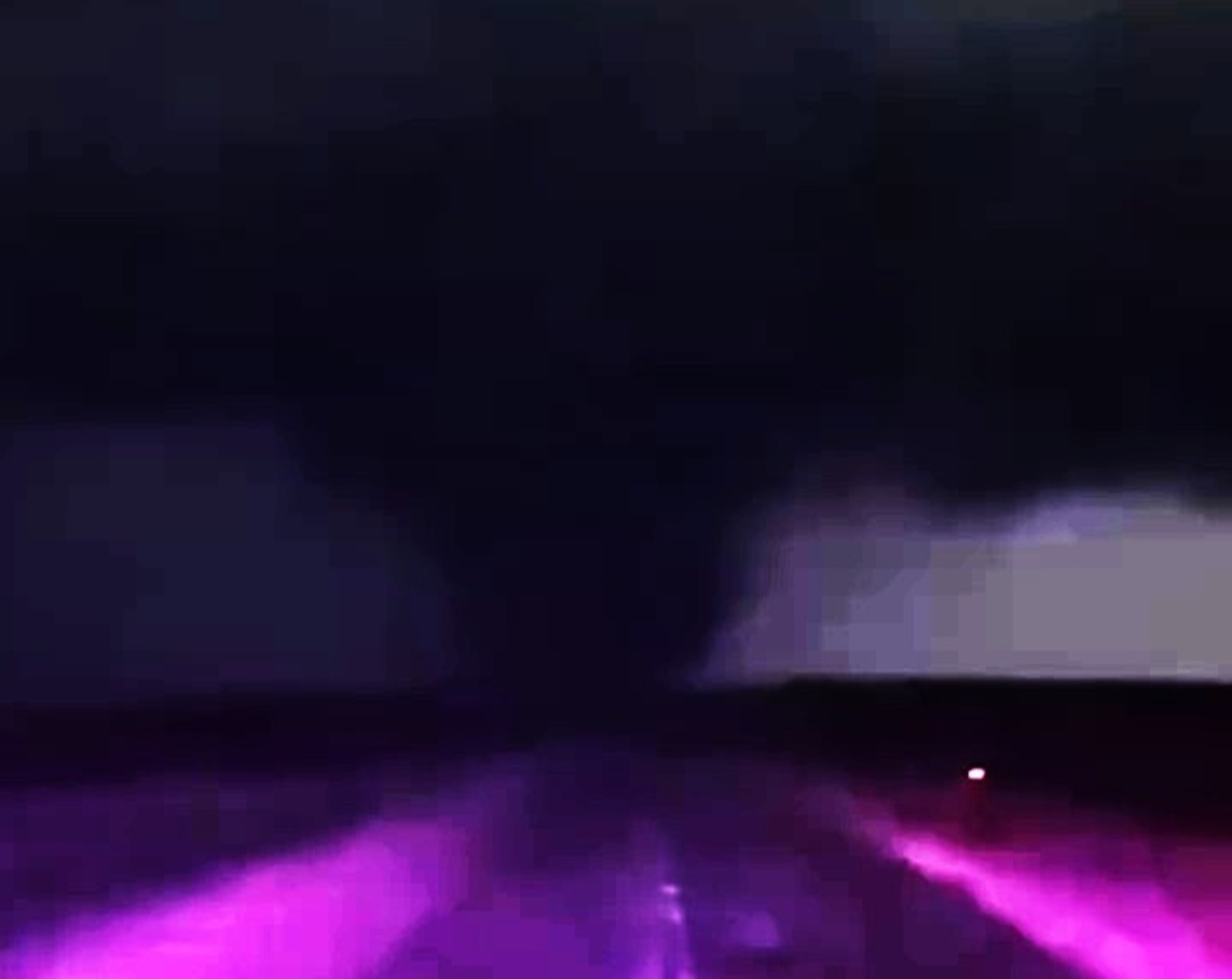
- The large tornado approaching Barnsdall

Meteorological history
- Formed: May 6, 2024, 9:12 p.m. CDT (UTC−05:00)
- Dissipated: May 6, 2024, 10:07 p.m. CDT (UTC−05:00)
- Duration: 55 minutes

EF4 tornado
- on the Enhanced Fujita scale
- Highest winds: 180 mph (290 km/h)

Overall effects
- Fatalities: 2
- Injuries: 33
- Damage: $25 million

This large and violent EF4 tornado first touched down at 9:12 p.m CDT (02:12 UTC) southeast of Hominy on CR-1701 and moved northeastward snapping trees at EF1 strength. As the tornado approached SH-20, it intensified to low-end EF2 strength, damaging the roof of a home and destroying two outbuildings. Past this point, the tornado rapidly strengthened to low-end EF3 intensity as it knocked over seven steel power poles and snapped trees. After the tornado had crossed SH-20, it weakened. It traveled through primarily rural areas at EF2 strength, and then EF1 strength. Hundreds of trees were snapped or uprooted, and outbuildings were damaged. At 9:39 p.m CDT (02:39 UTC), the National Weather Service in Tulsa, Oklahoma issued a Tornado Emergency for Barnsdall, after receiving reports of a large tornado and a large debris ball appearing on radar. As the tornado approached CR-2240, it regained EF2 strength and severe ground-scouring began. It then crossed Birch Lake, and further intensified to EF3 strength, continuing to destroy trees. As the tornado passed east of CR-2380, it became violent. It reached its peak intensity of EF4, with wind speeds estimated at 180 mph (290 km/h). A well-constructed home was swept clean off of its crawl space, and its debris was blown to the northeast. Nearby trees were completely stubbed and debarked, and vehicles were thrown and rolled. Continuing northeast, the tornado weakened slightly as it inflicted high-end EF3 damage to the NuCera Solutions wax plant on the southeast side of Barnsdall.

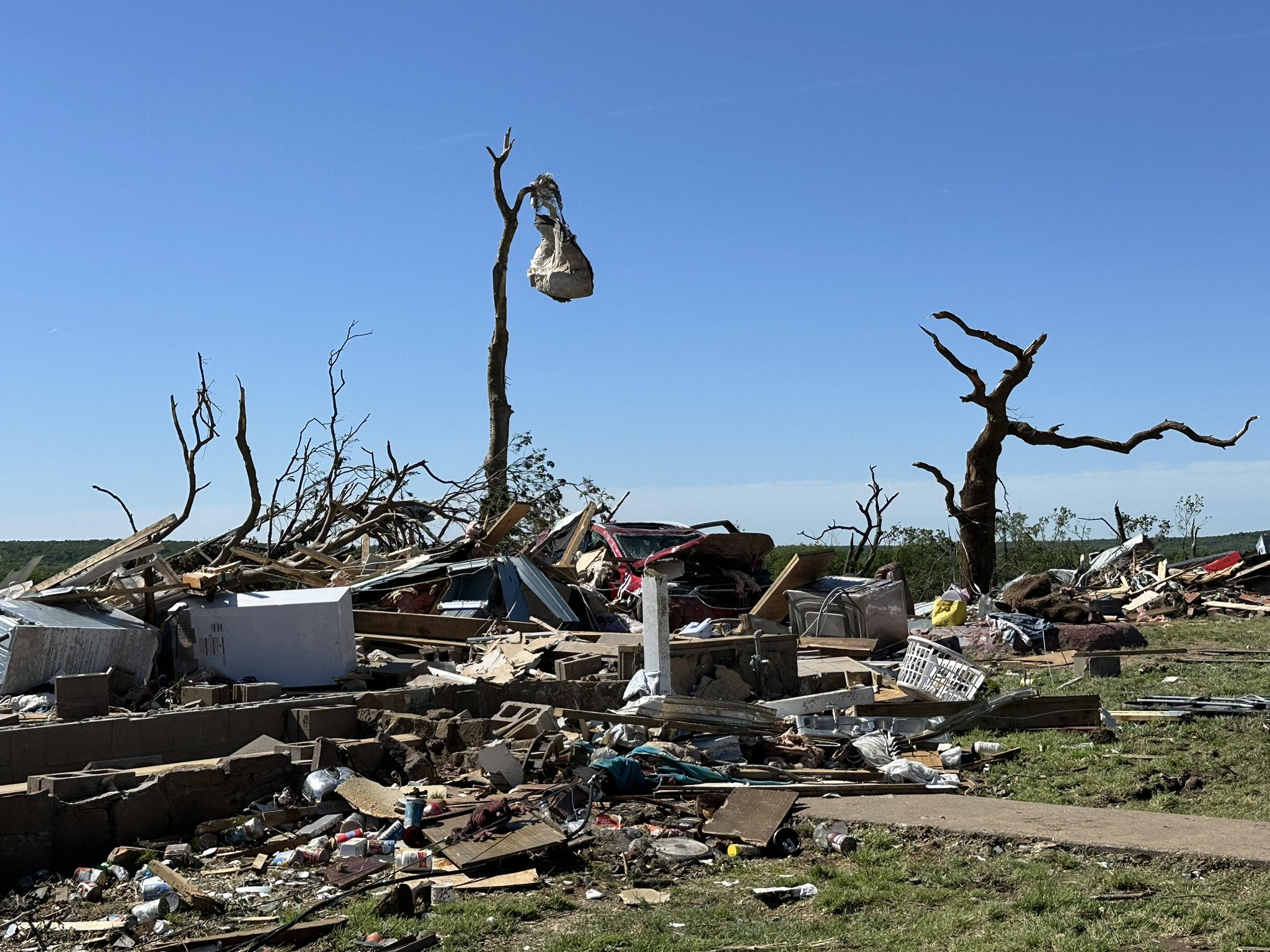
Low-end EF4 damage to a two-story home in Barnsdall, Oklahoma

The tornado then continued moving into the east side of town, where numerous homes sustained severe damage. One manufactured home was completely destroyed, resulting in a fatality. Another frame-home was completely destroyed, with a nearby well-constructed garage being destroyed as well, both structures earning high-end EF3 ratings. The second fatality occurred in this residence. Along 2nd St, the tornado strengthened to EF4 intensity again, completely destroying a two-story home. Wind speeds here were estimated at 170 mph (270 km/h). Past there, the tornado crossed SH-123 where it severely damaged numerous homes and metal buildings and completely destroyed a manufactured home at EF2-EF3 strength. This was the second time this part of Barnsdall had been hit by a tornado in 2024; an EF1 tornado had previously impacted the area on April 1.

Moving northeastward away from Barnsdall, the tornado weakened, but remained strong at EF1-EF2 strength as it caused significant tree damage, damaged homes, and destroyed outbuildings in more rural areas. The parent supercell also began to interact with a squall line that was coming from the west. The tornado then moved through the southern part of Bartlesville, where numerous homes and businesses suffered severe damage. The tornado then weakened to EF1 strength and crossed US 60 and US 75 east of Bartlesville, where it severely damaged a Hampton Inn there. The concrete walls of the hotel were speared with 2x4s as well. The nearby Gan's Mall had its newly-installed roof thrown across the road, which ended up trapping several people inside the Hampton Inn. The tornado then exited the town as the parent supercell became absorbed into the trailing squall line, which caused the tornado to dissipate northeast of the town near Dewey at 10:07 pm. CDT (03:07 UTC). The tornado was on the ground for approximately 55 minutes, traveling a total length of 40.81 miles (65.68 km), reaching a peak width of 1,700 yards (1,600 m) at times. Along with the two fatalities, 33 other people were injured and the tornado caused $25 million in damage.

=== Columbia, Tennessee ===
Columbia, Tennessee
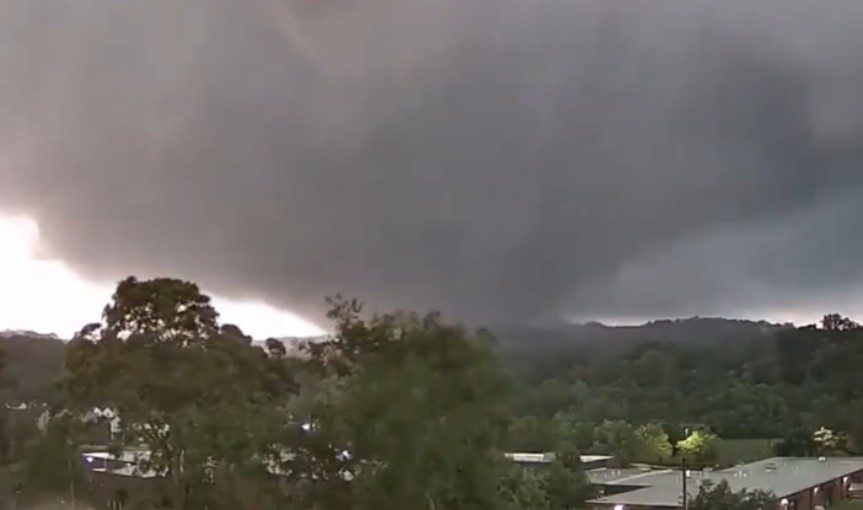
- An automated camera still of the tornado shortly after its formation

Meteorological history
- Formed: May 8, 2024, 5:37 p.m. CDT (UTC−05:00)
- Dissipated: May 8, 2024, 6:07 p.m. CDT (UTC−05:00)
- Duration: 30 minutes

EF3 tornado
- on the Enhanced Fujita scale
- Highest winds: 140 mph (230 km/h)

Overall effects
- Fatalities: 1
- Injuries: 12
- Damage: $10 million

This deadly low-end EF3 tornado first touched down at 5:37 pm. CDT (22:37 UTC) on Lofton Road just east of the Duck River in the eastern part of Columbia in Maury County, causing light tree damage with some limbs being broken. Strengthening ensued as it moved northeast, damaging some homes and collapsing roofs on some residences before snapping tree trunks near Mt Oliver Road at EF1 intensity. The tornado then moved northwest of Beech Grove, damaging more houses and collapsing roofs and ripping roof panels off of homes at EF1 intensity. More tree trunks were snapped as it moved through forested regions and across US 412/SR 99, before the tornado reached EF2 strength along Old Highway 99. EF2 damage was observed further northeast, including an outbuilding that was totally destroyed by the tornado, with walls collapsed inward. Continuing onward, the tornado then intensified to its peak of low-end EF3 intensity as it moved into the Lasea community. It bent and collapsed large transmission power trusses, mostly destroyed two homes, which were left with only their interior rooms standing, and obliterated a mobile home. One person was killed in one of the destroyed homes. EF2 damage was noted nearby further north where two houses had their roofs and walls destroyed. By this time, a tornado emergency had been issued for the eastern portions of Columbia as a debris ball was evident on radar and storm spotters reported a large, significant tornado on the ground.

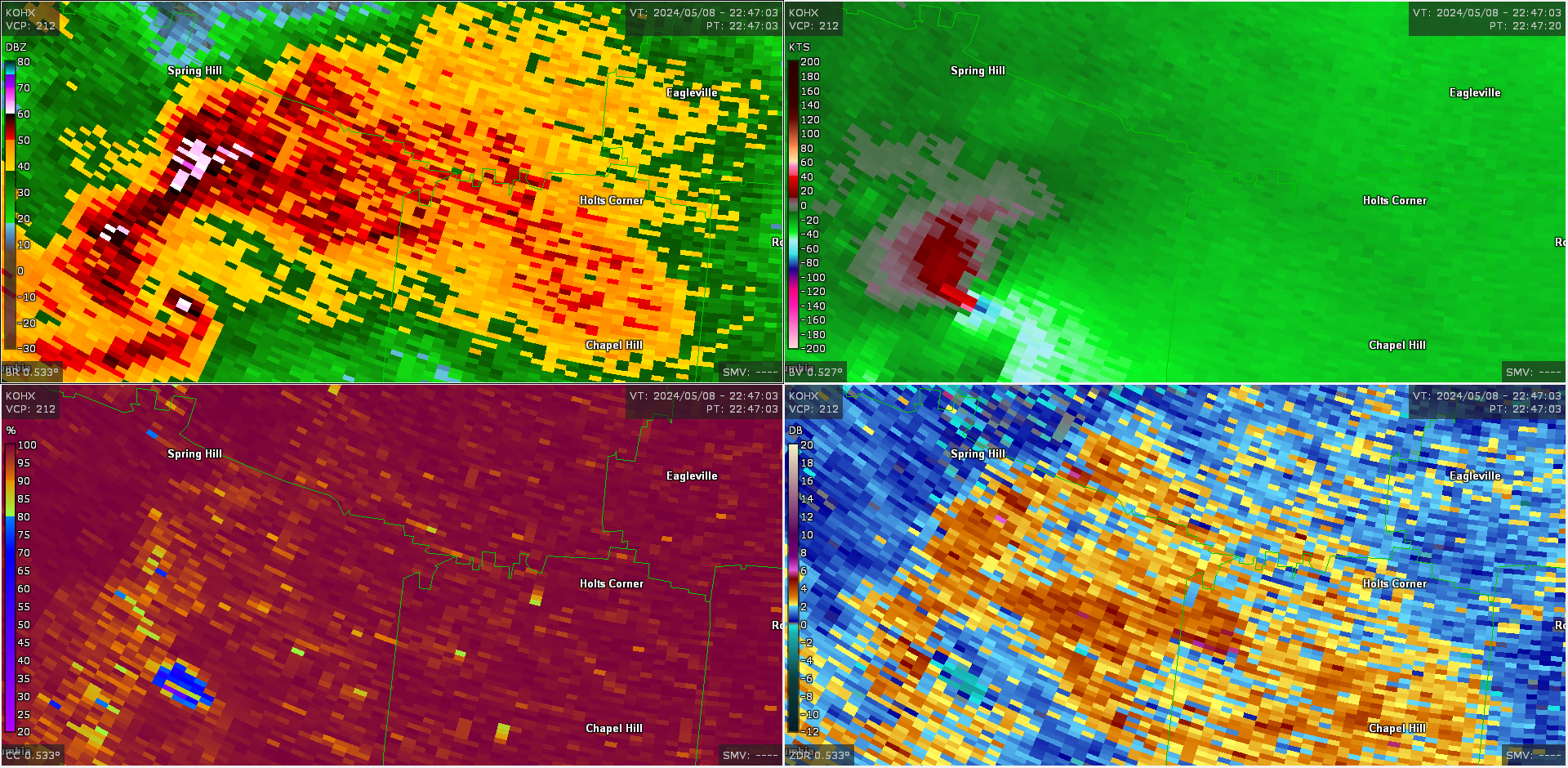
NEXRAD radar scan of the Columbia, Tennessee EF3 tornado.

The tornado then weakened some to EF2 intensity as it approached and then crossed I-65, damaging nearby houses as well. The tornado also turned in a more easterly direction at this point as well as it snapped numerous tree trunks at Joe Brown Road. The tornado then moved through mostly open areas before re-intensifying to high-end EF2 strength as it ripped and collapsed more roofs of houses and destroying a nearby barn. A carport was also destroyed, and metal power poles were bent. Approaching and then passing through the small town of Rally Hill, the tornado weakened, but still caused low-end EF2 damage in the community. A house that was under construction as well an outbuilding were destroyed, another home and outbuilding were damaged, and trees and power poles were snapped. The tornado then began a rapid weakening trend after crossing US 431 and wobbling southeastward slightly, snapping trees at EF1 intensity. The tornado then turned eastward and entered Marshall County at EF0 strength, uprooting trees and causing minor roof damage to an outbuilding before dissipating at 6:07 pm. CDT (23:07 UTC) southwest of Lunns Store.

This tornado was on the ground for 30 minutes, traveling a total length of 12.94 miles (20.82 km), and reaching a peak width of 900 yards (820 m). One person died as a result of the tornado, 12 others were injured, and the tornado caused $10 million in damage.

=== Pisgah–Henagar–Hammondville, Alabama ===
Pisgah–Henagar–Hammondville, Alabama
- The tornado illuminated by lightning near Henagar, Alabama

Meteorological history
- Formed: May 8, 2024, 10:57 p.m. CDT (UTC−05:00)
- Dissipated: May 8, 2024, 11:24 p.m. CDT (UTC−05:00)
- Duration: 27 minutes

EF3 tornado
- on the Enhanced Fujita scale
- Highest winds: 140 mph (230 km/h)

Overall effects
- Fatalities: 0
- Injuries: 7

This intense tornado touched down along SR 71 south of Pisgah in Jackson County at 10:57 pm CDT (03:57 UTC). It moved east-southeastward at EF1 strength, snapping trees and inflicting minor roof damage to farm building. Another EF1 tornado would pass through this area about seven hours later, causing additional damage. This tornado then intensified and widened significantly as it reached County Road 422, overturning a camper, partially destroying a well-built home, destroying a horse trailer and a mobile home, and removing a third of the roof from a hay barn. Debris was thrown into the field across the street and 2x4s were impaled 1–1.5 feet (0.30–0.46 m) into the ground. Two people were injured in the camper. Along SR 40, several large 100+-year-old oak trees with diameters of 4–5 feet (1.2–1.5 m) were knocked down, including some that fell on and knocked down two exterior walls of a home, which also had its windows sucked out. The tornado then reached its widest point and ripped a garage clean from the home it was attached to with the resulting debris shearing the home. This home was anchored with nails instead of bolts and a high-end EF2 rating was applied to this structure. Just beyond this point, the tornado reached its peak intensity of low-end EF3 along County Road 125. A well-built and well-anchored metal shop building was completely destroyed with the large bolts and plates that anchored the H-beams being snapped and bent. A large 4–5-foot (1.2–1.5 m) section of the foundation was ripped from the ground with debris being scattered about 10 feet (3.0 m), although the column anchoring remained intact. A nearby 20,000 lb (9,100 kg) 18-wheeler cab was tossed more than 150 yards (140 m) into a field across CR 125. Other nearby semi-trailers were shifted 50–100 feet (15–30 m) as well. Around this time, a tornado emergency was issued for Henagar, Hammondville, and Mentone.

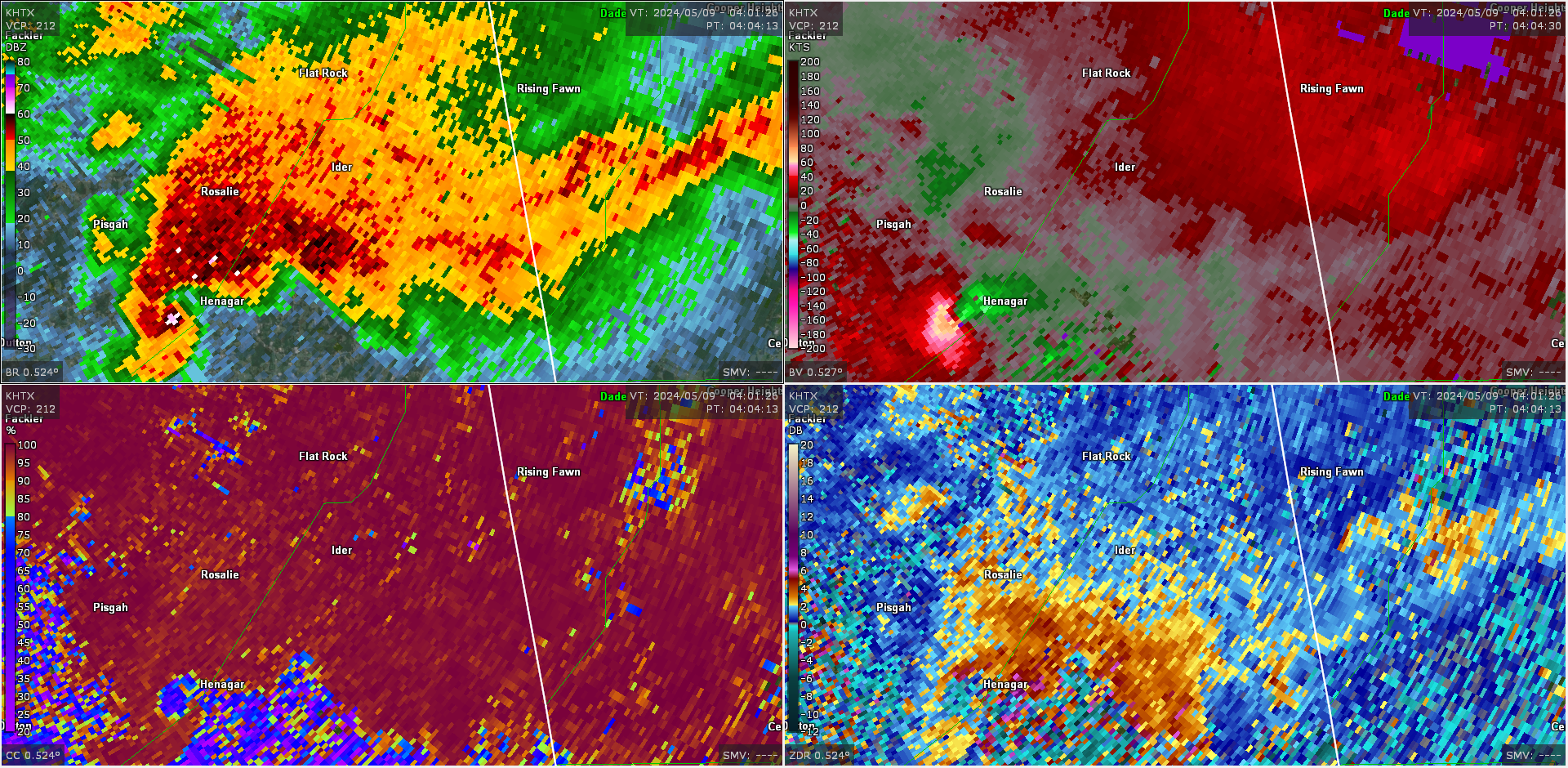
NEXRAD radar scan of the Henagar, Alabama EF3 tornado.

The tornado then weakened to EF1 strength, snapping and uprooting trees and destroying outbuildings. Along SR 75 south of Henagar, a large outbuilding was unroofed, a smaller one was completely shifted off its foundation, another camper was overturned, power poles were snapped, and trees were snapped or uprooted. Between SR 75 and SR 40, the tornado turned eastward and briefly reached high-end EF2 intensity again, obliterating a mobile home, heavily damaging an outbuilding, and snapping and uprooting trees. The tornado then moved along SR 40 at EF1 intensity, peeling back tin on several chicken houses, including one that collapsed, snapped or uprooted more trees, and damaged the roofs of homes. After damaging another mobile home, the tornado steadily weakened causing only sporadic outbuilding and tree damage before dissipating as it crossed SR 117 just before reaching the city limits of Hammondville and I-59 at 11:24 pm CDT (04:24 UTC). The tornado traveled 12.34 miles (19.86 km) and reached a peak width of 0.5 miles (0.80 km). Seven people were injured.

=== Tallahassee, Florida ===
==== First tornado ====
Tallahassee, Florida
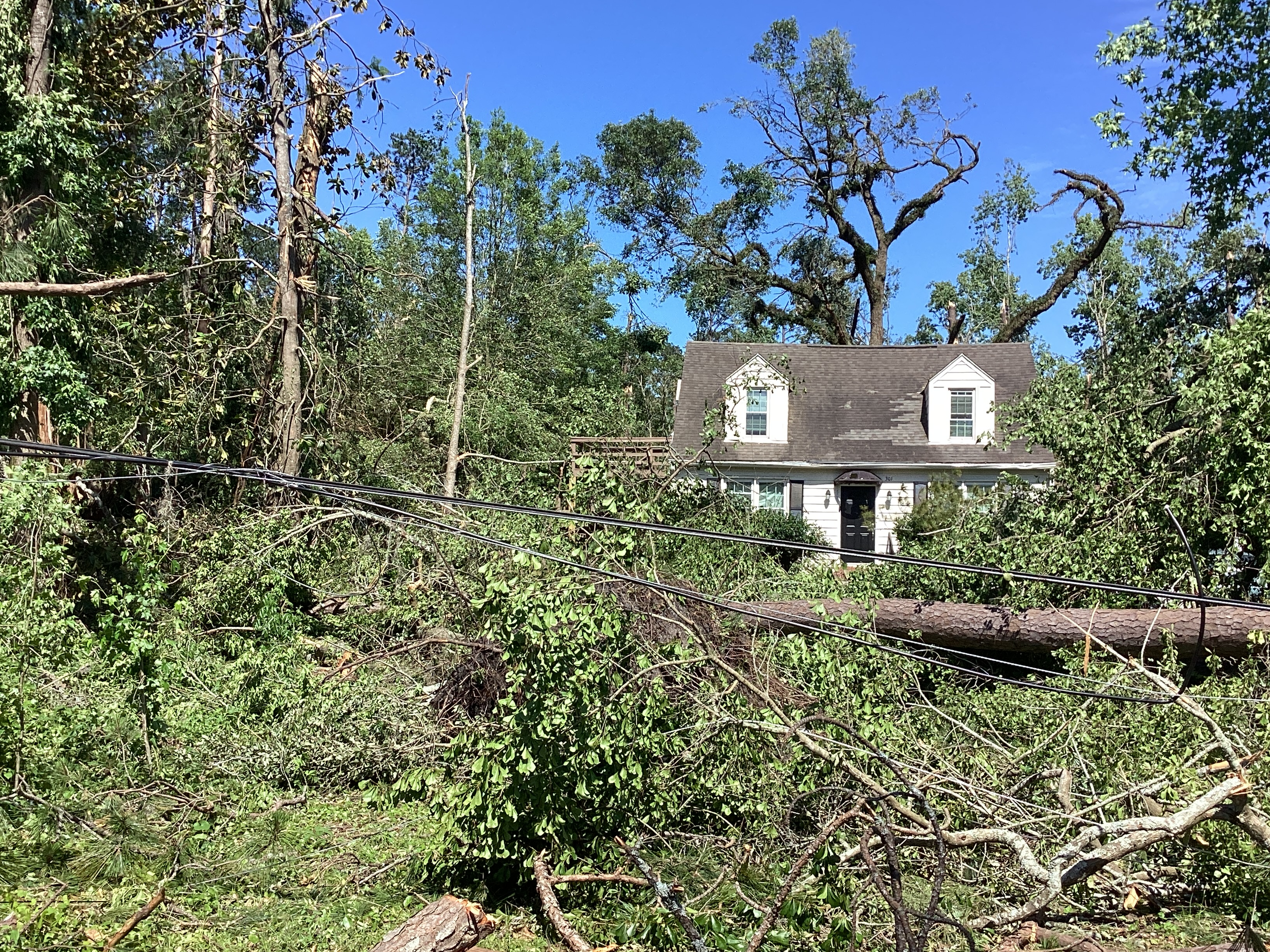
- Low-end EF2 tree damage in Tallahassee

Meteorological history
- Formed: May 10, 2024, 6:38 a.m. EDT (UTC−04:00)
- Dissipated: May 10, 2024, 7:03 a.m. EDT (UTC−04:00)
- Duration: 25 minutes

EF2 tornado
- on the Enhanced Fujita scale
- Highest winds: 115 mph (185 km/h)

Overall effects
- Fatalities: 0
- Injuries: 0
- Damage: $92.07 million

This tornado first touched down at 6:38 am. EDT in Gadsden County, Florida east of Wetumpka, and was the first of three to impact Leon County that morning. After damaging an old farm building, the tornado tracked east-southeastward at EF1 intensity, snapping or uprooting numerous trees as it passed just south of Midway through rural areas. The tornado then crossed the Ochlockonee River into Leon County, continuing to cause EF1 tree damage as it passed through Ochlockonee as it tracked along US 90. A mobile home park had extensive tree damage, with several trees falling on mobile homes. The tornado then entered the western city limits of Tallahassee near the intersection of US 90 and SR 263 and turned southeastward, causing roof and siding damage to a hotel and shopping center. After crossing SR 263, the tornado intensified to low-end EF2 strength as it approached and crossed SR 20. A swath of pine trees was snapped at about 75 feet (23 m) above the ground, and an automotive repair building was heavily damaged. After inflicting significant EF1 tree damage on the Lively Technical College and Tallahassee Community College campuses, the tornado briefly reached low-end EF2 intensity again as it passed over a neighborhood, where another area of intense tree damage was noted with numerous homes damaged by fallen trees. The tornado then began to move through densely populated areas, causing widespread EF1 tree damage through several neighborhoods. Numerous homes and businesses were damaged by fallen trees, especially along SR 366. The tornado then moved through the southwestern part of the Florida State University campus, continuing to down numerous trees. The tent housing the FSU Flying High Circus was destroyed, and the outfield fence at Dick Howser Stadium was severely damaged. Turning back to an east-southeastward heading and moving into Downtown Tallahassee along Gaines Street, the tornado collapsed a construction crane and inflicted major damage to businesses. Multiple warehouses in Railroad Square suffered severe damage, and the railroad depot sustained roof damage. The tornado then began to interact with another EF2 tornado that was ongoing to its south, causing this tornado to turn back to the southeast. It missed the Florida State Capitol to the south, continuing to snap trees in residential areas, parks, and a country club and blowing down street signs before rapidly weakening and dissipating at 7:03 am. EDT, as the other EF2 tornado to its south became the dominant circulation. The storm that caused this tornado, as well as the one that overtook it, was responsible for an area of wind gusts potentially exceeding 100 mph (160 km/h) in southern Tallahassee.

This tornado traveled 19.58 miles (31.51 km) and reached a peak width of 900 yards (820 m), causing $92 million in damage.

==== Second tornado ====
Tallahassee, Florida
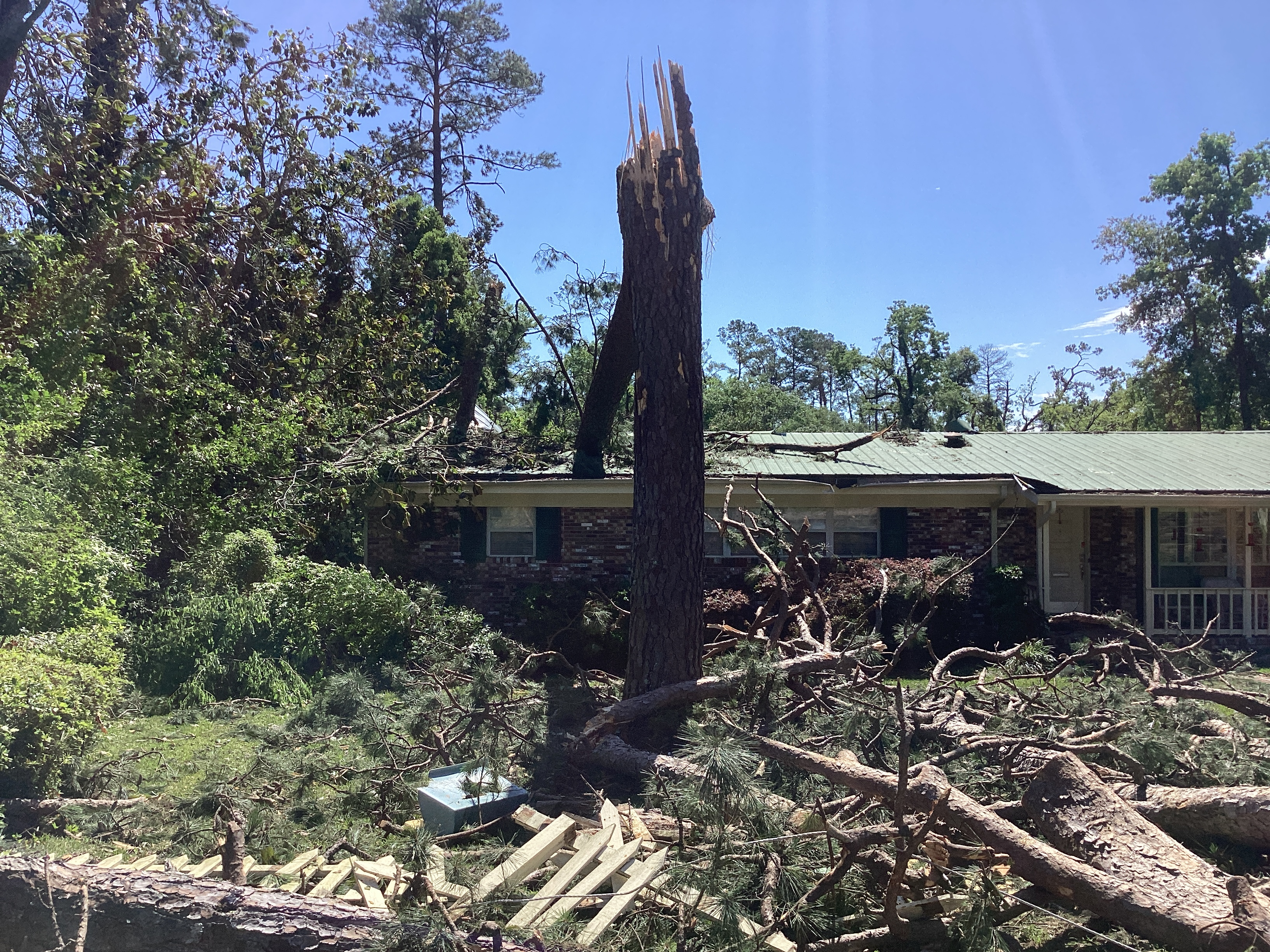
- Low-end EF2 damage to a tree that was snapped and fell onto a nearby home in Tallahassee

Meteorological history
- Formed: May 10, 2024, 6:50 a.m. EDT (UTC−04:00)
- Dissipated: May 10, 2024, 7:14 a.m. EDT (UTC−04:00)
- Duration: 24 minutes

EF2 tornado
- on the Enhanced Fujita scale
- Highest winds: 115 mph (185 km/h)

Overall effects
- Fatalities: 2
- Injuries: 0
- Damage: $92.10 million

As the first EF2 tornado was approaching Tallahassee, a second, even larger and longer-tracked EF2 tornado developed in Lake Talquin State Park in Leon County at 6:50 am EDT. It was the third of three simultaneous tornadoes in Leon County, as an EF1 tornado was already ongoing to the south of this tornado. At the beginning of its path, the tornado snapped numerous trees and a power pole at EF1 intensity as it moved east-southeastward. As it reached SR 20, the tornado made a sharp turn and began moving due east along the highway, continuing to snap numerous trees as it moved through the Lake Talquin State Recreational Area. The tornado then veered back to the east-southeast away from SR 20 and impacted many subdivisions in the Norfleet neighborhood, leaving behind a large area of snapped trees. Turning back eastward and moving into the southern part of Tallahassee, the tornado crossed SR 263, continuing to snap dozens of trees along with wooden power poles. The tornado then began to move generally eastward through neighborhoods in the southwest part of the city, snapping and uprooting countless trees, snapping power poles, damaging an elementary school, and inflicting roof damage to homes, outbuildings, and other structures. Some homes were damaged by fallen trees as well. Around this time, a swath of damaging 100 mph (160 km/h) straight-line winds developed just south of this tornado. This area of destructive winds would continue to parallel this tornado until it dissipated. The tornado then moved through the Florida A&M University campus, producing widespread EF1 tree damage, with two university buildings also being damaged. Power poles and lines were taken down by fallen trees as well. The tornado reached its peak width in this area, and a much larger area of EF0 shingle damage to homes and businesses was noted as it crossed SR 363. The first Tallahassee tornado then merged with this tornado as it moved over the Capital City Country Club, and this tornado became the dominant tornadic circulation as it continued through Tallahassee. After leaving the golf course, the tornado reached low-end EF2 intensity as it impacted the Indian Head Acres subdivisions, snapping trees at about 75 feet (23 m) above the ground. Fallen trees also damaged homes, power poles, and power lines. The tornado continued eastward, causing EF1 tree damage throughout several subdivisions as it crossed US 319 and exited Tallahassee. After crossing CR 2195 east of Tallahassee, the tornado weakened to EF0 intensity uprooting a few trees along US 27 as it crossed into Jefferson County before dissipating at 7:14 am EDT.

Along its 24-minute journey, the tornado traveled 27.22 mi (43.81 km) and reached a peak width of 1,400 yd (1,300 m). The tornado killed two people and caused $92.1 million in damage.

== Non-tornadic effects ==
Strong straight-line winds blew a tree down on a car east of Lone Mountain, Tennessee, killing the driver. One person was killed and another person was injured after a tree fell on a vehicle in Gaston County, North Carolina on May 8. One occurred in Jackson County, Illinois, as a mobile home was shifted off its foundation and a trailer was flipped there, while two people were injured after a warehouse had its roof collapse in Knox County, Tennessee. Severe storms also forced a Major League Baseball game at Busch Stadium to be postponed until August 5. The same system later produced extensive straight-line wind damage in Mississippi and Florida, Tallahassee was particularly hard hit, with tens of thousands of power outages still affecting residents days later.

== Impacts ==
Waffle Houses in the Oklahoma City metro closed on May 6th due to the risk of tornadoes. Amtrak's northbound Heartland Flyer was canceled on May 6 as a precautionary measure due to the high risk of severe weather issued by the Storm Prediction Center; retroactively, the southbound train for May 7 was also canceled. Wolverine trains from the evening of May 7 to the early morning hours of May 8 were also delayed between Ann Arbor and Battle Creek, Michigan due to tornadic activity in the area. On May 8, the Nashville International Airport briefly issued a ground stop due to severe storms. Further north, Mammoth Caves National Park shut down at 3:30 pm on May 8 due to the storm, re-opening on May 9.

== Aftermath ==
Management at the NuCera Solution wax plant in Barnsdall, Oklahoma, which was severely damaged by the tornado, had initially been planning to rebuild the structure. However, the plant announced in late-July 2024 that it would permanently close within the next 6–12 months.

== See also ==
- Weather of 2024
- List of North American tornadoes and tornado outbreaks
- List of F4 and EF4 tornadoes
  - List of F4 and EF4 tornadoes (2020–present)
- Research history of tornadoes
- List of United States tornadoes in May 2024
