= 2024 Barnsdall tornado =

EF4 tornado in Oklahoma, US

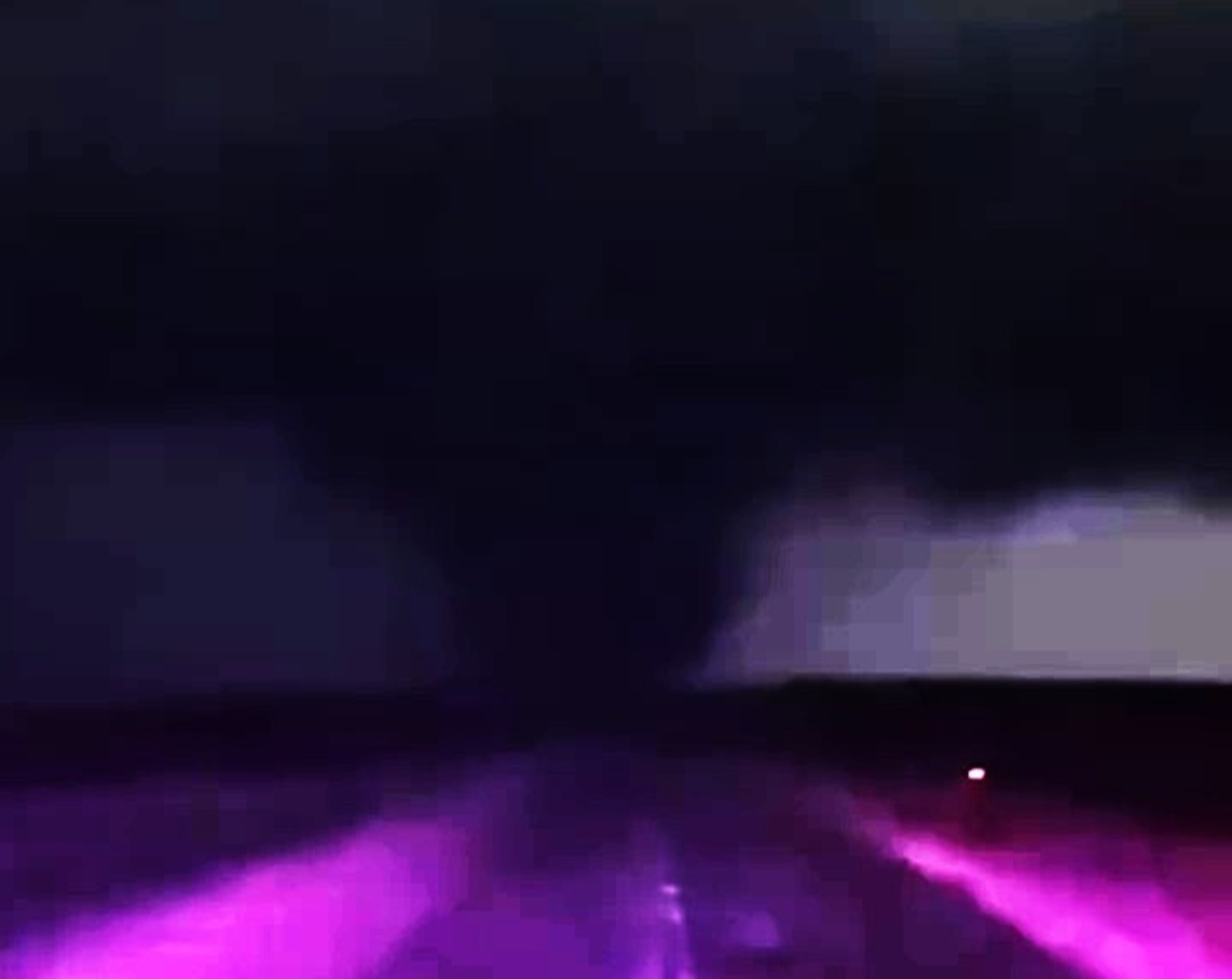
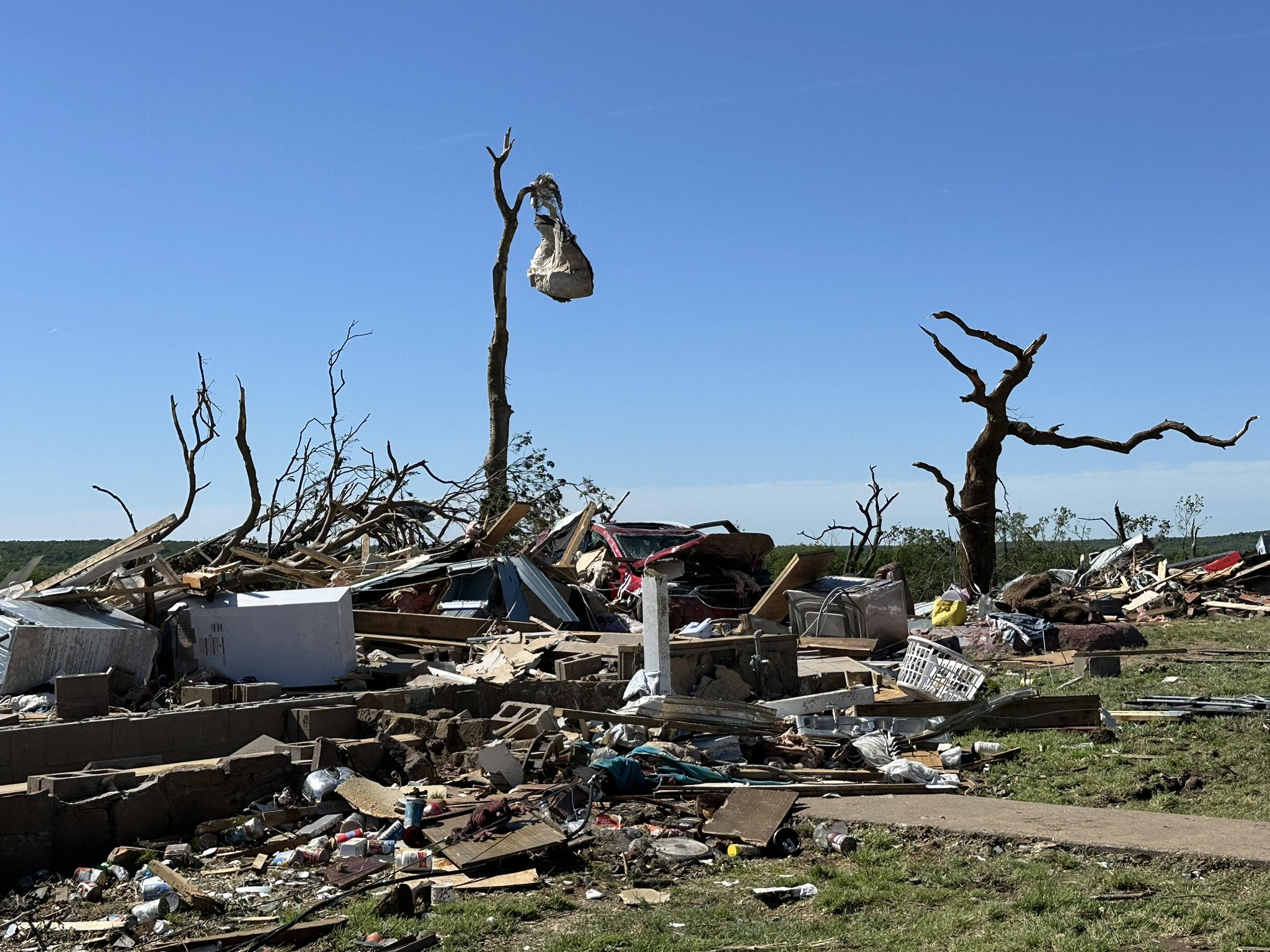
- Clockwise: The tornado approaching Barnsdall as viewed by a highway patrol officer, EF4 damage to a 2-story house along Second Street in Barnsdall, radar loop of the tornado seen on NEXRAD radar as it moved through Barnsdall and Bartlesville.

Meteorological history
- Formed: May 6, 2024, 9:12 p.m. CDT (UTC−05:00)
- Dissipated: May 6, 2024, 10:07 p.m. CDT (UTC−05:00)
- Duration: 55 minutes

EF4 tornado
- on the Enhanced Fujita scale
- Max width: 1,700 yards (0.97 mi; 1.6 km)
- Path length: 40.80 miles (65.66 km)
- Highest winds: 180 mph (290 km/h)

Overall effects
- Fatalities: 2
- Injuries: 33
- Damage: $25 million (2024 USD)
- Areas affected: Osage and Washington counties; particularly Barnsdall and Bartlesville, Oklahoma, United States
- Part of the Tornado outbreak of May 6–10, 2024 and Tornadoes of 2024

In the evening hours of May 6, 2024, a large and destructive EF4 tornado moved through the communities of Barnsdall and Bartlesville in the state of Oklahoma, prompting a tornado emergency to be issued for both towns. The tornado was part of a larger outbreak of severe weather across the Great Plains. The tornado inflicted EF4 damage to eastern portions of Barnsdall before moving through central Bartlesville where it produced moderate damage. The tornado killed two people, injured thirty-three more, and inflicted an estimated total of $25 million (2024 USD) in damage along a 40.8-mile (65.7 km) path. The tornado was the third to be rated EF4 in 2024, and was part of the most active year for tornadoes in Oklahoma history.

== Meteorological synopsis ==
Storm Prediction Center outlooks on May 6, 2024

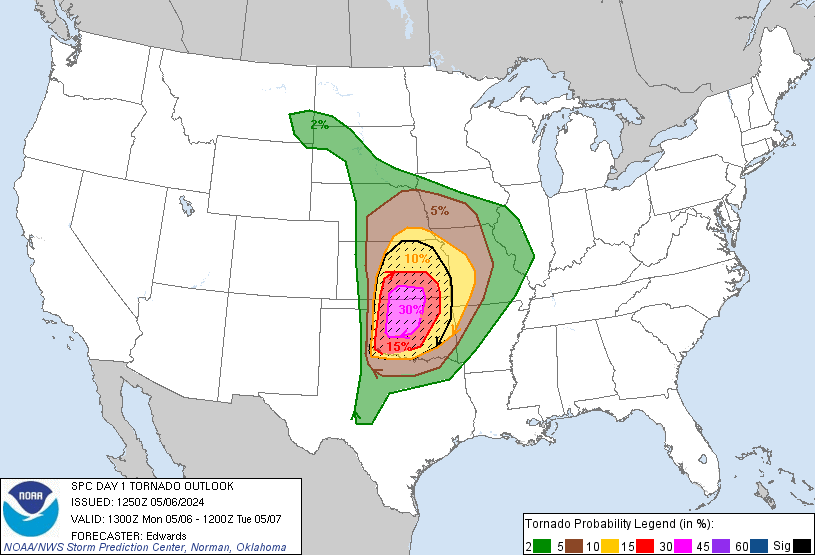
Day 1 tornado outlooks.

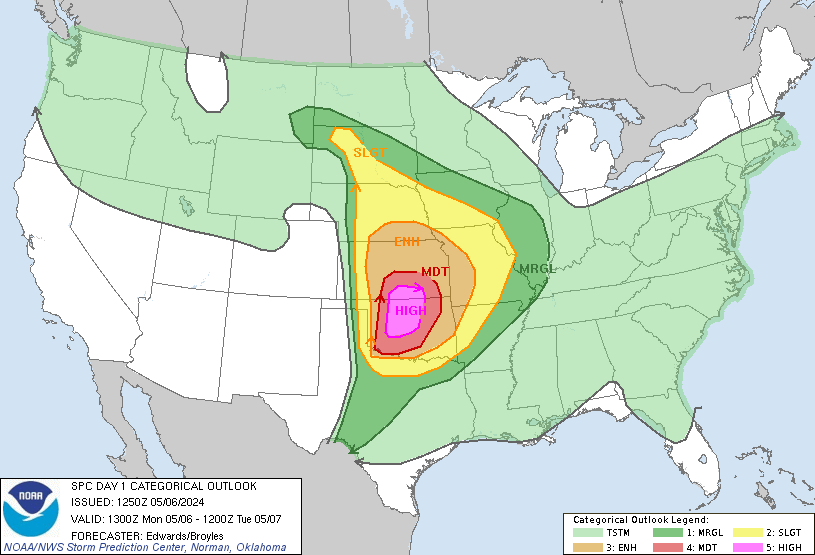
Day 1 categorical outlooks.

At 1630Z on May 6, 2024, the Storm Prediction Center, noting severe activity in Tennessee as well as confidence in cells further south within Oklahoma, issued a new convective outlook, which expanded the high-risk area further south, the moderate risk further east, and added a marginal risk over the Tennessee Valley. This notably mentioned the presence of mixed-layer CAPE values between 2,500 and 4,500 j/kg across central and northern Oklahoma into southern Kansas, as severe activity was set to peak through the night, and at 2 pm, a particularly dangerous situation tornado watch was issued, noting the probability of 2 or more tornadoes at >95%, and at least 1 significant tornado at 90%.

At 300Z, an observed sounding from the National Weather Service office in Norman, Oklahoma indicated an incredibly favorable environment for supercellular tornadoes, with mixed-layer CAPE values over 3,500 j/kg as well as strong wind shear and lapse rates, with a formulated Significant Tornado Parameter (STP) of 14.9. One hour earlier, a powerful supercell dropped the Barnsdall tornado.

=== April 1 tornado ===
In the evening hours of April 1, 2024, an EF1 tornado would move through parts of eastern Barnsdall, impacting areas that would be hit by the EF4 tornado five weeks later. The tornado touched down at 8:38 p.m CDT (01:38 UTC) east of South 5th Street, damaging trees at EF1 intensity along West Chestnut Avenue and deroofing a home on West Walnut Avenue. The tornado continued to move to the east, damaging more structures as it crossed Bird Creek. The tornado weakened as it moved over County Road 2402, lifting three minutes after touching down.

== Tornado summary ==
The tornado first touched down at 9:12 p.m CDT (02:12 UTC) southeast of Hominy on County Road 1701 and moved northeastward snapping trees at EF1 strength. The tornado retained low intensity as it passed over County Road 1625, but rapidly intensified over SH-20, bending concrete poles at EF3 intensity. After the tornado crossed SH-20, it weakened. The tornado remained over rural portions of Osage County, tracking through farmland before hitting County Road 2605 at EF1 strength. EF2-rated damage was found on County Road 2130, where the tornado snapped trees before weakening as it neared Barnsdall. It would again intensify as it neared town, further snapping trees at EF2 intensity and later debarking trees near Birch Lake, an indicator of EF3 strength.

=== Impact in Barnsdall ===
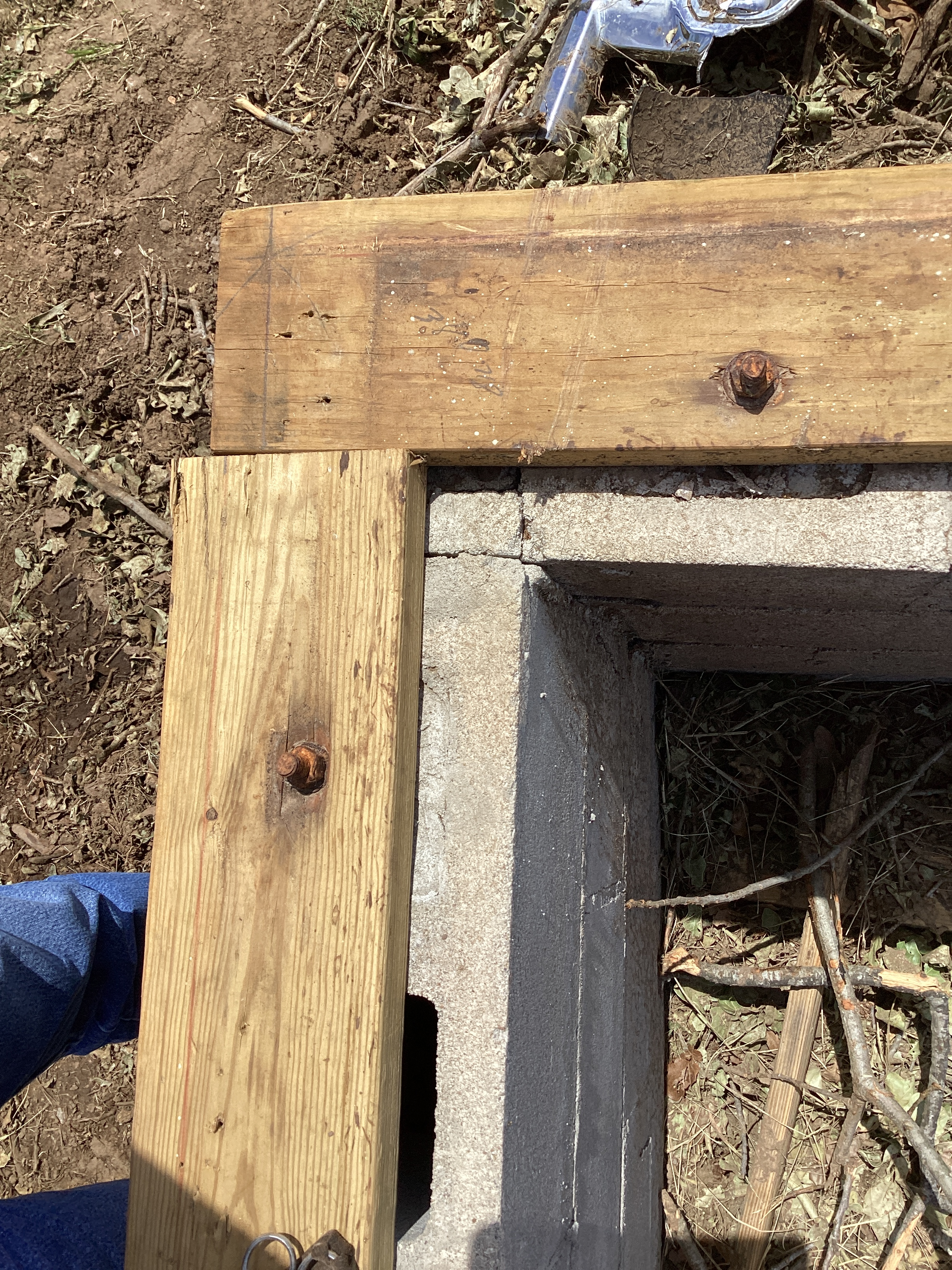
EF4-rated damage southwest of Barnsdall, Oklahoma

The tornado emergency issued for Barnsdall

The tornado became violent along County Road 2380, where a home was obliterated at EF4 strength; the foundation of the home was visible. At this location, it was determined that the tornado attained 180 mph (290 km/h)-peak wind speeds. A well-constructed home was swept clean off its crawl space, and its debris was blown to the northeast. Nearby trees were completely stubbed and debarked, and vehicles were thrown and rolled. Continuing northeast, the tornado weakened slightly as it inflicted high-end EF3 damage to the NuCera Solutions wax plant on the southeast side of Barnsdall. The tornado retained EF3 strength as it barreled through the eastern side of Barnsdall, where several homes would be completely destroyed. One person was killed along County Road 2402 as the tornado obliterated the home they were sheltering in. Another frame-home was completely destroyed in the area, with a nearby well-constructed garage being destroyed as well, both structures earning high-end EF3 ratings. The second fatality occurred in this residence. EF4 damage was inflicted to at least one home located on the corner of North 2nd Street and County Road 2402. Wind speeds at this location were estimated to have been as high as 170 mph (270 km/h). Past there, the tornado crossed SH-123, where it severely damaged numerous homes and metal buildings and completely destroyed a manufactured home at EF2-EF3 strength. St. Mary's Church, located in Barnsdall, sustained heavy damage as the tornado impacted the town. The tornado scoured dirt from the ground as it neared and moved through Barnsdall, which was visible on satellite imagery following the event. Over 40 homes were destroyed in Barnsdall.

=== Track through Bartlesville ===
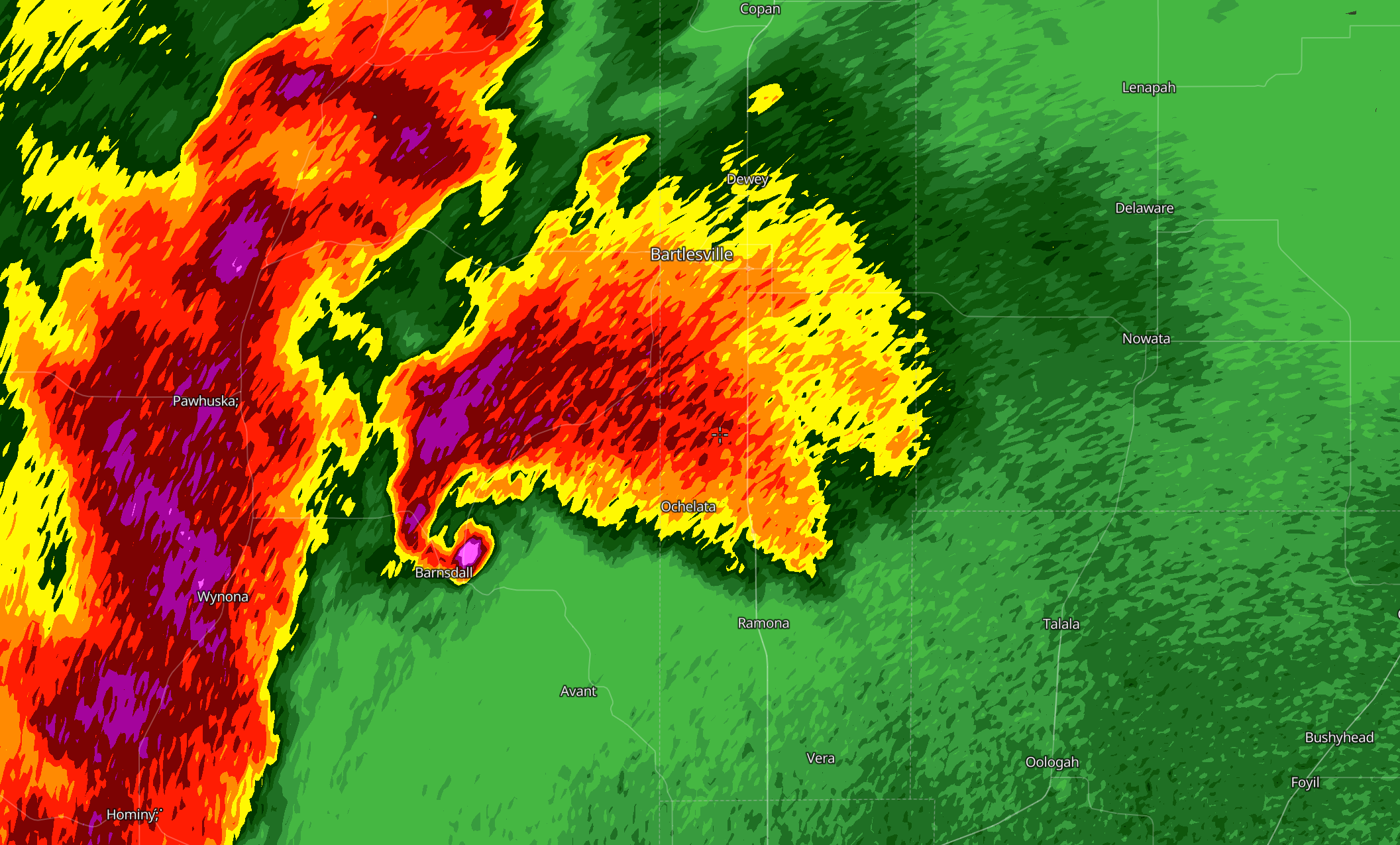
NEXRAD radar scan of the tornado approaching Bartlesville

Moving northeastward away from Barnsdall, the tornado weakened, but remained strong at EF1-EF2 strength as it caused significant tree damage, damaged homes, and destroyed outbuildings in more rural areas. The parent supercell also began to interact with a squall line that was coming from the west. The tornado then moved through the southern part of Bartlesville, where numerous homes and businesses suffered severe damage. Despite directly impacting the town, no fatalities or major injuries were reported. The tornado then weakened to EF1 strength and crossed US 60 and US 75 east of Bartlesville, where it severely damaged a Hampton Inn. At least one person inside of the Inn took a video of the tornado as it hit the building. The concrete walls of the hotel were speared with 2x4s as well. A family photo picked up by the tornado in Bartlesville was found over 21 miles away.

The nearby Gan's Mall had its newly installed roof thrown across the road, which ended up trapping several people inside the Hampton Inn. The tornado then exited the town as the parent supercell became absorbed into the trailing squall line, which caused the tornado to dissipate northeast of the town near Dewey at 10:07 pm. CDT (03:07 UTC). The tornado was on the ground for approximately 55 minutes, traveling a total length of 40.81 miles (65.68 km), reaching a peak width of 1,700 yards (1,600 m) at times. Along with the two fatalities, 33 other people were injured and the tornado caused $25 million in damage.

== Aftermath ==
In all, two people were killed by the tornado, both in the Barnsdall area. A firefighter in Barnsdall was taken to a hospital for chest pains, one of eight people injured in the town. The tornado inflicted an estimated total of $25 million (2024 USD) along its 40.8-mile (65.7 km) track, and destroyed over 100 utility poles. Oklahoma Senator Bill Coleman stated "This was one of the worst tornadoes I’ve ever seen, and my heart goes out to the Oklahomans waking up this morning to assess the damage and destruction to their homes and businesses" while touring damage caused by the tornado. Following the tornado, a large natural gas leak took place in the city limits of Barnsdall. It was the second of two EF4 tornadoes to occur during the 2024 tornado season in Oklahoma, with another violent tornado occurring 9 days prior in Marietta.

Deaths from the Barnsdall-Bartlesville tornado
| Name | Age | Town | Ref. |
|---|---|---|---|
| Wayne Hogue | 81 | Barnsdall | |
| Rhonda Hayman | 53 | Barnsdall | |

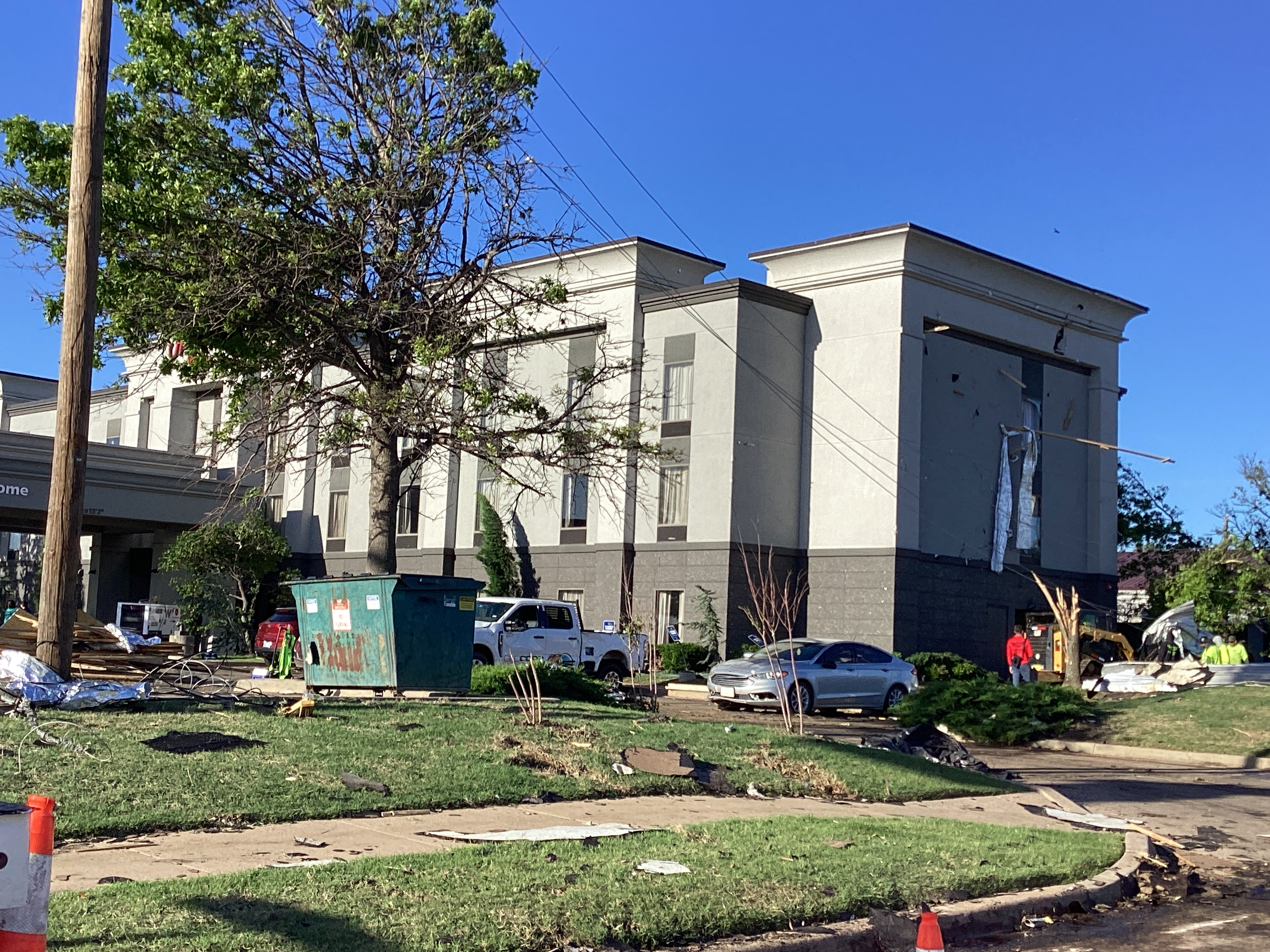
EF1 damage to a Hampton Inn that was speared by 2x4s in Bartlesville, Oklahoma.

Several companies, including The Salvation Army, helped with recovery efforts following the tornado.

=== Bartlesville Hampton Inn video ===
In the days following the event, a viral TikTok video circulated around the internet, showing guests running to take cover as the tornado struck a Hampton Inn located in Bartlesville. The video shows two men standing under the hotel awning as the tornado approaches, although at that point in its life the tornado was rain-wrapped, and as a result was nearly invisible. After realizing that the tornado was about to strike the hotel, the men run inside and shelter under the hotel's desk as the lights in the hotel shut off. Several people in the hotel were trapped immediately following the tornado and had to be rescued, although no deaths were reported in the hotel.

=== Oklahoma Town Of Barnsdall Hit By Deadly Tornado ===
Oklahoma Town Of Barnsdall Hit By Deadly Tornado
- Image restricted due to copyright
- View photograph

Oklahoma Town Of Barnsdall Hit By Deadly Tornado is a photograph by Getty Images photographer Brandon Bell, showing a child walking alone through a neighborhood damaged by the tornado. CNN published that this was one of "the most visually powerful and important" photographs during 2024.

== See also ==
- List of F4, EF4, and IF4 tornadoes (2020–present)
- List of tornadoes in the outbreak of May 6–10, 2024
