= Sulphur Springs, Crawford County, Indiana =

Unincorporated community in Indiana, U.S.

Coordinates: 38°12′43″N 86°28′30″W

Sulphur Springs is an unincorporated community in Crawford County, Indiana, in the United States.

Sulphur Springs was named for the mineral spa it once contained.
