= Middleboro, Ohio =

Unincorporated community in Ohio, U.S.

Coordinates: 39°21′02″N 84°02′30″W

Middleboro is an unincorporated community in Warren County, in the U.S. state of Ohio.

== History ==
Middleboro was platted in 1838. A variant name was "Middleborough".
