= Lunns Store, Tennessee =

Unincorporated community in Tennessee, US

Coordinates: 35.6820154°N 86.7670319°W

Lunns Store is an unincorporated community in Marshall County, in the U.S. state of Tennessee. A variant name was "Lunn Store".

== History ==
A post office called Lunns Store was established in 1876, and remained in operation until 1907. Beside post office, the community had a country store.
