= Ohio State Route 707 =

State highway in Mercer County, Ohio, US

State Route 707

Route information
- Maintained by ODOT
- Length: 19.45 mi (31.30 km)
- Existed: 1937–present

Major junctions
- West end: SR 218 near Willshire
- US 33 / US 127 near Rockford
- East end: SR 117 near Mendon

Location
- Country: United States
- State: Ohio
- Counties: Mercer

Highway system
- Ohio State Highway System; Interstate; US; State; Scenic
← SR 706	→ SR 708

State Route 707 (SR 707) is a 19.45-mile-long (31.30 km) east–west state highway in the western portion of the U.S. state of Ohio. The western terminus of SR 707 is at the Indiana state line about 7.5 miles (12.1 km) southwest of Willshire, where it transitions into Indiana State Road 218. The eastern terminus of SR 707 is at SR 117 nearly 3 miles (4.8 km) north of Mendon.

== Route description ==
The entirety of SR 707 is situated within the northern half of Mercer County. No portion of the route is included within the National Highway System (NHS). The NHS is a network of highways identified as being most important for the economy, mobility and defense of the nation.

== History ==
SR 707 was established in 1937. It has maintained the same routing through the northern portion of Mercer County throughout its history.

== Major intersections ==
The entire route is in Mercer County.

Location	mi	km	Destinations	Notes
Black Creek Township	0.00	0.00	SR 218 west	Indiana state line
Black Creek Township	0.96	1.54	SR 49	
Dublin Township	8.21	13.21	SR 118	
Dublin Township	11.29	18.17	US 33 west / CR 210 (Mercer Road)	Western end of US 33 concurrency
Dublin Township	11.82	19.02	US 33 east / US 127 south	Eastern end of US 33 concurrency, western end of US 127 concurrency
Dublin Township	13.09	21.07	US 127 north	Eastern end of US 127 concurrency
Union Township	19.45	31.30	SR 117 / CR 151 (Hickernell Road)	
1.000 mi = 1.609 km; 1.000 km = 0.621 mi: Concurrency terminus
