= Bruno Betzel =

American baseball player (1894–1965)

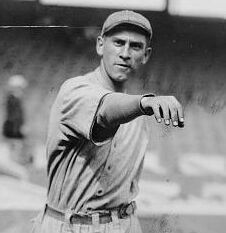
- Second baseman/Third baseman
- Born: December 6, 1894; Mercer County, Ohio, U.S.
- Died: February 7, 1965 (aged 70); Hollywood, Florida, U.S.
- Batted: Right Threw: Right

MLB debut
- September 3, 1914, for the St. Louis Cardinals

Last MLB appearance
- September 2, 1918, for the St. Louis Cardinals

MLB statistics
- Batting average: .231
- Home runs: 2
- Runs batted in: 94
- Stats at Baseball Reference

Teams
- St. Louis Cardinals (1914–1918)

Christian Frederick Albert John Henry David "Bruno" Betzel (December 6, 1894 – February 7, 1965) was an American infielder in Major League Baseball and a longtime manager at the minor league level. In 26 years as a minor league skipper, between the years of 1927 and 1956 (he did not manage in 1931, 1949 (when he was a scout for the New York Yankees), nor in 1954–55), Betzel compiled a record of 1,887 victories and 1,892 losses for a winning percentage of .499.

Born in Chattanooga, Ohio, a small town in Mercer County on the Indiana border, Betzel played his entire, five-year Major League career for the St. Louis Cardinals, between 1914 and 1918. A right-handed batter and thrower, he appeared in 448 games and batted .231 with 333 hits, including 37 doubles, 25 triples, two home runs and 94 runs batted in. He was the Redbirds' regular third baseman in 1915 and second baseman in 1916.

In 1927 Bruno began his managing career with the Indianapolis Indians of the Class AA American Association; the following season, he won his first pennant. He would win six more championships, all of them in the higher levels of the minor leagues, over the course of his managing career. After farm systems were adopted in the 1930s, Betzel piloted minor league affiliates of the Yankees, Brooklyn Dodgers, New York Giants and Cincinnati Reds. He was integral in the process which sent the first black player to the Major Leagues. As manager of the Jersey City Giants, whose nemesis was the Montreal Royals team, Betzel said of Jackie Robinson (Montreal's second baseman), "I don't care if he is polka-dotted, he will be a big league player", and "I'd tuck him into bed at night if necessary to have him play for me in the big leagues".

In his final season as a manager, 1956, he led the Toronto Maple Leafs to the International League pennant, although the Leafs dropped the Governors' Cup playoff series to the Rochester Red Wings in seven games.

Betzel was inducted into the International League Hall of Fame in 1957.

He died in Hollywood, Florida, at the age of 70.

According to Official Baseball 1945, Betzel was endowed with six given names to honor all six of his uncles; he gained his lifelong nickname "Bruno" after a St. Bernard Dog of his youth that used to follow him around.
