= Salem Township, Auglaize County, Ohio =

Township in Ohio, US

- Township
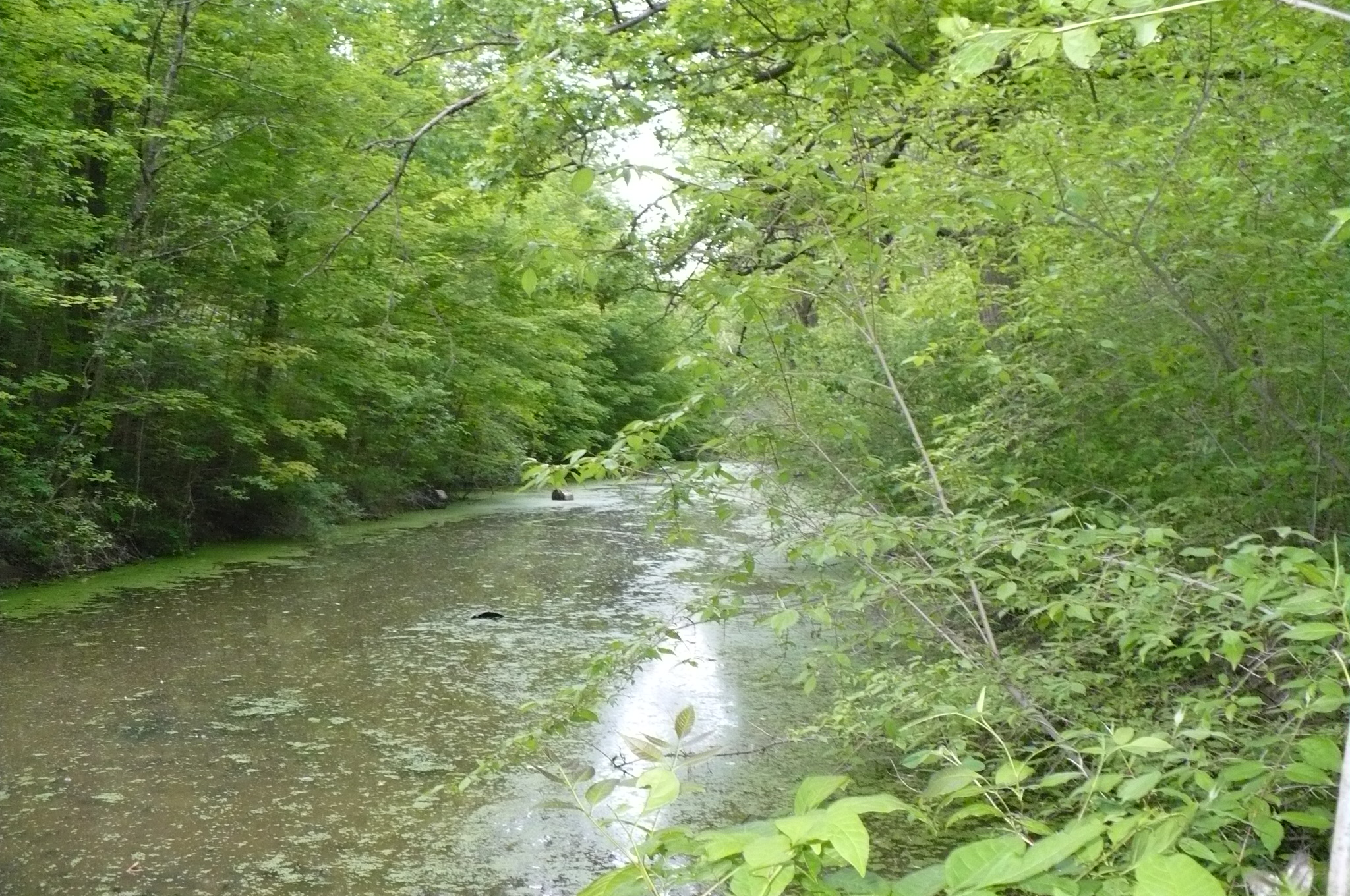
- Part of the Miami and Erie Canal Deep Cut, a National Historic Landmark

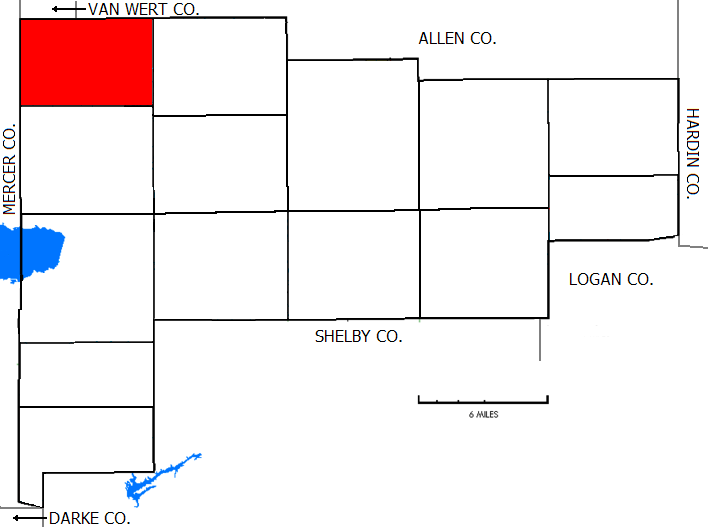
- Location of Salem Township in Auglaize County
- Coordinates: 40°39′16″N 84°22′39″W
- Country: United States
- State: Ohio
- County: Auglaize

Area
  - Total: 24.8 sq mi (64.2 km^{2})
  - Land: 24.8 sq mi (64.2 km^{2})
  - Water: 0 sq mi (0.0 km^{2})
- Elevation: 817 ft (249 m)

Population (2020)
  - Total: 507
  - Density: 20.5/sq mi (7.90/km^{2})
- Time zone: UTC-5 (Eastern (EST))
  - Summer (DST): UTC-4 (EDT)
- FIPS code: 39-69806
- GNIS feature ID: 1085772

Salem Township is one of the fourteen townships of Auglaize County, Ohio, United States. The 2020 census found 507 people in the township.

== Geography ==
Located in the northwestern corner of the county, it borders the following townships:

- Jennings Township, Van Wert County - north
- Spencer Township, Allen County - northeast
- Logan Township - east
- Noble Township - south
- Center Township, Mercer County - southwest
- Union Township, Mercer County - west

No municipalities are located in Salem Township, although the unincorporated community of Kossuth lies in the township's east.

According to the U.S. Census Bureau, Salem Township has an area of 24.8 square miles (64.2 km^{2}).

== Name and history ==
It is one of fourteen Salem Townships statewide.

Organized in 1836, the township was originally part of Mercer County and included portions of what are now Jennings Township in Van Wert County and Spencer Township in Allen County.

After the creation of Auglaize County in 1848, the remaining portions of Salem Township were joined with the northern portions of what was then Wayne Township in Mercer County.

The remaining southern portion of Mercer County's Wayne Township was organized as Noble Township as there was already a Wayne Township, one that had originally been a part of Allen County.

== Government ==
The township is governed by a three-member board of trustees, who are elected in November of odd-numbered years to a four-year term beginning on the following January 1. Two are elected in the year after the presidential election and one is elected in the year before it. There is also an elected township fiscal officer, who serves a four-year term beginning on April 1 of the year after the election, which is held in November of the year before the presidential election. Vacancies in the fiscal officership or on the board of trustees are filled by the remaining trustees.

== Public services ==
The township is split between Spencerville Local Schools and the Saint Marys City School District.

The northern section of the township is served by the Spencerville (45887) post office, with the southern section served by the Saint Marys (45884) and the Mendon (45862) post offices.
