= Black Creek Township =

Black Creek Township may refer to the following townships in the United States:

- Black Creek Township, Ohio
- Black Creek Township, Luzerne County, Pennsylvania
