= Noble Township, Auglaize County, Ohio =

Township in Ohio, US

- Township
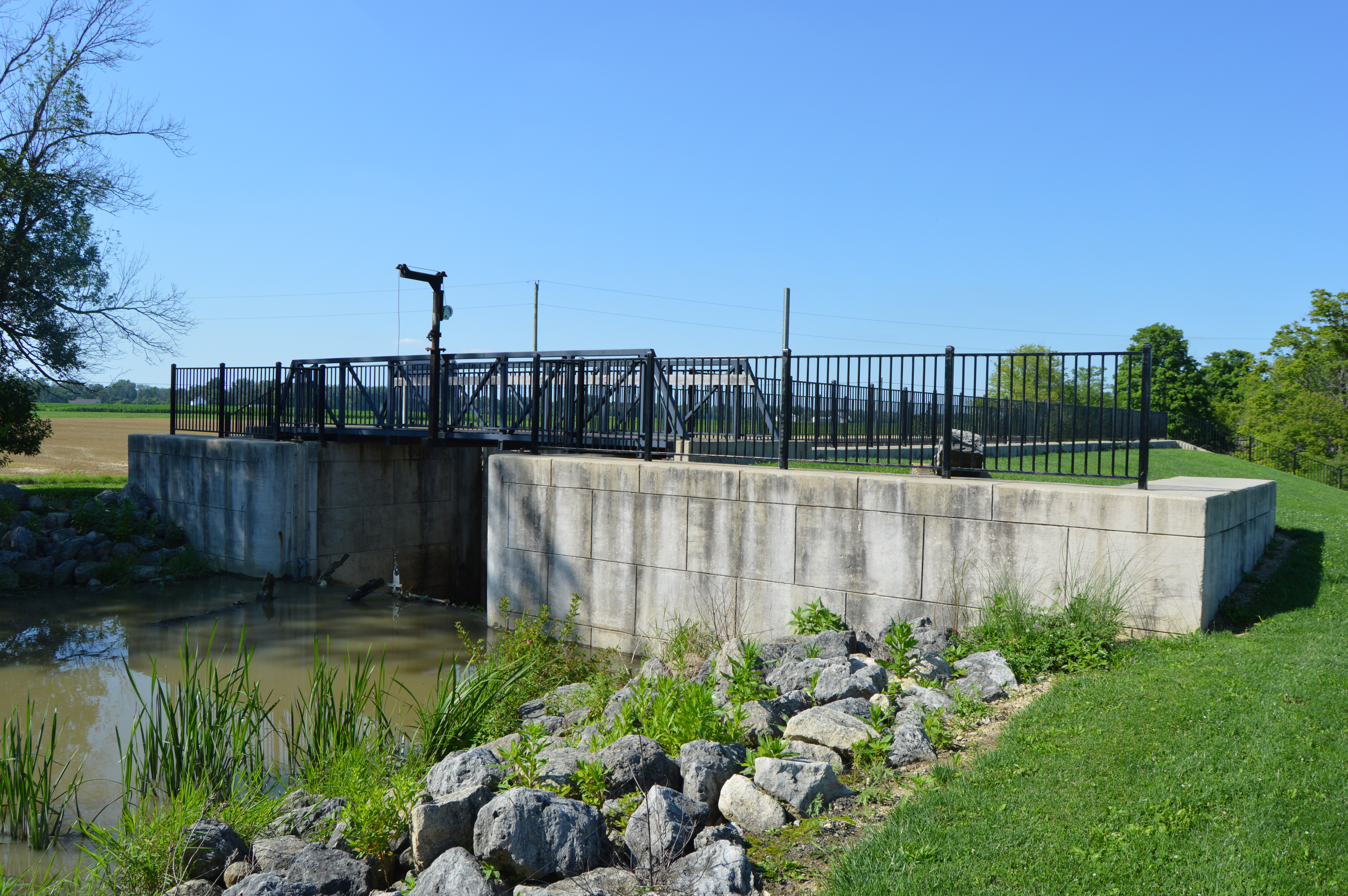
- Lock Fourteen on the Miami and Erie Canal

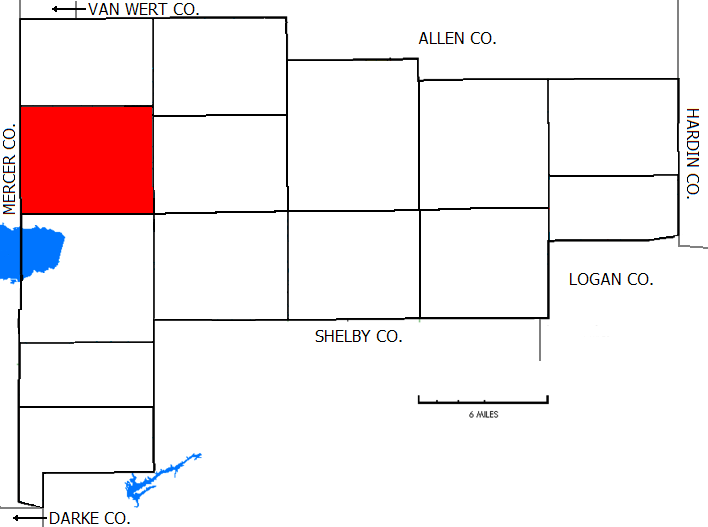
- Location of Noble Township in Auglaize County
- Coordinates: 40°35′10″N 84°23′33″W
- Country: United States
- State: Ohio
- County: Auglaize

Area
  - Total: 30.8 sq mi (79.8 km^{2})
  - Land: 30.7 sq mi (79.4 km^{2})
  - Water: 0.15 sq mi (0.4 km^{2})
- Elevation: 833 ft (254 m)

Population (2020)
  - Total: 1,863
  - Density: 60.8/sq mi (23.5/km^{2})
- Time zone: UTC-5 (Eastern (EST))
  - Summer (DST): UTC-4 (EDT)
- FIPS code: 39-55986
- GNIS feature ID: 1085769

Noble Township is one of the fourteen townships of Auglaize County, Ohio, United States. The 2020 census found 1,863 people in the township.

== Geography ==
Located in the western part of the county, it borders the following townships:

- Salem Township - north
- Logan Township - northeast
- Moulton Township - east
- Washington Township - southeast corner
- Saint Marys Township - south
- Jefferson Township, Mercer County - southwest
- Center Township, Mercer County - west

Parts of the city of St. Marys are located in southern Noble Township.

According to the U.S. Census Bureau, the total area of Noble Township is 30.8 square miles (79.8 km^{2}), of which 30.7 square miles (79.4 km^{2}) is land and 0.15 square miles (0.4 km^{2}), or 0.49%, is water. It is crossed by the St. Marys River, a tributary of the Maumee River.

== Name and history ==
Statewide, other Noble Townships are located in Defiance and Noble counties.

Before the creation of Auglaize County in 1848, Noble Township and the southern part of neighboring Salem Township were part of what was then Wayne Township in Mercer County. When the county was formed, the name of the township was changed to Noble Township as there was already a Wayne Township, one that had originally been a part of Allen County. The newly formed township was named in honor of Elisha Noble, an early local settler who served as county commissioner for Mercer and Auglaize counties.

== Government ==
The township is governed by a three-member board of trustees, who are elected in November of odd-numbered years to a four-year term beginning on the following January 1. Two are elected in the year after the presidential election and one is elected in the year before it. There is also an elected township fiscal officer, who serves a four-year term beginning on April 1 of the year after the election, which is held in November of the year before the presidential election. Vacancies in the fiscal officership or on the board of trustees are filled by the remaining trustees.

== Public services ==
The majority of the township is in the Saint Marys City School District with a small western portion being in the Parkway Local School District.

The entire township is served by the Saint Marys (45885) post office.

The major highway in Noble Township is U.S. Route 33, which traverses the southern part of the township.
