= Spencer Township, Allen County, Ohio =

Township in Ohio, US

- Township
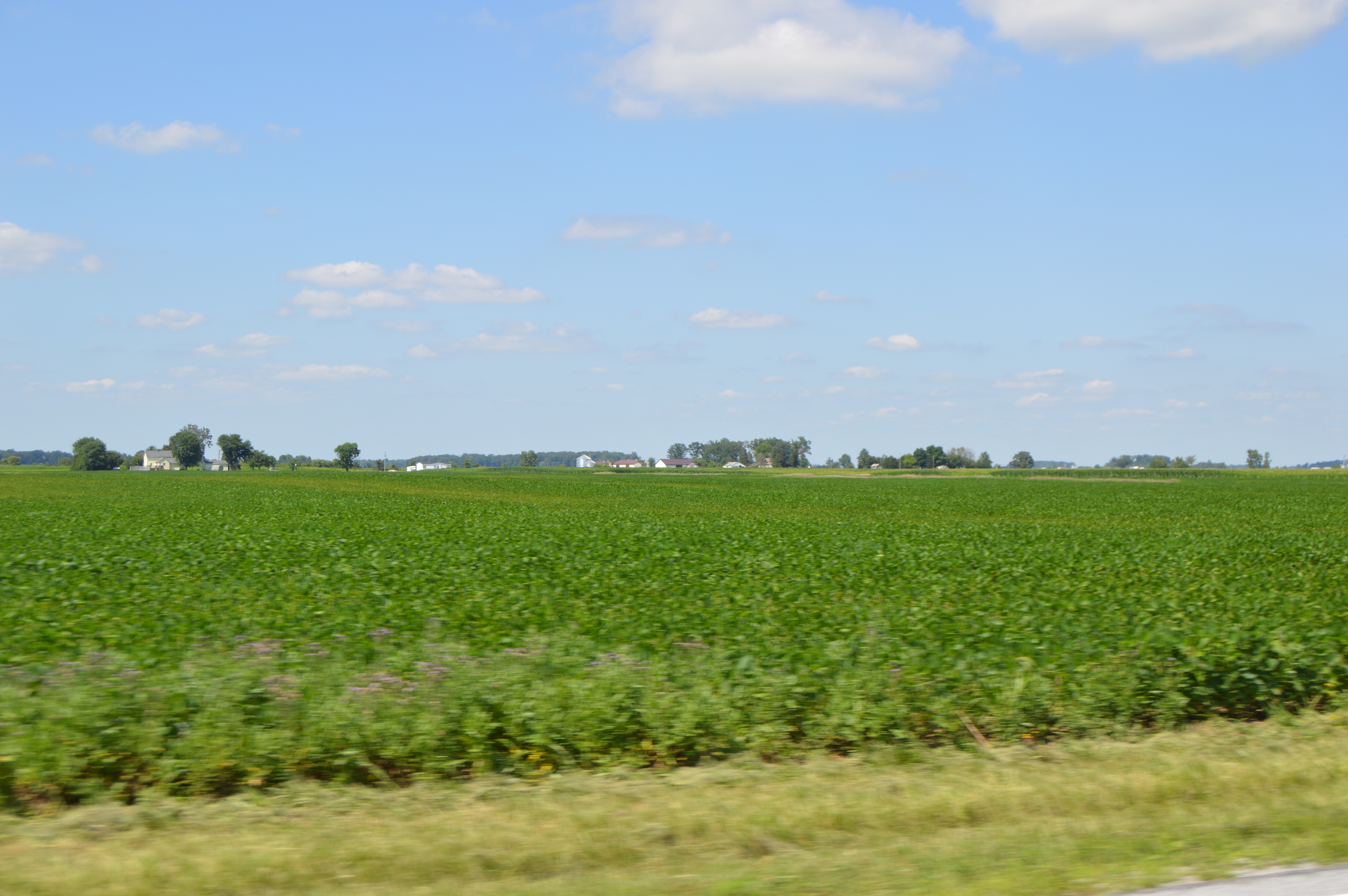
- Fields west of Spencerville from State Route 117

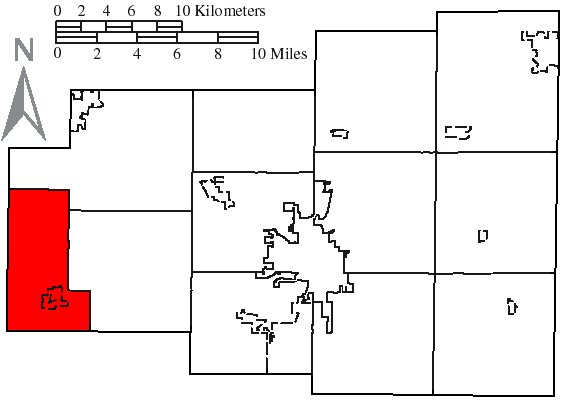
- Location of Spencer Township, Allen County, Ohio
- Coordinates: 40°42′56″N 84°21′30″W
- Country: United States
- State: Ohio
- County: Allen

Area
  - Total: 23.4 sq mi (60.5 km^{2})
  - Land: 23.3 sq mi (60.4 km^{2})
  - Water: 0.039 sq mi (0.1 km^{2})
- Elevation: 823 ft (251 m)

Population (2020)
  - Total: 3,067
  - Density: 132/sq mi (50.8/km^{2})
- Time zone: UTC-5 (Eastern (EST))
  - Summer (DST): UTC-4 (EDT)
- FIPS code: 39-73982
- GNIS feature ID: 1085700

Spencer Township is one of the twelve townships of Allen County, Ohio, United States. The 2020 census found 3,067 people in the township.

== Geography ==
Located in the southwestern corner of the county, it borders the following townships:

- Marion Township - northeast
- Amanda Township - east
- Logan Township, Auglaize County - southeast
- Salem Township, Auglaize County - southwest
- Jennings Township, Van Wert County - west

The village of Spencerville is located in southern Spencer Township.

== Name and history ==
Statewide, other Spencer Townships are located in Guernsey, Lucas, and Medina counties and formerly in Hamilton County.

== Government ==
The township is governed by a three-member board of trustees, who are elected in November of odd-numbered years to a four-year term beginning on the following January 1. Two are elected in the year after the presidential election and one is elected in the year before it. There is also an elected township fiscal officer, who serves a four-year term beginning on April 1 of the year after the election, which is held in November of the year before the presidential election. Vacancies in the fiscal officership or on the board of trustees are filled by the remaining trustees.
