= Chattanooga, Ohio =

- Unincorporated community
- Location within Ohio Location within the United States
- Coordinates: 40°38′13″N 84°47′06″W
- Country: United States
- State: Ohio
- County: Mercer
- Township: Liberty
- Elevation: 837 ft (255 m)
- ZIP Code: 45882 (Rockford)
- GNIS feature ID: 1039008

Chattanooga is an unincorporated community in Mercer County, Ohio, United States.

== History ==
A post office called Chattanooga was established in 1882, and remained in operation until 1905. Chattanooga is derived from the Cherokee name for "crow's nest". In 1907, Chattanooga had 100 inhabitants. Cities near Chattanooga, Ohio are Celina, OH and New Haven, IN.
