= Macedon, Ohio =

Unincorporated community in Ohio, U.S.

Coordinates: 40°28′46″N 84°45′09″W

Macedon is an unincorporated community in Mercer County, in the U.S. state of Ohio.

== History ==
Macedon was laid out in 1838. A post office was established at Macedon in 1841, and remained in operation until 1904.
