= Franklin Township, Mercer County, Ohio =

Township in Ohio, US

- Township
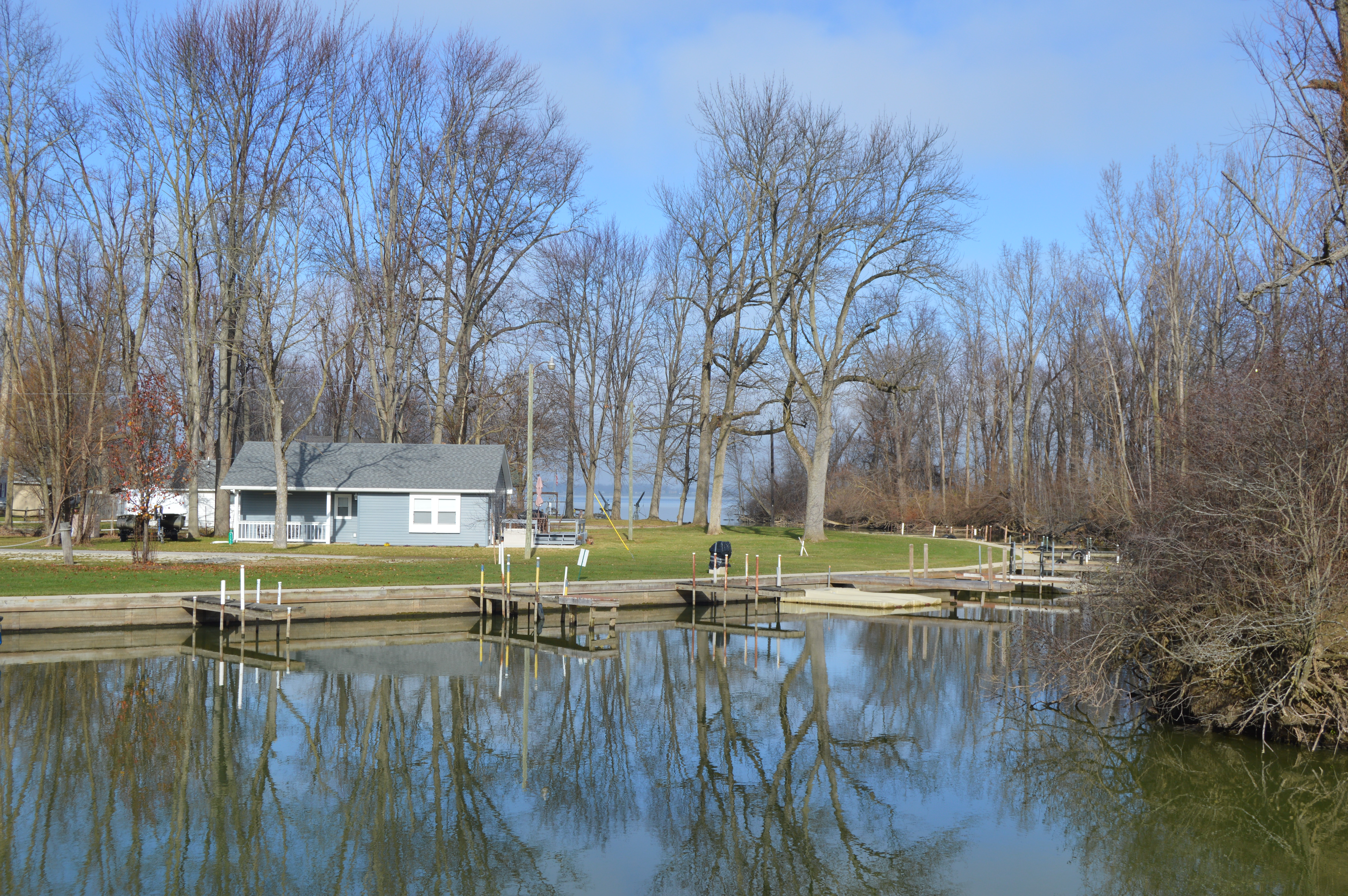
- Docks on the southern shore of Grand Lake St. Marys

- Location in Mercer County and the state of Ohio.
- Coordinates: 40°29′7″N 84°31′31″W
- Country: United States
- State: Ohio
- County: Mercer

Area
  - Total: 27.4 sq mi (71.0 km^{2})
  - Land: 25.1 sq mi (65.0 km^{2})
  - Water: 2.3 sq mi (6.0 km^{2})
- Elevation: 890 ft (270 m)

Population (2020)
  - Total: 2,511
  - Density: 100/sq mi (38.6/km^{2})
- Time zone: UTC-5 (Eastern (EST))
  - Summer (DST): UTC-4 (EDT)
- FIPS code: 39-28350
- GNIS feature ID: 1086624
- Website: https://franklintownship-mercercounty.org/

Franklin Township is one of the fourteen townships of Mercer County, Ohio, United States. The 2020 census found 2,511 people in the township.

== Geography ==
Located in the southeastern part of the county, it borders the following townships:

- Jefferson Township - north
- Saint Marys Township, Auglaize County - east
- German Township, Auglaize County - southeast
- Marion Township - south
- Butler Township - west

The village of Montezuma is located in northwestern Franklin Township.

== Name and history ==
Franklin Township was organized in 1841. It is one of twenty-one Franklin Townships statewide.

== Government ==
The township is governed by a three-member board of trustees, who are elected in November of odd-numbered years to a four-year term beginning on the following January 1. Two are elected in the year after the presidential election and one is elected in the year before it. There is also an elected township fiscal officer, who serves a four-year term beginning on April 1 of the year after the election, which is held in November of the year before the presidential election. Vacancies in the fiscal officership or on the board of trustees are filled by the remaining trustees.
