= Jefferson Township, Mercer County, Ohio =

Township in Ohio, US

- Township
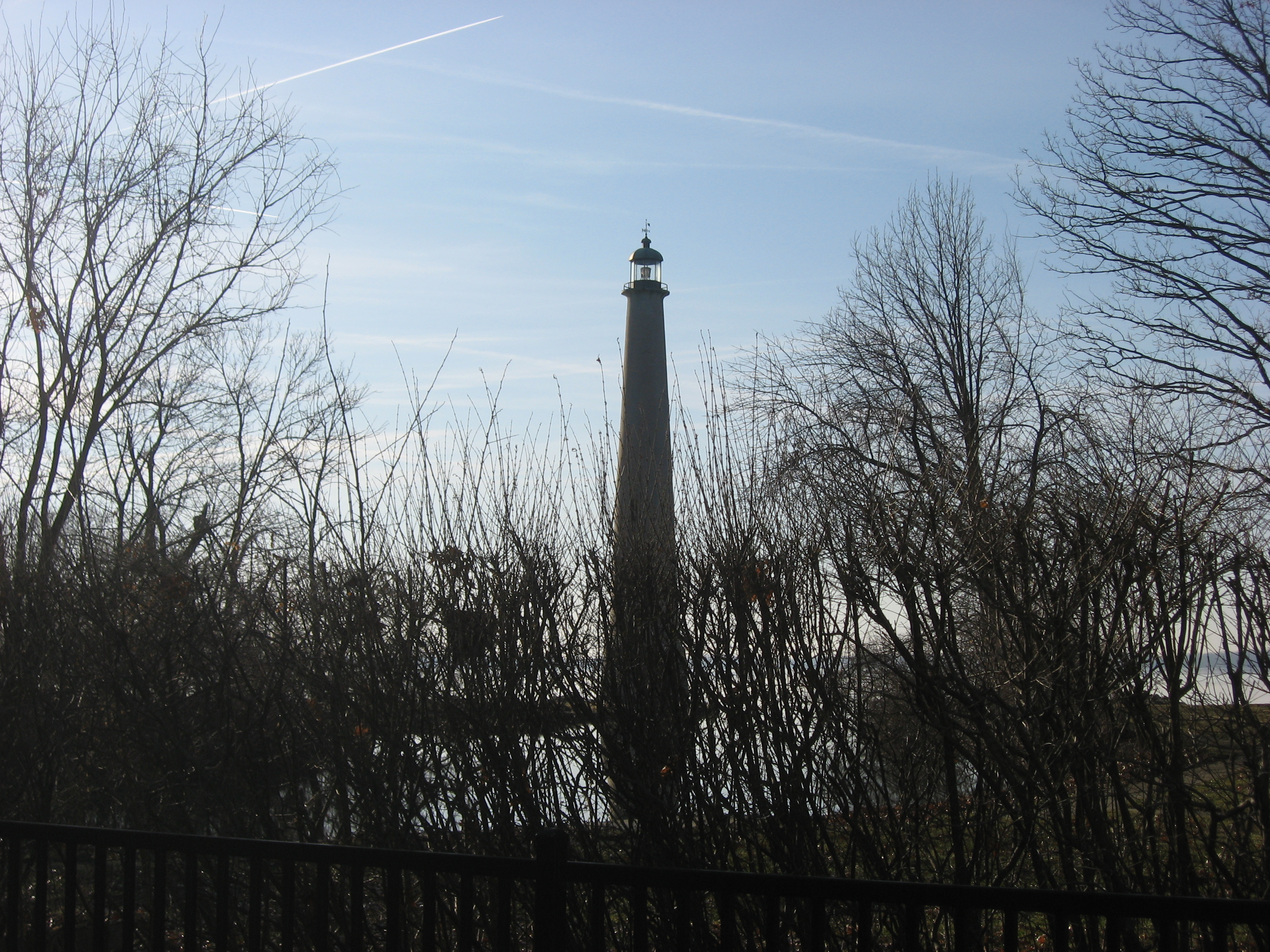
- Grand Lake St. Marys Lighthouse

- Location in Mercer County and the state of Ohio.
- Coordinates: 40°32′55″N 84°34′12″W
- Country: United States
- State: Ohio
- County: Mercer

Area
  - Total: 41.4 sq mi (107.2 km^{2})
  - Land: 33.9 sq mi (87.7 km^{2})
  - Water: 7.6 sq mi (19.6 km^{2})
- Elevation: 879 ft (268 m)

Population (2020)
  - Total: 13,802
  - Density: 408/sq mi (157/km^{2})
- Time zone: UTC-5 (Eastern (EST))
  - Summer (DST): UTC-4 (EDT)
- FIPS code: 39-38724
- GNIS feature ID: 1086628

Jefferson Township is one of the fourteen townships of Mercer County, Ohio, United States. The 2020 census found 13,802 people in the township.

== Geography ==
Located in the east central part of the county, it borders the following townships:

- Hopewell Township - north, west of Center Township
- Center Township - north, east of Hopewell Township
- Noble Township, Auglaize County - northeast
- Saint Marys Township, Auglaize County - southeast
- Franklin Township - south, east of Butler Township
- Butler Township - south, west of Franklin Township
- Washington Township - southwest
- Liberty Township - northwest

The city of Celina, the county seat of Mercer County, is located in central Jefferson Township, and Grand Lake St. Marys occupies the township's southeastern quarter.

== Name and history ==
Jefferson Township was organized around 1839. It is one of twenty-four Jefferson Townships statewide.

== Government ==
The township is governed by a three-member board of trustees, who are elected in November of odd-numbered years to a four-year term beginning on the following January 1. Two are elected in the year after the presidential election and one is elected in the year before it. There is also an elected township fiscal officer, who serves a four-year term beginning on April 1 of the year after the election, which is held in November of the year before the presidential election. Vacancies in the fiscal officership or on the board of trustees are filled by the remaining trustees.
