= Erastus, Ohio =

Community in Mercer County, Ohio

Coordinates: 40°30′32″N 84°42′28″W

Erastus is an unincorporated community in Mercer County, in the U.S. state of Ohio.

== History ==
A post office was established at Erastus in 1883, and remained in operation until it was discontinued in 1904. By 1907, Erastus had no businesses remaining. Erastus United Methodist Church was in full operation until June 30th, 2022, when they closed their doors. The church has since reopened under a new branding.
