= Washington Township, Mercer County, Ohio =

Township in Ohio, US

- Township
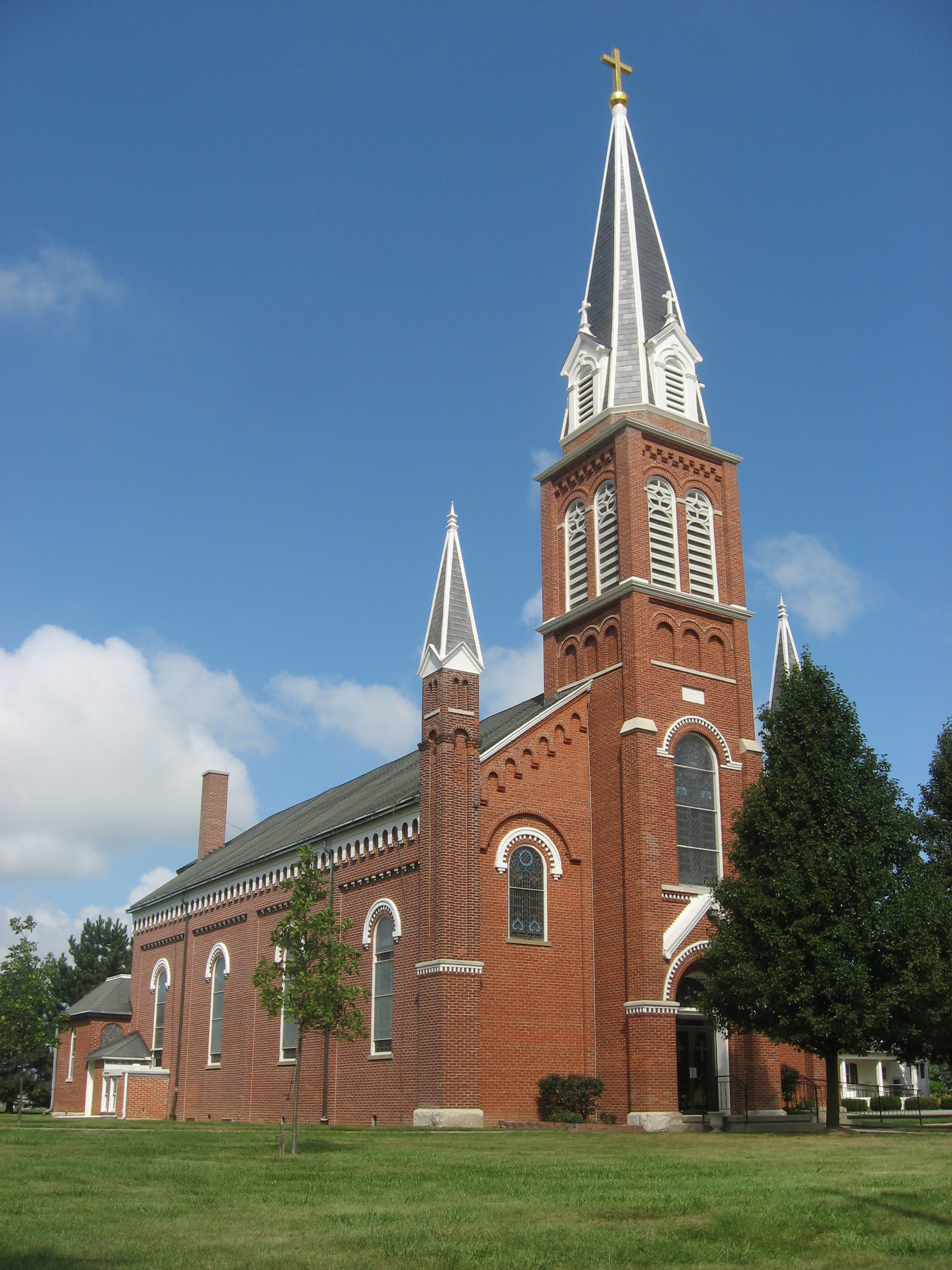
- St. Anthony Catholic Church, a landmark in the township

- Location in Mercer County and the state of Ohio.
- Coordinates: 40°30′29″N 84°45′8″W
- Country: United States
- State: Ohio
- County: Mercer

Area
  - Total: 36.3 sq mi (94.1 km^{2})
  - Land: 36.3 sq mi (94.1 km^{2})
  - Water: 0 sq mi (0.0 km^{2})
- Elevation: 869 ft (265 m)

Population (2020)
  - Total: 1,201
  - Density: 33.1/sq mi (12.8/km^{2})
- Time zone: UTC-5 (Eastern (EST))
  - Summer (DST): UTC-4 (EDT)
- FIPS code: 39-81452
- GNIS feature ID: 1086633

Washington Township is one of the fourteen townships of Mercer County, Ohio, United States. The 2020 census found 1,201 people in the township.

== Geography ==
Located in the western part of the county, it borders the following townships:

- Liberty Township – north
- Jefferson Township – northeast
- Butler Township – southeast
- Recovery Township – south
- Noble Township, Jay County, Indiana – southwest
- Wabash Township, Jay County, Indiana – northwest

No municipalities are located in Washington Township, although the unincorporated community of Padua lies in the township's west.

== Name and history ==
Washington Township was established in 1838. It is one of forty-three Washington Townships statewide.

== Government ==
The township is governed by a three-member board of trustees, who are elected in November of odd-numbered years to a four-year term beginning on the following January 1. Two are elected in the year after the presidential election and one is elected in the year before it. There is also an elected township fiscal officer, who serves a four-year term beginning on April 1 of the year after the election, which is held in November of the year before the presidential election. Vacancies in the fiscal officership or on the board of trustees are filled by the remaining trustees.
