= Mercer, Ohio =

Unincorporated community in Ohio, U.S.

Coordinates: 40°39′18″N 84°35′08″W

Mercer is an unincorporated community in Mercer County, in the U.S. state of Ohio.

== History ==
Mercer was laid out in 1833. A post office was established at Mercer in 1837, and remained in operation until 1957. The community's original name was Milan, but an act of the General Assembly changed its name to "Mercer" in 1837, honoring Hugh Mercer, hero to the American Revolution who died sixty years prior.
