= Center Township, Mercer County, Ohio =

Township in Ohio, US

- Township
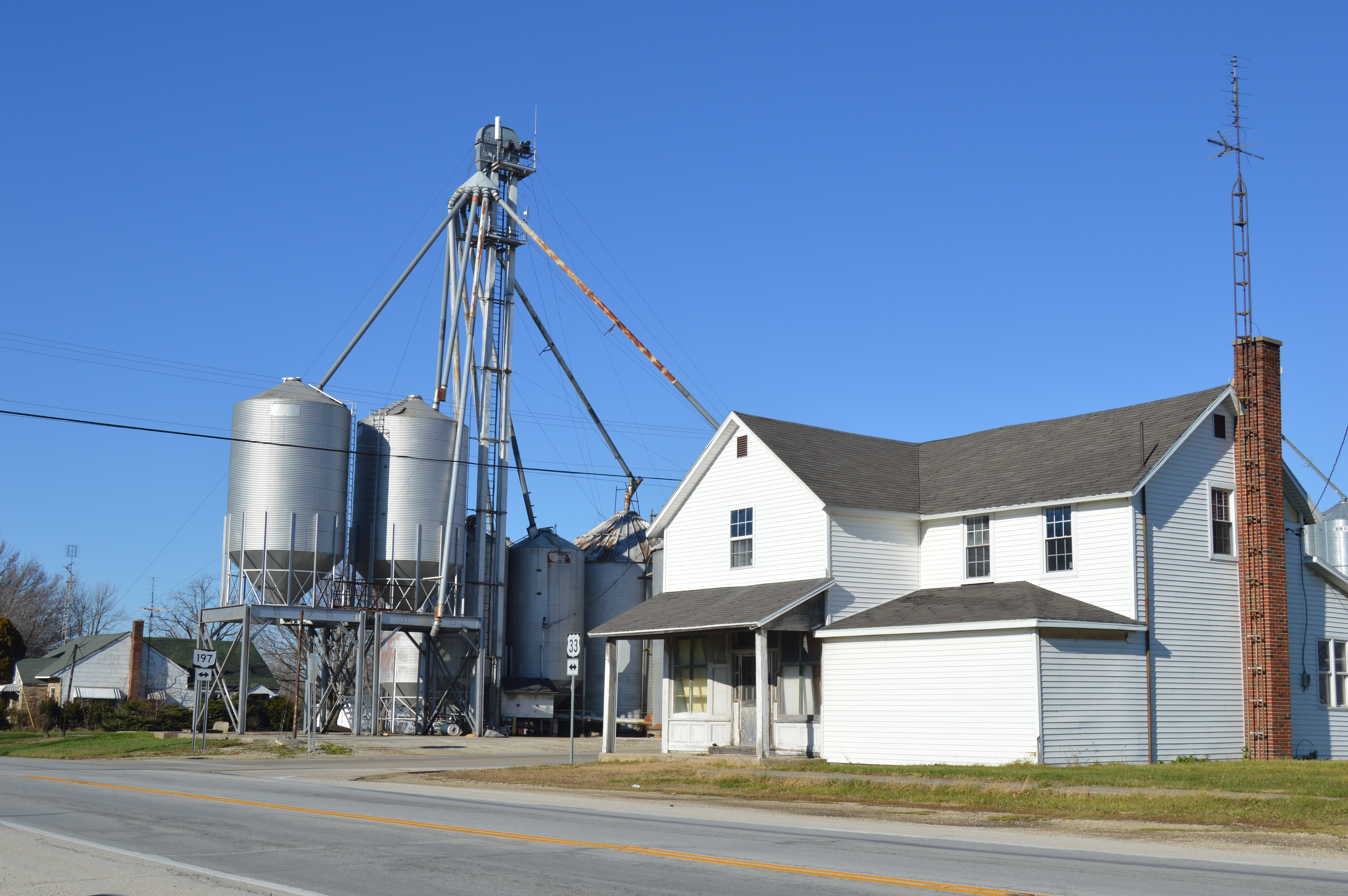
- Central Neptune

- Location in Mercer County and the state of Ohio.
- Coordinates: 40°36′33″N 84°30′37″W
- Country: United States
- State: Ohio
- County: Mercer

Area
  - Total: 30.3 sq mi (78.4 km^{2})
  - Land: 30.3 sq mi (78.4 km^{2})
  - Water: 0 sq mi (0.0 km^{2})
- Elevation: 850 ft (260 m)

Population (2020)
  - Total: 1,099
  - Density: 36.3/sq mi (14.0/km^{2})
- Time zone: UTC-5 (Eastern (EST))
  - Summer (DST): UTC-4 (EDT)
- FIPS code: 39-12952
- GNIS feature ID: 1086622

Center Township is one of the fourteen townships of Mercer County, Ohio, United States. The 2020 census found 1,099 people in the township.

== Geography ==
Located in the northeastern part of the county, it borders the following townships:

- Union Township - north
- Salem Township, Auglaize County - northeast
- Noble Township, Auglaize County - southeast
- Jefferson Township - south
- Hopewell Township - west
- Dublin Township - northwest corner

A small part of the city of Celina, the county seat of Mercer County, is located in southern Center Township.

== Name and history ==
Center Township was organized in 1834. It is one of nine Center Townships statewide.

== Government ==
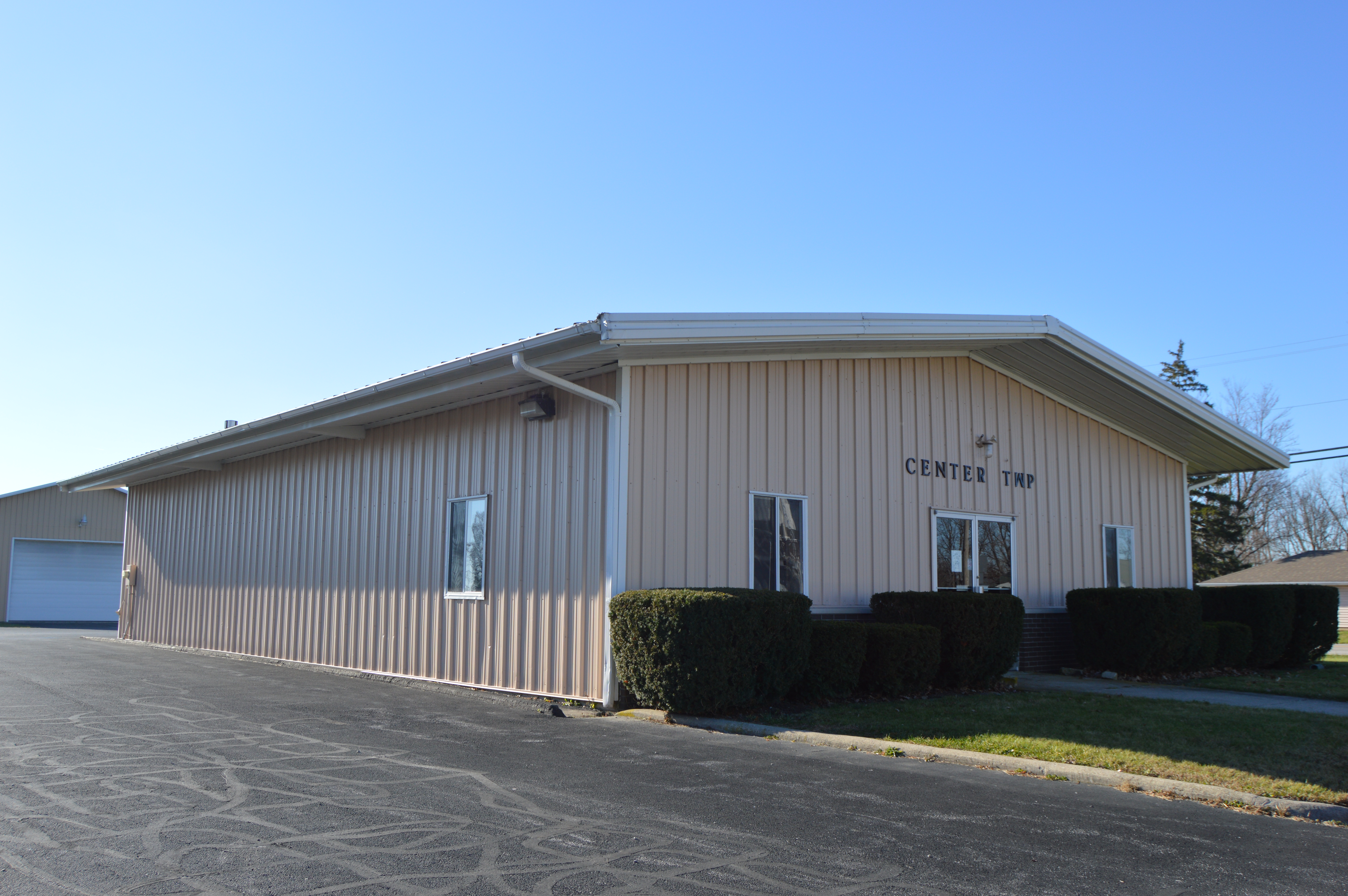
Center Town Hall in Neptune

The township is governed by a three-member board of trustees, who are elected in November of odd-numbered years to a four-year term beginning on the following January 1. Two are elected in the year after the presidential election and one is elected in the year before it. There is also an elected township fiscal officer, who serves a four-year term beginning on April 1 of the year after the election, which is held in November of the year before the presidential election. Vacancies in the fiscal officership or on the board of trustees are filled by the remaining trustees.
