= Cranberry Prairie, Ohio =

Unincorporated community in Ohio, U.S.

Coordinates: 40°23′34″N 84°34′50″W

Cranberry Prairie is an unincorporated community in southern Granville Township, Mercer County, in the U.S. state of Ohio.

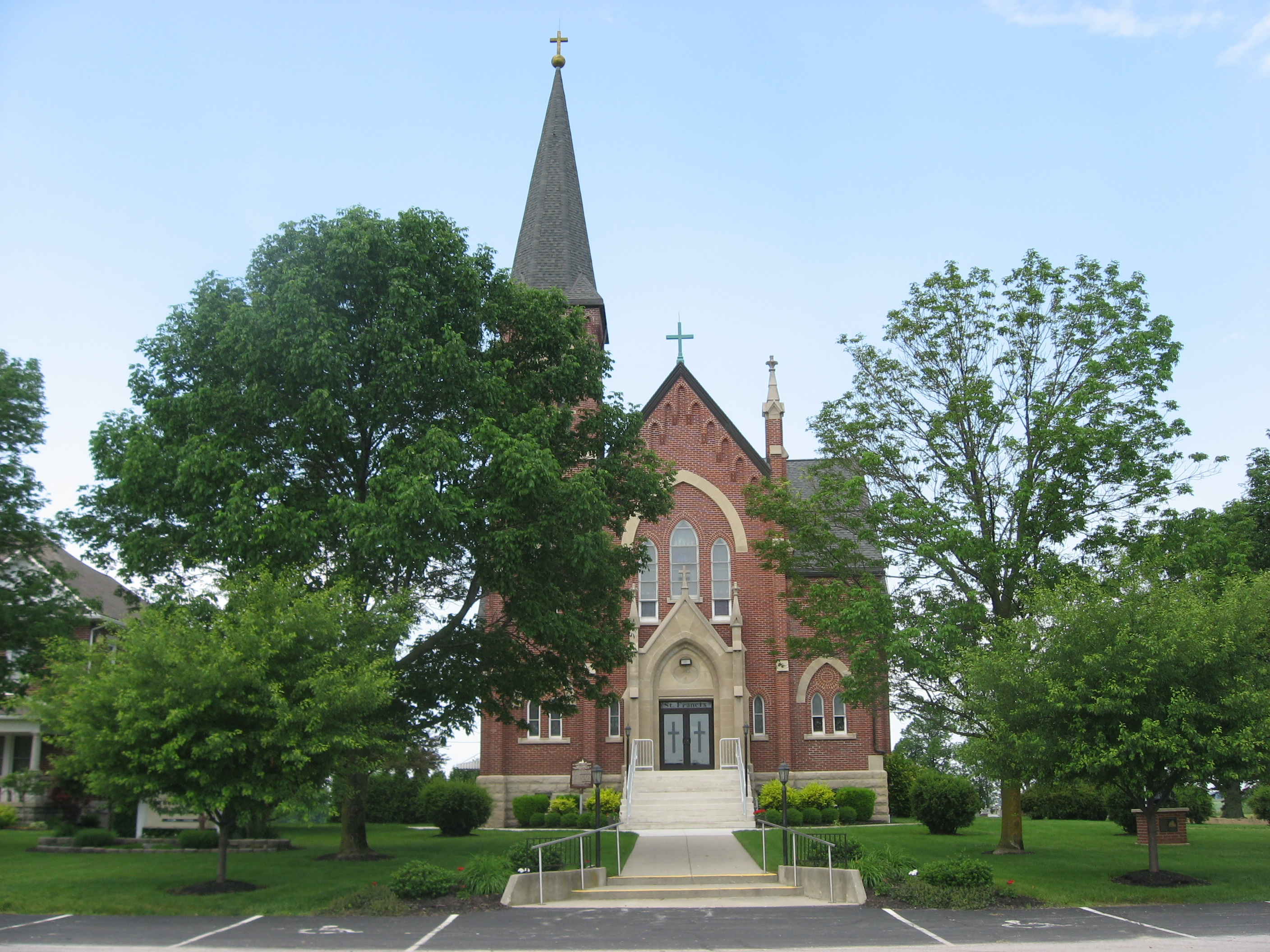
Saint Francis Catholic Church (Cranberry Prairie, Ohio)

== History ==
A post office called Cranberry Prairie was established in 1851, and remained in operation until 1904. Besides the post office, Cranberry Prairie has a Catholic church and a country store.
