= Hopewell Township, Mercer County, Ohio =

Township in Ohio, US

- Township
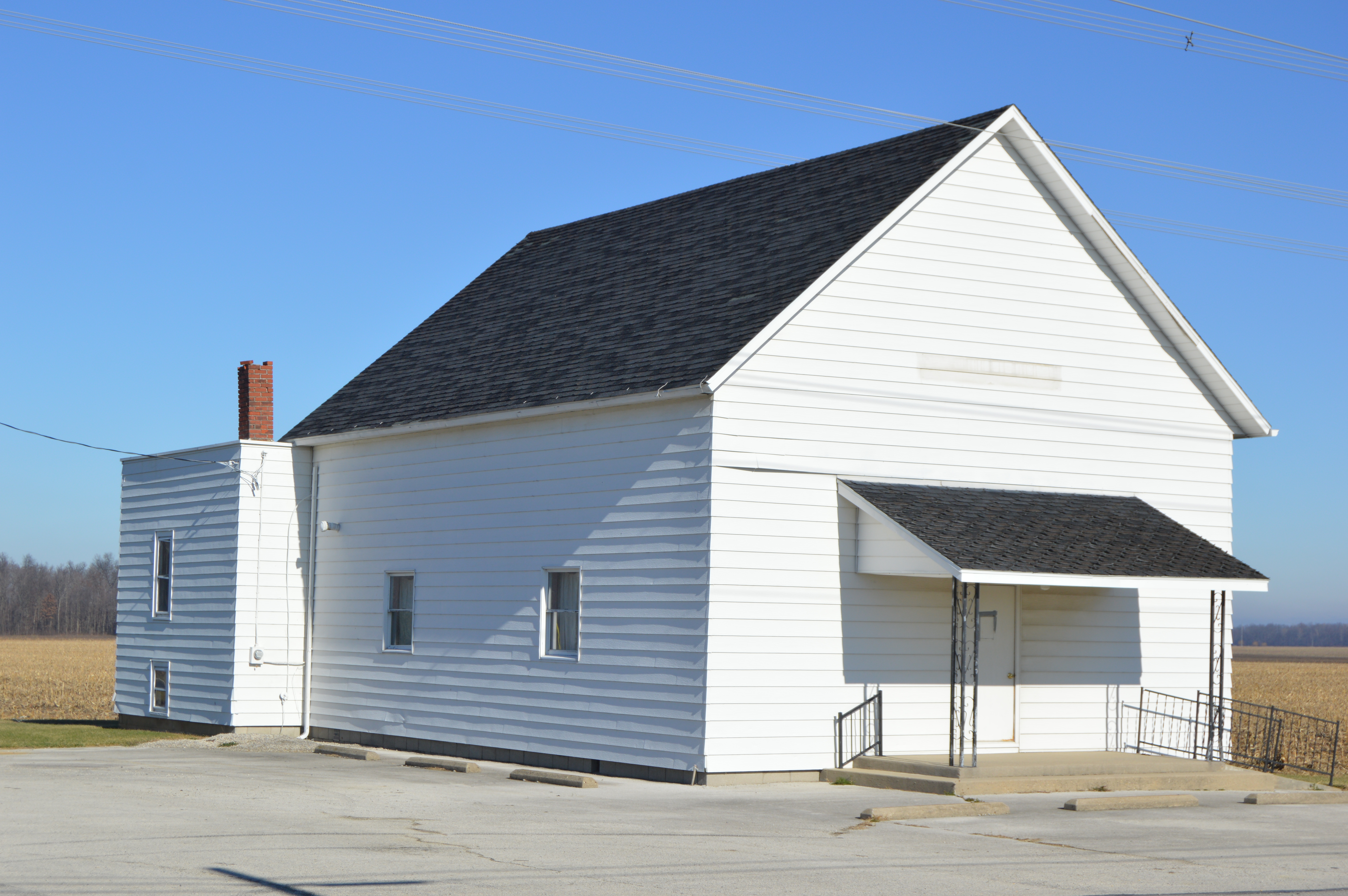
- Township hall

- Location in Mercer County and the state of Ohio.
- Coordinates: 40°36′26″N 84°37′0″W
- Country: United States
- State: Ohio
- County: Mercer

Area
  - Total: 31.3 sq mi (81.0 km^{2})
  - Land: 31.3 sq mi (81.0 km^{2})
  - Water: 0 sq mi (0.0 km^{2})
- Elevation: 850 ft (259 m)

Population (2020)
  - Total: 1,024
  - Density: 32.7/sq mi (12.6/km^{2})
- Time zone: UTC-5 (Eastern (EST))
  - Summer (DST): UTC-4 (EDT)
- FIPS code: 39-36344
- GNIS feature ID: 1086627

Hopewell Township is one of the fourteen townships of Mercer County, Ohio, United States. The 2020 census found 1,024 people in the township.

== Geography ==
Located in the north central part of the county, it borders the following townships:

- Dublin Township - north
- Union Township - northeast corner
- Center Township - east
- Jefferson Township - south
- Liberty Township - west
- Black Creek Township - northwest corner

No municipalities are located in Hopewell Township.

== Name and history ==
Hopewell Township was organized in 1842. It is one of five Hopewell Townships statewide.

== Government ==
The township is governed by a three-member board of trustees, who are elected in November of odd-numbered years to a four-year term beginning on the following January 1. Two are elected in the year after the presidential election and one is elected in the year before it. There is also an elected township fiscal officer, who serves a four-year term beginning on April 1 of the year after the election, which is held in November of the year before the presidential election. Vacancies in the fiscal officership or on the board of trustees are filled by the remaining trustees.
