= Hopewell Township, Ohio =

Hopewell Township, Ohio, may refer to:

- Hopewell Township, Licking County, Ohio
- Hopewell Township, Mercer County, Ohio
- Hopewell Township, Muskingum County, Ohio
- Hopewell Township, Perry County, Ohio
- Hopewell Township, Seneca County, Ohio
