= Union Township, Mercer County, Ohio =

Township in Ohio, US

- Township
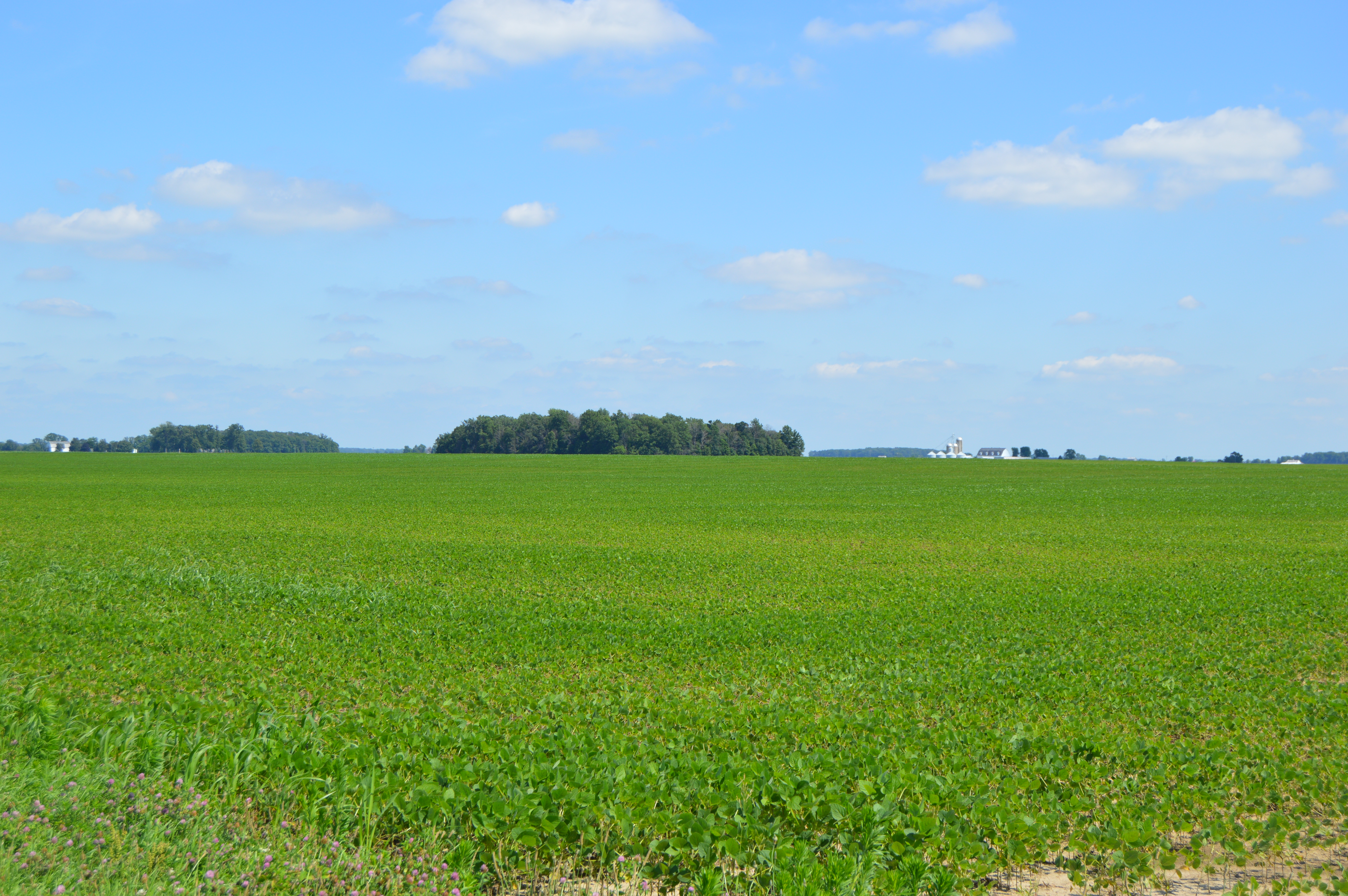
- Along the township's northern border

- Location in Mercer County and the state of Ohio.
- Coordinates: 40°40′38″N 84°31′15″W
- Country: United States
- State: Ohio
- County: Mercer

Area
  - Total: 36.4 sq mi (94.4 km^{2})
  - Land: 36.4 sq mi (94.4 km^{2})
  - Water: 0 sq mi (0.0 km^{2})
- Elevation: 807 ft (246 m)

Population (2020)
  - Total: 1,330
  - Density: 36.5/sq mi (14.1/km^{2})
- Time zone: UTC-5 (Eastern (EST))
  - Summer (DST): UTC-4 (EDT)
- FIPS code: 39-78442
- GNIS feature ID: 1086632

Union Township is one of the 14 townships of Mercer County, Ohio, United States. The 2020 census found 1,330 people in the township.

== Geography ==
Located in the northeastern corner of the county, it borders the following townships:

- York Township, Van Wert County - north
- Jennings Township, Van Wert County - northeast
- Salem Township, Auglaize County - southeast
- Center Township - south
- Hopewell Township - southwest
- Dublin Township - west
- Liberty Township, Van Wert County - northwest

The village of Mendon is located in central Union Township.

== Name and history ==
Union Township was organized in 1828. It is one of 27 Union Townships statewide.

== Government ==
The township is governed by a three-member board of trustees, who are elected in November of odd-numbered years to a four-year term beginning on the following January 1. Two are elected in the year after the presidential election and one is elected in the year before it. There is also an elected township fiscal officer, who serves a four-year term beginning on April 1 of the year after the election, which is held in November of the year before the presidential election. Vacancies in the fiscal officership or on the board of trustees are filled by the remaining trustees.
