= Liberty Township, Mercer County, Ohio =

Township in Ohio, US

- Township
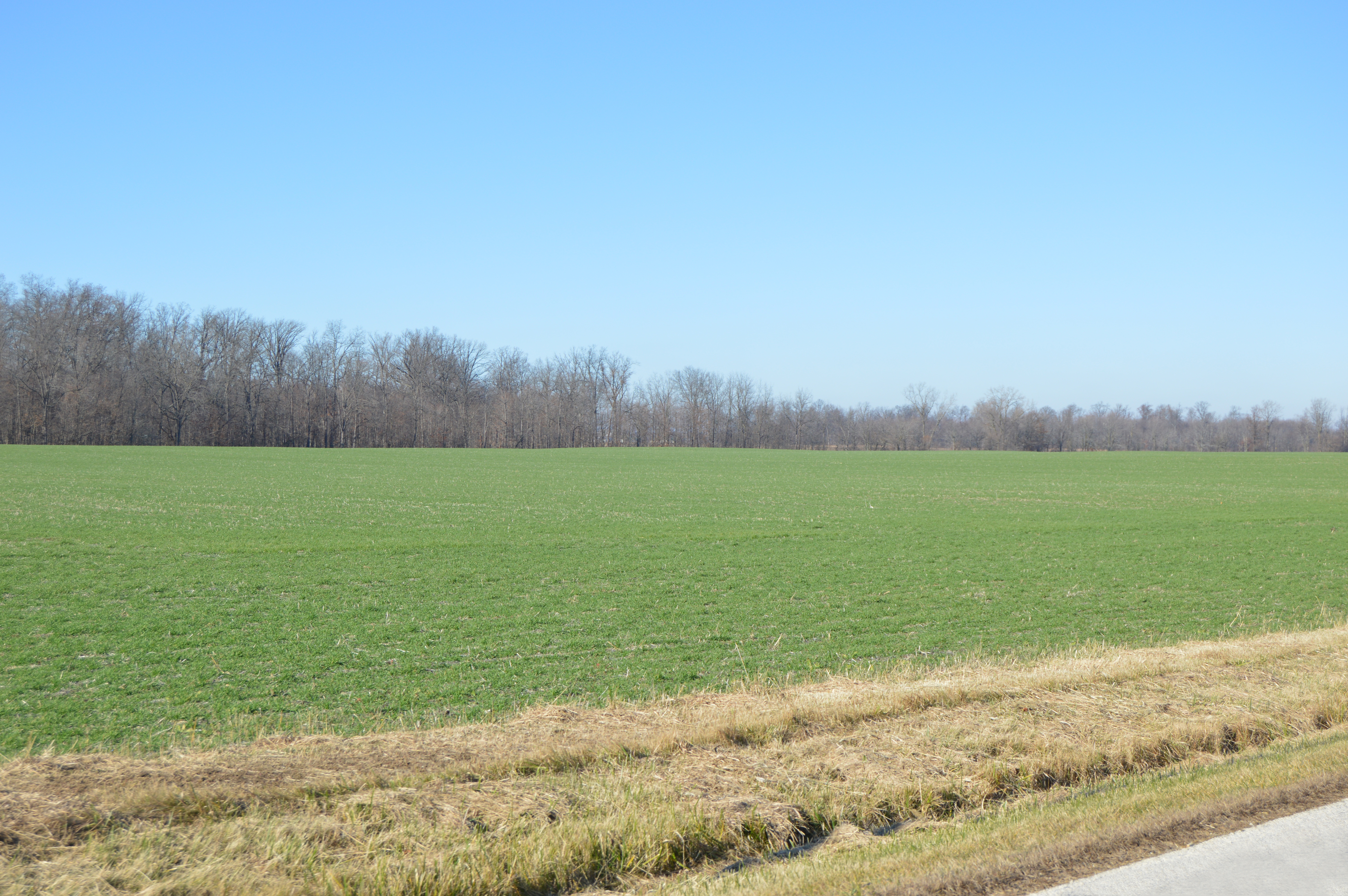
- Young winter wheat fields on Wabash Road

- Location in Mercer County and the state of Ohio.
- Coordinates: 40°35′8″N 84°44′13″W
- Country: United States
- State: Ohio
- County: Mercer

Area
  - Total: 35.9 sq mi (92.9 km^{2})
  - Land: 35.9 sq mi (92.9 km^{2})
  - Water: 0 sq mi (0.0 km^{2})
- Elevation: 860 ft (262 m)

Population (2020)
  - Total: 909
  - Density: 25.3/sq mi (9.78/km^{2})
- Time zone: UTC-5 (Eastern (EST))
  - Summer (DST): UTC-4 (EDT)
- FIPS code: 39-43260
- GNIS feature ID: 1086629

Liberty Township is one of the fourteen townships of Mercer County, Ohio, United States. The 2020 census found 909 people in the township.

== Geography ==
Located in the northwestern part of the county, it borders the following townships:

- Black Creek Township - north
- Dublin Township - northeast corner
- Hopewell Township - east
- Jefferson Township - southeast
- Washington Township - south
- Wabash Township, Jay County, Indiana - southwest
- Jefferson Township, Adams County, Indiana - northwest

No municipalities are located in Liberty Township.

== Name and history ==
Liberty Township was organized in 1841. It is one of twenty-five Liberty Townships statewide.

== Government ==
The township is governed by a three-member board of trustees, who are elected in November of odd-numbered years to a four-year term beginning on the following January 1. Two are elected in the year after the presidential election and one is elected in the year before it. There is also an elected township fiscal officer, who serves a four-year term beginning on April 1 of the year after the election, which is held in November of the year before the presidential election. Vacancies in the fiscal officership or on the board of trustees are filled by the remaining trustees.
