= Dublin Township, Mercer County, Ohio =

Township in Ohio, US

- Township
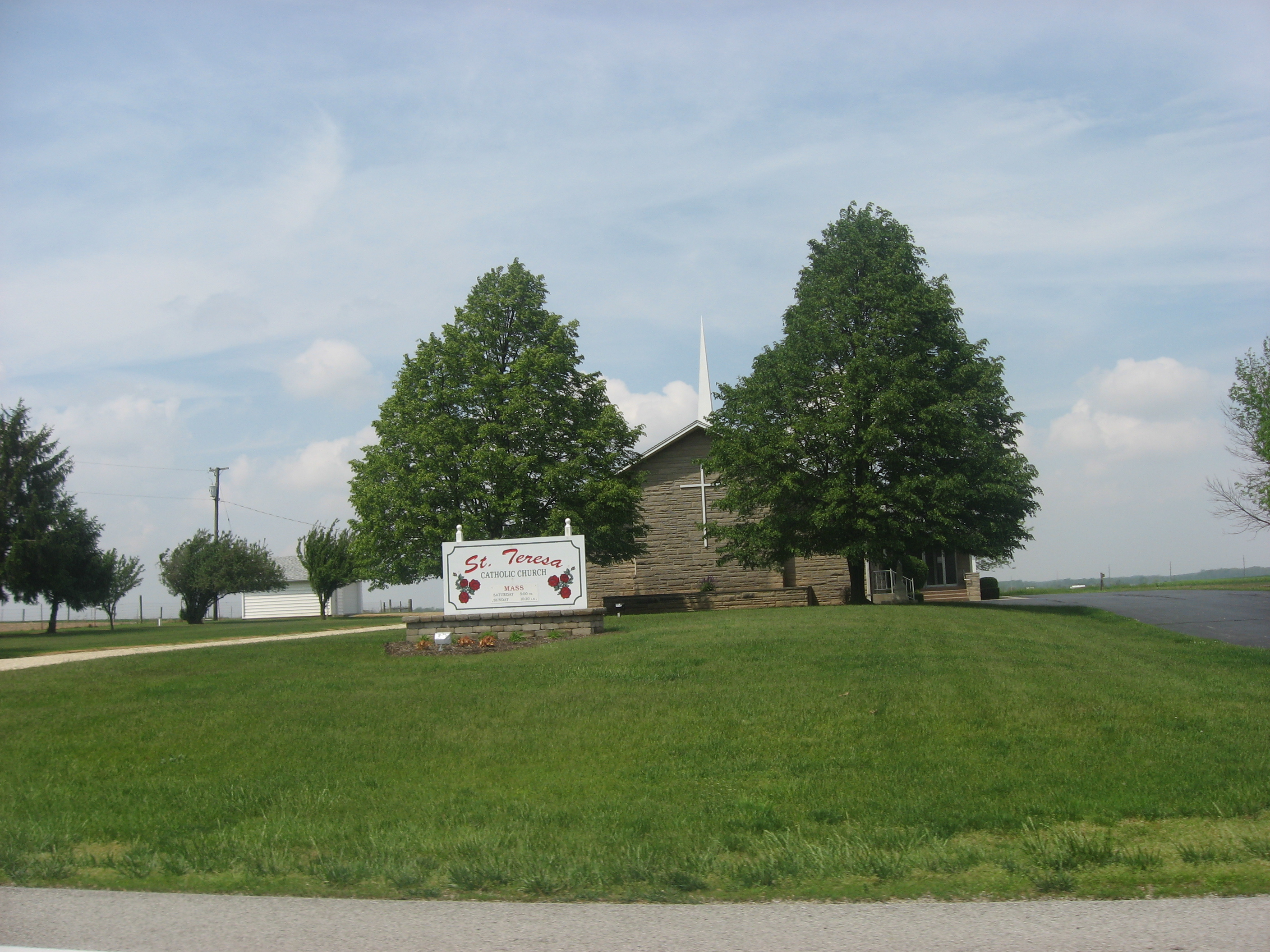
- St. Theresa's Catholic Church

- Location in Mercer County and the state of Ohio.
- Coordinates: 40°41′10″N 84°37′41″W
- Country: United States
- State: Ohio
- County: Mercer

Area
  - Total: 37.4 sq mi (96.9 km^{2})
  - Land: 37.4 sq mi (96.8 km^{2})
  - Water: 0 sq mi (0.0 km^{2})
- Elevation: 797 ft (243 m)

Population (2020)
  - Total: 2,132
  - Density: 57.0/sq mi (22.0/km^{2})
- Time zone: UTC-5 (Eastern (EST))
  - Summer (DST): UTC-4 (EDT)
- FIPS code: 39-22708
- GNIS feature ID: 1086623

Dublin Township is one of the fourteen townships of Mercer County, Ohio, United States. The 2020 census found 2,132 people in the township.

== Geography ==
Located in the northern part of the county, it borders the following townships:

- Liberty Township, Van Wert County - north
- York Township, Van Wert County - northeast corner
- Union Township - east
- Center Township - southeast corner
- Hopewell Township - south
- Liberty Township - southwest corner
- Black Creek Township - west
- Willshire Township, Van Wert County - northwest corner

The village of Rockford is located in central Dublin Township.

== Name and history ==
Dublin Township was organized in 1824. It is the only Dublin Township statewide.

== Government ==
The township is governed by a three-member board of trustees, who are elected in November of odd-numbered years to a four-year term beginning on the following January 1. Two are elected in the year after the presidential election and one is elected in the year before it. There is also an elected township fiscal officer, who serves a four-year term beginning on April 1 of the year after the election, which is held in November of the year before the presidential election. Vacancies in the fiscal officership or on the board of trustees are filled by the remaining trustees.
