= Black Creek Township, Ohio =

Township in Ohio, US

- Township
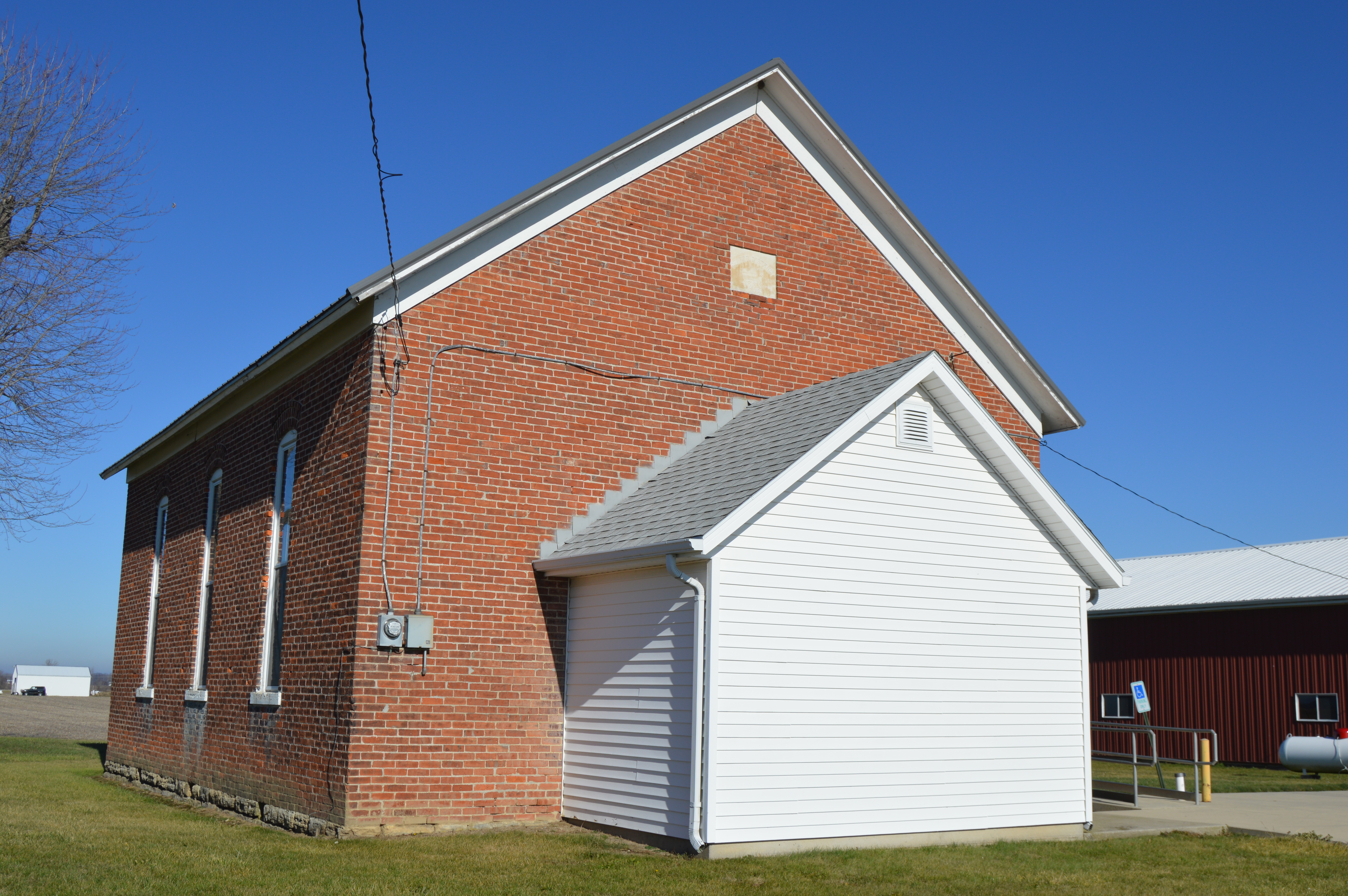
- Township hall

- Location in Mercer County and the state of Ohio.
- Coordinates: 40°41′19″N 84°44′26″W
- Country: United States
- State: Ohio
- County: Mercer

Area
  - Total: 35.8 sq mi (92.6 km^{2})
  - Land: 35.8 sq mi (92.6 km^{2})
  - Water: 0 sq mi (0.0 km^{2})
- Elevation: 804 ft (245 m)

Population (2020)
  - Total: 611
  - Density: 17.1/sq mi (6.60/km^{2})
- Time zone: UTC-5 (Eastern (EST))
  - Summer (DST): UTC-4 (EDT)
- FIPS code: 39-06586
- GNIS feature ID: 1086620
- Website: http://www.blackcreektownship-mercercounty.org/

Black Creek Township is one of the fourteen townships of Mercer County, Ohio, United States. The 2020 census found 611 people in the township.

== Geography ==
Located in the northwestern corner of the county, it borders the following townships:

- Willshire Township, Van Wert County – north
- Liberty Township, Van Wert County – northeast corner
- Dublin Township – east
- Hopewell Township – southeast corner
- Liberty Township – south
- Jefferson Township, Adams County, Indiana – southwest
- Blue Creek Township, Adams County, Indiana – northwest

No municipalities are located in Black Creek Township.

== Name and history ==
Black Creek Township was organized in 1834. It is the only Black Creek Township statewide.

== Government ==
The township is governed by a three-member board of trustees, who are elected in November of odd-numbered years to a four-year term beginning on the following January 1. Two are elected in the year after the presidential election and one is elected in the year before it. There is also an elected township fiscal officer, who serves a four-year term beginning on April 1 of the year after the election, which is held in November of the year before the presidential election. Vacancies in the fiscal officership or on the board of trustees are filled by the remaining trustees.
