= Mendon, Ohio =

- Village
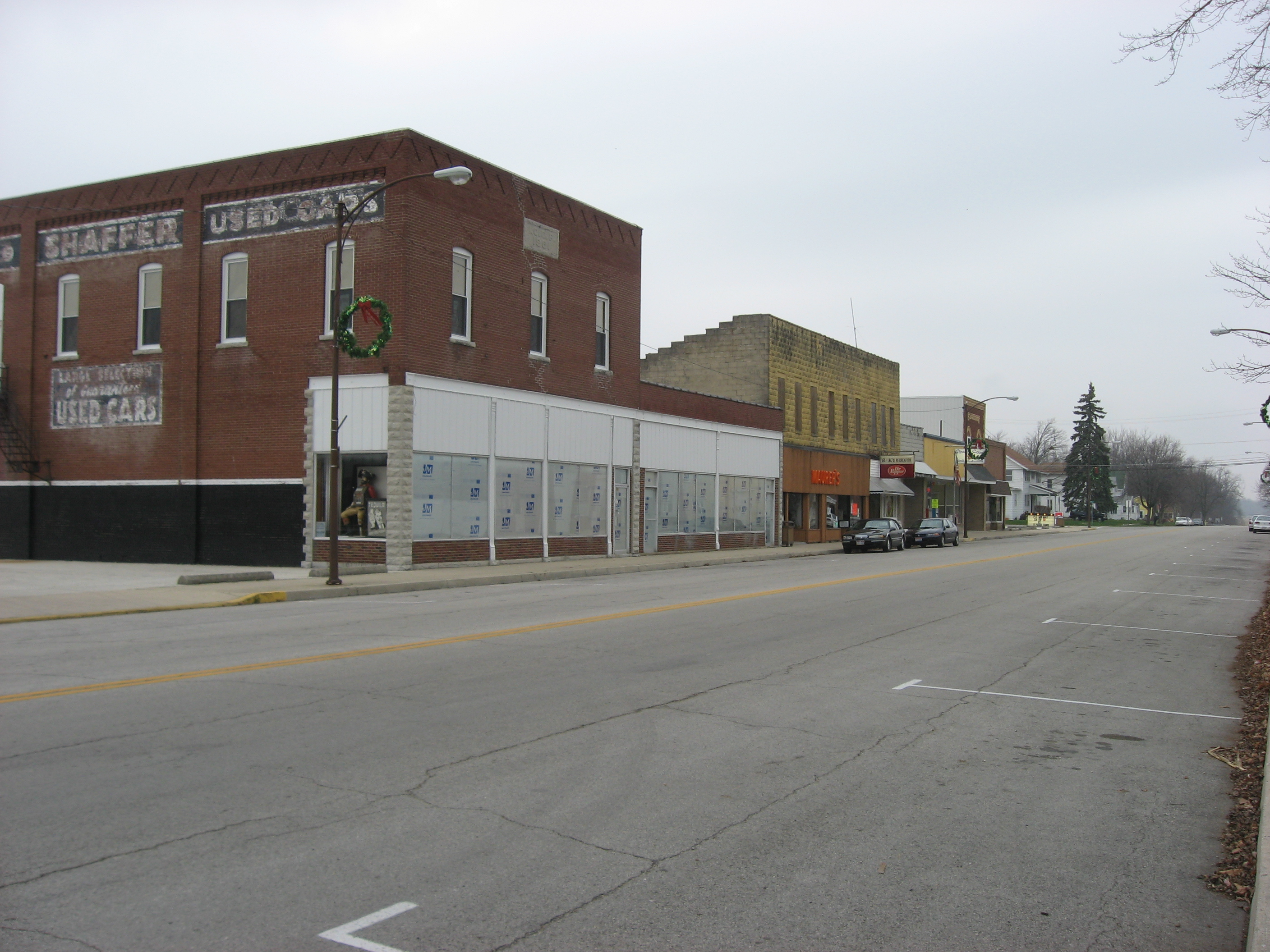
- Downtown Mendon

- Location in Mercer County and the state of Ohio.
- Coordinates: 40°40′24″N 84°31′03″W
- Country: United States
- State: Ohio
- County: Mercer
- Township: Union

Area
  - Total: 0.56 sq mi (1.44 km^{2})
  - Land: 0.54 sq mi (1.41 km^{2})
  - Water: 0.012 sq mi (0.03 km^{2})
- Elevation: 820 ft (250 m)

Population (2020)
  - Total: 628
  - Density: 1,151.5/sq mi (444.58/km^{2})
- Time zone: UTC-5 (Eastern (EST))
  - Summer (DST): UTC-4 (EDT)
- ZIP code: 45862
- Area code: 419
- FIPS code: 39-49042
- GNIS feature ID: 2399312
- Website: http://villageofmendon.com

Mendon is a village in Mercer County, Ohio, United States. The population was 628 at the 2020 census.

== History ==
Mendon was originally called Guilford, and under the latter name was platted in 1834. A post office called Mendon has been in operation since 1839.

Mendon's village hall, officially named the Mendon Town Hall, is listed on the National Register of Historic Places.

== Geography ==
According to the United States Census Bureau, the village has a total area of 0.57 square miles (1.48 km^{2}), of which 0.56 square miles (1.45 km^{2}) is land and 0.01 square miles (0.03 km^{2}) is water.

== Demographics ==
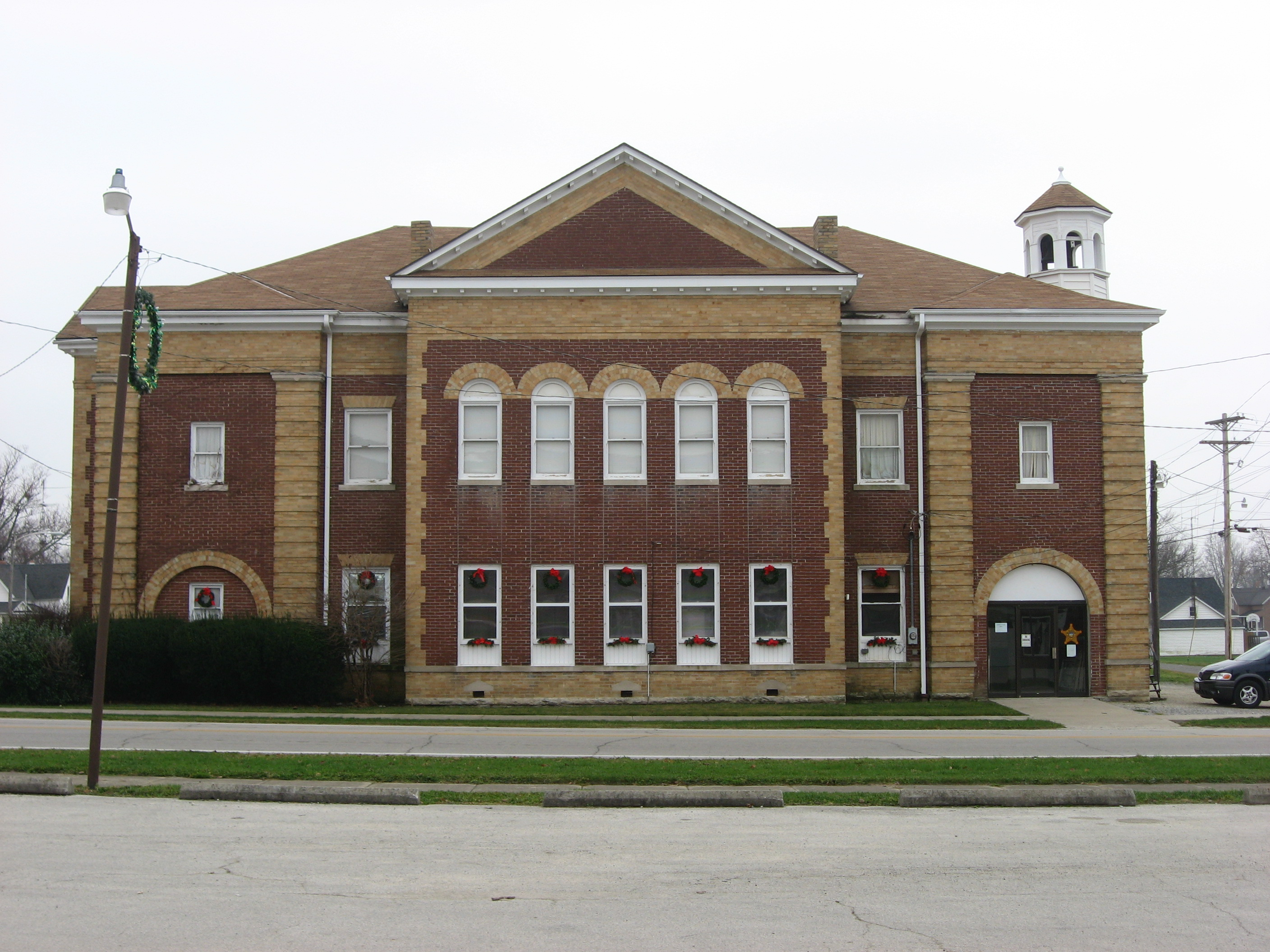
Mendon Union Town Hall

Historical population
Census	Pop.	Note	%±
1870	164		—
1880	242		47.6%
1890	400		65.3%
1900	599		49.8%
1910	621		3.7%
1920	571		−8.1%
1930	502		−12.1%
1940	547		9.0%
1950	614		12.2%
1960	663		8.0%
1970	672		1.4%
1980	749		11.5%
1990	717		−4.3%
2000	697		−2.8%
2010	662		−5.0%
2020	628		−5.1%
U.S. Decennial Census

=== 2010 census ===
As of the census of 2010, there were 662 people, 255 households, and 182 families living in the village. The population density was 1,182.1 inhabitants per square mile (456.4/km^{2}). There were 288 housing units at an average density of 514.3 per square mile (198.6/km^{2}). The racial makeup of the village was 97.1% White, 0.3% African American, 0.9% Native American, 0.3% Pacific Islander, and 1.4% from two or more races. Hispanic or Latino of any race were 1.7% of the population.

There were 255 households, of which 32.9% had children under the age of 18 living with them, 57.3% were married couples living together, 8.6% had a female householder with no husband present, 5.5% had a male householder with no wife present, and 28.6% were non-families. 22.7% of all households were made up of individuals, and 10.2% had someone living alone who was 65 years of age or older. The average household size was 2.60 and the average family size was 2.97.

The median age in the village was 38.3 years. 25.2% of residents were under the age of 18; 8.5% were between the ages of 18 and 24; 25.2% were from 25 to 44; 28.4% were from 45 to 64; and 12.5% were 65 years of age or older. The gender makeup of the village was 50.0% male and 50.0% female.

=== 2000 census ===
As of the census of 2000, there were 697 people, 262 households, and 190 families living in the village. The population density was 1,837.3 inhabitants per square mile (709.4/km^{2}). There were 278 housing units at an average density of 732.8 per square mile (282.9/km^{2}). The racial makeup of the village was 99.14% White, 0.57% Native American, 0.14% from other races, and 0.14% from two or more races. Hispanic or Latino of any race were 1.00% of the population.

There were 262 households, out of which 34.7% had children under the age of 18 living with them, 58.8% were married couples living together, 8.0% had a female householder with no husband present, and 27.1% were non-families. 22.5% of all households were made up of individuals, and 10.3% had someone living alone who was 65 years of age or older. The average household size was 2.66 and the average family size was 3.10.

In the village, the population was spread out, with 28.0% under the age of 18, 9.0% from 18 to 24, 29.0% from 25 to 44, 21.4% from 45 to 64, and 12.6% who were 65 years of age or older. The median age was 34 years. For every 100 females there were 102.0 males. For every 100 females age 18 and over, there were 97.6 males.

The median income for a household in the village was $34,231, and the median income for a family was $39,722. Males had a median income of $31,563 versus $22,727 for females. The per capita income for the village was $15,301. About 2.6% of families and 5.3% of the population were below the poverty line, including 7.0% of those under age 18 and none of those age 65 or over.

== Education ==
Mendon has a public library, a branch of the Mercer County District Library.
