= Mercer County, Ohio =

County in Ohio, United States

- County
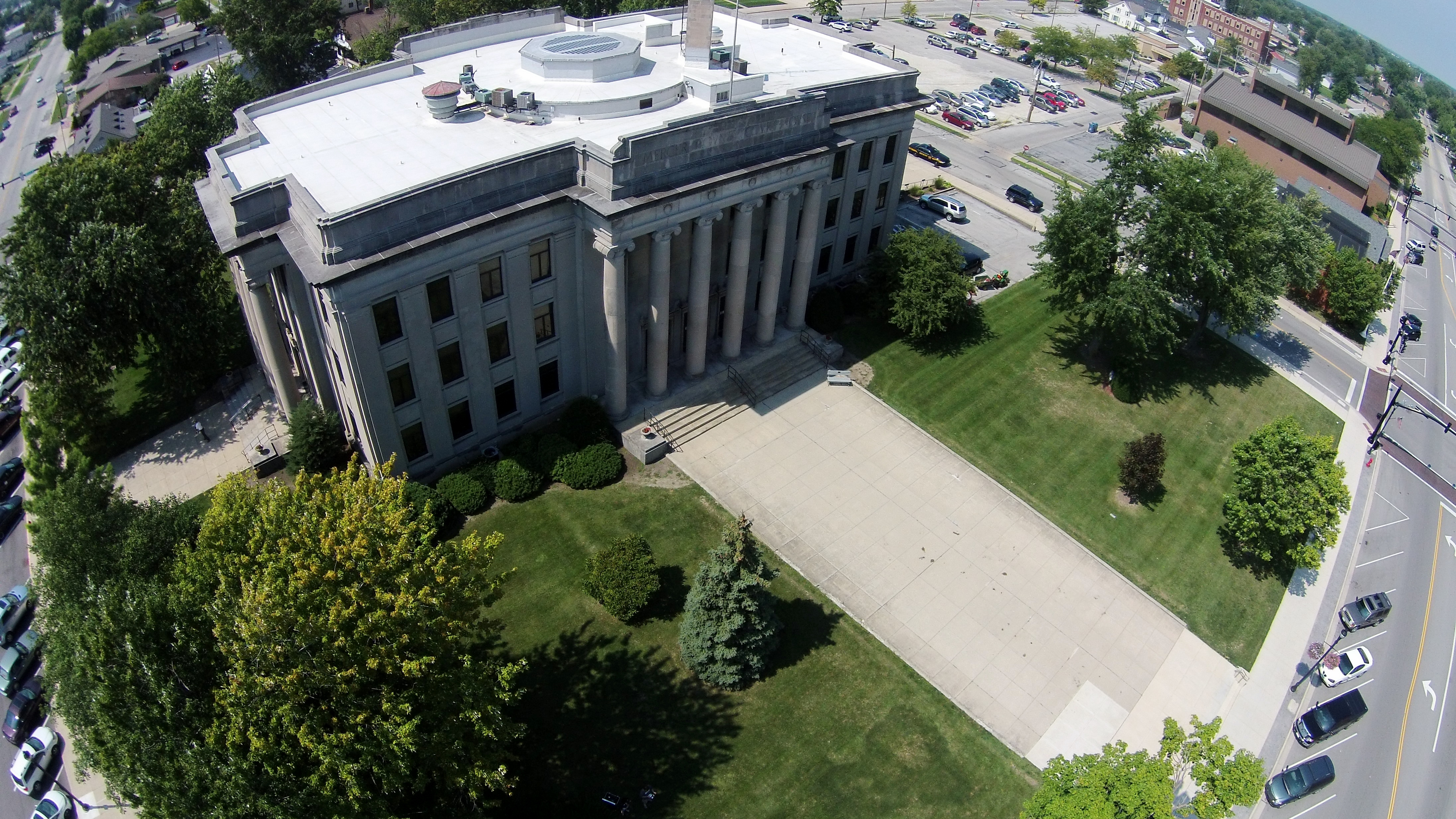
- Mercer County Courthouse

- Flag Seal

- Location within the U.S. state of Ohio
- Coordinates: 40°32′N 84°38′W
- Country: United States
- State: Ohio
- Founded: January 2, 1824
- Named for: Hugh Mercer
- Seat: Celina
- Largest city: Celina

Area
  - Total: 473 sq mi (1,230 km^{2})
  - Land: 462 sq mi (1,200 km^{2})
  - Water: 11 sq mi (28 km^{2}) 2.3%

Population (2020)
  - Total: 42,528
  - Estimate (2025): 42,737 ▲
  - Density: 90/sq mi (35/km^{2})
- Time zone: UTC−5 (Eastern)
  - Summer (DST): UTC−4 (EDT)
- Congressional district: 5th
- Website: www.mercercountyohio.gov

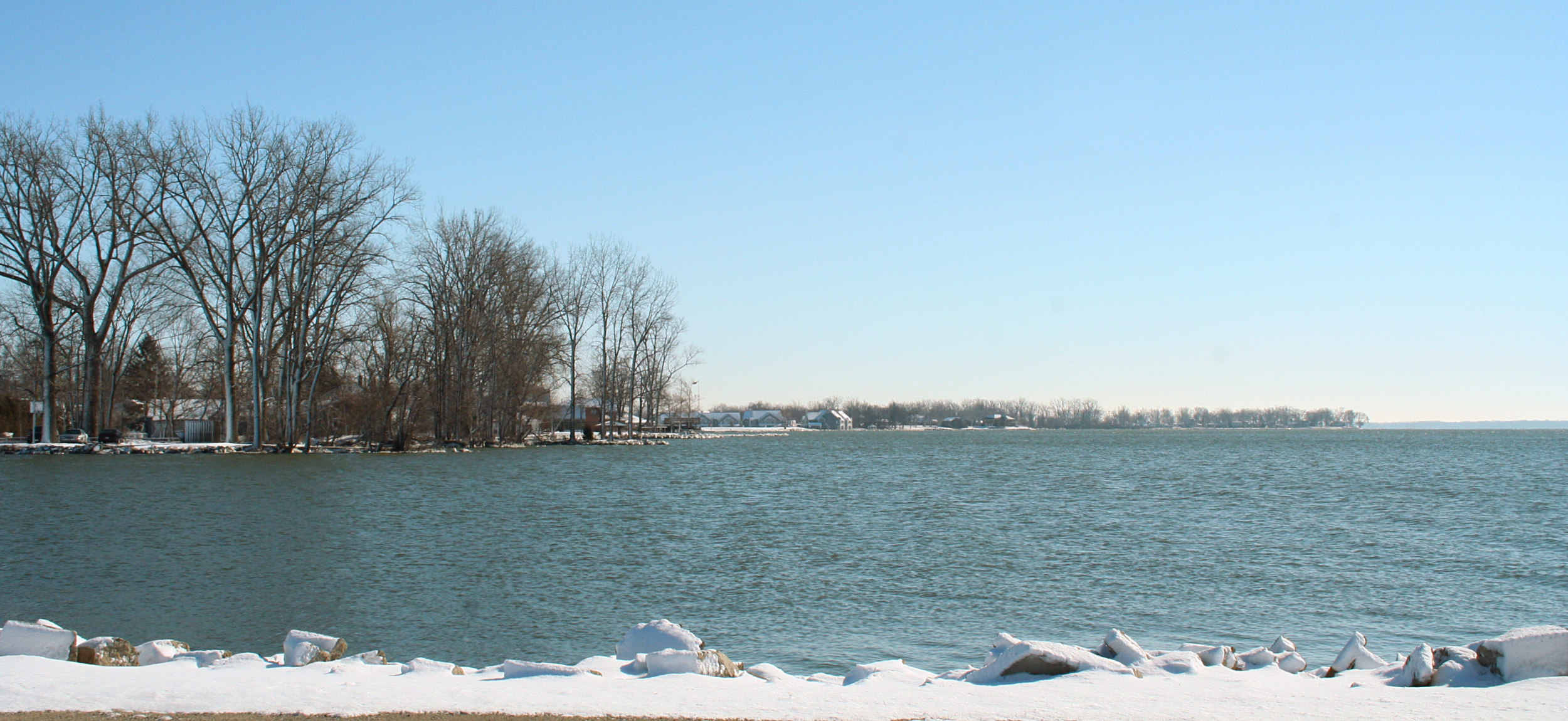
Grand Lake St. Marys State Park

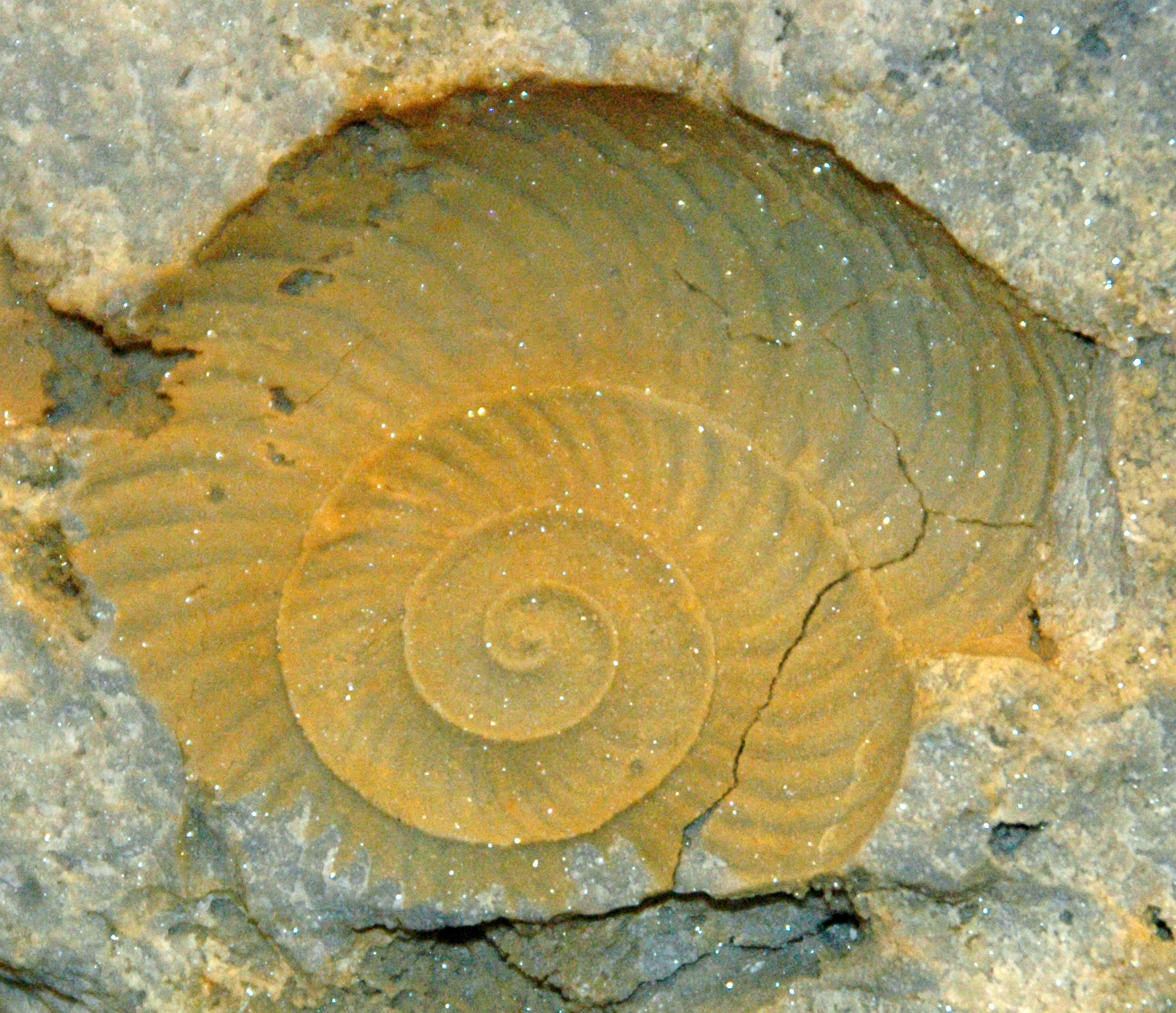
Graftonoceras fossil nautiloid, found near Coldwater, southern Mercer County.

Mercer County is located in the U.S. state of Ohio. As of the 2020 census, the population was 42,528. Its county seat is Celina. The county was created in 1820 and later organized in 1824. It is named for Hugh Mercer, an officer in the American Revolutionary War.

Mercer County comprises the Celina, Ohio Micropolitan Statistical Area.

== History ==
Mercer County was created in 1820 from land that had been attached to Darke and Shelby counties. Land south of the Greenville Treaty Line was still part of Darke County. An act establishing and fully organizing Mercer County took place on January 2, 1824. In 1837 Van Wert County was detached and the county line established is the current northern border of Mercer County. In 1839 Celina was established as the seat of Mercer County; St. Marys was the previous seat. In 1848 the area south of the Greenville Treaty Line to the current southern county line, was attached. When Auglaize County was formed, Mercer County's eastern border was moved 6 miles (9.7 km) west with the exception of the area south of the Greenville Treaty Line. This created the sharp point at Mercer County's southeast corner and was the last county line modification.

In the mid to late 1800s, Mercer County became home to many German immigrant farming families. Many of these German Americans had immigrated from northwestern Germany.

== Geography ==
According to the U.S. Census Bureau, the county has a total area of 473 square miles (1,230 km^{2}), of which 462 square miles (1,200 km^{2}) is land and 11 square miles (28 km^{2}) (2.3%) is water. The entire county has an elevation difference of less than 300 feet. The highest point is on the southern county line at 1071 feet above sea level. This is in proximity to the head waters for the Wabash River. The lowest point in the county is 780 feet above sea level. This point is located on the northern county line where the St. Marys River crosses over.

=== Drainage basins ===
Mercer County has two rivers running through it; the Wabash and the St. Marys. The Wabash watershed is part of the Gulf of Mexico’s watershed. The St. Marys watershed is part of Lake Erie's watershed. Creeks between these two watersheds are within a mile of each other at some places in Mercer County. The summit line that divides the drainage basins is known as the St. Lawrence Continental Divide

==== Beaver Creek ====
Beaver Creek is the longest and largest creek in Mercer County. It stretches 19.7 miles and has two sections. The first section begins in southern farmland in the county and flows through the town of Montezuma, Ohio and into Grand Lake. The other section of the creek begins as a spillway and empties into the Wabash River. Beaver Creek was originally one piece, but was split into two sections after the construction of Grand Lake. The creeks' spillway, and last section, has been the subject of controversy and multimillion-dollar lawsuits. Farmers along Beaver Creek claim their land floods because of the spillway that was put up in 1997, replacing the previous spillway, built in 1913.

== Government ==
Mercer County has a 3-member Board of County Commissioners that oversee the various County departments, similar to all but 2 of the 88 Ohio counties. Mercer County's elected commissioners are: Jerry Laffin, Rick Muhlenkamp, and David Buschur.

== Adjacent counties ==
- Adams County, Indiana (northwest)
- Van Wert County (north)
- Auglaize County (east)
- Shelby County (southeast)
- Darke County (south)
- Jay County, Indiana (southwest)

== Demographics ==
Historical population
Census	Pop.	Note	%±
1820	95		—
1830	1,110		1,068.4%
1840	8,277		645.7%
1850	7,712		−6.8%
1860	14,104		82.9%
1870	17,254		22.3%
1880	21,808		26.4%
1890	27,220		24.8%
1900	28,021		2.9%
1910	27,536		−1.7%
1920	26,872		−2.4%
1930	25,096		−6.6%
1940	26,256		4.6%
1950	28,311		7.8%
1960	32,559		15.0%
1970	35,265		8.3%
1980	38,334		8.7%
1990	39,443		2.9%
2000	40,924		3.8%
2010	40,814		−0.3%
2020	42,528		4.2%
2025 (est.)	42,737	▲	0.5%
U.S. Decennial Census; 1790–1960 1900–1990; 1990–2000 2020

=== 2020 census ===
As of the 2020 census, the county had a population of 42,528. The median age was 39.1 years. 25.5% of residents were under the age of 18 and 18.5% of residents were 65 years of age or older. For every 100 females there were 102.6 males, and for every 100 females age 18 and over there were 101.1 males age 18 and over.

The racial makeup of the county was 94.2% White, 0.5% Black or African American, 0.2% American Indian and Alaska Native, 0.4% Asian, 1.3% Native Hawaiian and Pacific Islander, 0.8% from some other race, and 2.6% from two or more races. Hispanic or Latino residents of any race comprised 2.2% of the population.

28.4% of residents lived in urban areas, while 71.6% lived in rural areas.

There were 16,288 households in the county, of which 30.2% had children under the age of 18 living in them. Of all households, 58.0% were married-couple households, 17.1% were households with a male householder and no spouse or partner present, and 19.2% were households with a female householder and no spouse or partner present. About 26.0% of all households were made up of individuals and 12.2% had someone living alone who was 65 years of age or older.

There were 17,888 housing units, of which 8.9% were vacant. Among occupied housing units, 78.0% were owner-occupied and 22.0% were renter-occupied. The homeowner vacancy rate was 0.8% and the rental vacancy rate was 4.8%.

== Economy ==
Manufacturing and health care are major components of Mercer County’s economy, together accounting for a large share of local employment.

The county is home to Totally Promotional, an online manufacturer and retailer of customized promotional products headquartered in Coldwater; founded in 1993, the firm employed about 230 people as of 2023. Other employers headquartered or operating in Mercer County include Celina Insurance Group, based in the county seat of Celina; Celina Aluminum Precision Technology (CAPT), a Honda supplier in Celina that announced a $59.1 million investment in 2024 to support battery-electric vehicle parts; Fort Recovery Industries, a zinc and aluminum die-casting manufacturer in Fort Recovery; J&M Manufacturing, a producer of grain handling equipment in Fort Recovery; Celina Tent, a maker of engineered fabric structures and event equipment in Celina with past U.S. Department of Defense contracts; VAL-CO/Val-Co Pax, which manufactures poultry and swine production equipment in Coldwater; and Basic Grain Products, a snack-foods producer operating in Coldwater.

Mercer Health operates the county’s primary hospital, Mercer County Community Hospital, in Coldwater, with additional campuses and clinics across the county.

=== 2020 census ===
Mercer County, Ohio – Racial and ethnic composition Note: the US Census treats Hispanic/Latino as an ethnic category. This table excludes Latinos from the racial categories and assigns them to a separate category. Hispanics/Latinos may be of any race.
Race / ethnicity (NH = Non-Hispanic)	Pop 1980	Pop 1990	Pop 2000	Pop 2010	Pop 2020	% 1980	% 1990	% 2000	% 2010	% 2020
White alone (NH)	37,897	38,972	40,014	39,453	39,752	98.86%	98.81%	97.78%	96.67%	93.47%
Black or African American alone (NH)	16	12	39	91	191	0.04%	0.03%	0.10%	0.22%	0.45%
Native American or Alaska Native alone (NH)	24	74	94	83	63	0.06%	0.19%	0.23%	0.20%	0.15%
Asian alone (NH)	53	98	113	180	189	0.14%	0.25%	0.28%	0.44%	0.44%
Native Hawaiian or Pacific Islander alone (NH)	x	x	7	68	564	x	x	0.02%	0.17%	1.33%
Other race alone (NH)	30	7	5	18	78	0.08%	0.02%	0.01%	0.04%	0.18%
Mixed race or Multiracial (NH)	x	x	182	307	763	x	x	0.44%	0.75%	1.79%
Hispanic or Latino (any race)	314	280	470	614	928	0.82%	0.71%	1.15%	1.50%	2.18%
Total	38,334	39,443	40,924	40,814	42,528	100.00%	100.00%	100.00%	100.00%	100.00%

=== 2010 census ===
As of the 2010 United States census, there were 40,814 people, 15,532 households, and 11,172 families living in the county. The population density was 88.3 inhabitants per square mile (34.1/km^{2}). There were 17,633 housing units at an average density of 38.1 units per square mile (14.7 units/km^{2}). The racial makeup of the county was 97.4% white, 0.4% Asian, 0.2% Pacific islander, 0.2% American Indian, 0.2% black or African American, 0.6% from other races, and 0.9% from two or more races. Those of Hispanic or Latino origin made up 1.5% of the population. In terms of ancestry, 58.7% were German, 8.8% were American, 8.3% were Irish, and 6.2% were English.

Of the 15,532 households, 32.6% had children under the age of 18 living with them, 60.1% were married couples living together, 7.6% had a female householder with no husband present, 28.1% were non-families, and 24.5% of all households were made up of individuals. The average household size was 2.60 and the average family size was 3.11. The median age was 39.4 years.

The median income for a household in the county was $49,719 and the median income for a family was $60,215. Males had a median income of $42,441 versus $31,069 for females. The per capita income for the county was $22,348. About 6.3% of families and 8.3% of the population were below the poverty line, including 8.9% of those under age 18 and 7.7% of those age 65 or over.

=== 2000 census ===
As of the census of 2010, there were 40,814 people, 14,756 households, and 11,022 families living in the county. The population density was 88 inhabitants per square mile (34/km^{2}). There were 15,875 housing units at an average density of 34 units per square mile (13/km^{2}). The racial makeup of the county was 98.44% White, 0.10% Black or African American, 0.26% Native American, 0.29% Asian, 0.02% Pacific Islander, 0.34% from other races, and 0.56% from two or more races. 1.15% of the population were Hispanic or Latino of any race.

There were 14,756 households, out of which 37.10% had children under the age of 18 living with them, 64.10% were married couples living together, 7.40% had a female householder with no husband present, and 25.30% were non-families. 22.70% of all households were made up of individuals, and 10.80% had someone living alone who was 65 years of age or older. The average household size was 2.74 and the average family size was 3.24.

In the county, the population was spread out, with 29.60% under the age of 18, 7.90% from 18 to 24, 26.70% from 25 to 44, 21.20% from 45 to 64, and 14.50% who were 65 years of age or older. The median age was 36 years. For every 100 females there were 99.80 males. For every 100 females age 18 and over, there were 96.20 males.

The median income for a household in the county was $42,742, and the median income for a family was $50,157. Males had a median income of $35,508 versus $22,857 for females. The per capita income for the county was $18,531. About 4.60% of families and 6.40% of the population were below the poverty line, including 6.90% of those under age 18 and 7.80% of those age 65 or over.

== Politics ==
Prior to 1940, Mercer County was primarily Democratic, only voting Republican once from 1856 to 1936 for Ohioan Warren G. Harding in 1920. From 1940 to 1968, the county was a Republican-leaning swing county, voting for Republican candidates four times and Democratic candidates three times, although John F. Kennedy came within 5 votes of carrying it in 1960. The 1972 election began the county's streak of being a Republican stronghold presidentially, with the party's margins of victory increasing to well over 50 percent in recent elections.

United States presidential election results for Mercer County, Ohio
Year	Republican		Democratic		Third party(ies)	
Year	No.	%	No.	%	No.	%
1856	629	33.07%	1,159	60.94%	114	5.99%
1860	832	34.01%	1,606	65.66%	8	0.33%
1864	834	30.21%	1,927	69.79%	0	0.00%
1868	884	26.97%	2,394	73.03%	0	0.00%
1872	1,026	32.65%	2,090	66.52%	26	0.83%
1876	1,128	28.39%	2,840	71.48%	5	0.13%
1880	1,473	30.33%	3,367	69.34%	16	0.33%
1884	1,384	26.95%	3,728	72.59%	24	0.47%
1888	1,841	30.01%	4,146	67.58%	148	2.41%
1892	1,526	25.86%	3,688	62.51%	686	11.63%
1896	1,991	29.16%	4,790	70.16%	46	0.67%
1900	2,015	30.69%	4,460	67.93%	91	1.39%
1904	2,173	38.70%	3,286	58.52%	156	2.78%
1908	2,148	31.92%	4,456	66.22%	125	1.86%
1912	1,324	23.30%	3,591	63.19%	768	13.51%
1916	2,065	33.81%	3,803	62.27%	239	3.91%
1920	5,692	56.13%	4,404	43.43%	44	0.43%
1924	4,215	40.40%	5,135	49.21%	1,084	10.39%
1928	5,129	45.29%	6,155	54.34%	42	0.37%
1932	3,314	27.78%	8,462	70.94%	153	1.28%
1936	3,602	27.28%	7,217	54.66%	2,385	18.06%
1940	7,905	60.72%	5,114	39.28%	0	0.00%
1944	7,712	63.04%	4,522	36.96%	0	0.00%
1948	5,266	47.01%	5,928	52.92%	8	0.07%
1952	9,058	65.72%	4,725	34.28%	0	0.00%
1956	9,456	68.88%	4,272	31.12%	0	0.00%
1960	7,735	50.02%	7,730	49.98%	0	0.00%
1964	4,373	30.25%	10,081	69.75%	0	0.00%
1968	6,313	44.43%	6,801	47.86%	1,095	7.71%
1972	8,587	57.60%	5,798	38.89%	522	3.50%
1976	7,678	51.71%	6,724	45.28%	447	3.01%
1980	8,673	56.54%	5,506	35.90%	1,160	7.56%
1984	11,542	71.49%	4,422	27.39%	180	1.11%
1988	11,162	68.54%	4,978	30.57%	146	0.90%
1992	8,683	46.82%	4,883	26.33%	4,979	26.85%
1996	8,832	50.03%	6,300	35.69%	2,521	14.28%
2000	12,485	68.25%	5,212	28.49%	597	3.26%
2004	15,650	74.92%	5,118	24.50%	122	0.58%
2008	15,100	70.90%	5,853	27.48%	346	1.62%
2012	16,561	76.40%	4,745	21.89%	370	1.71%
2016	17,506	80.24%	3,384	15.51%	926	4.24%
2020	19,452	81.79%	4,030	16.94%	302	1.27%
2024	19,710	82.72%	3,865	16.22%	251	1.05%

United States Senate election results for Mercer County, Ohio1
Year	Republican		Democratic		Third party(ies)	
Year	No.	%	No.	%	No.	%
2024	18,432	78.54%	4,337	18.48%	700	2.98%

== Communities ==
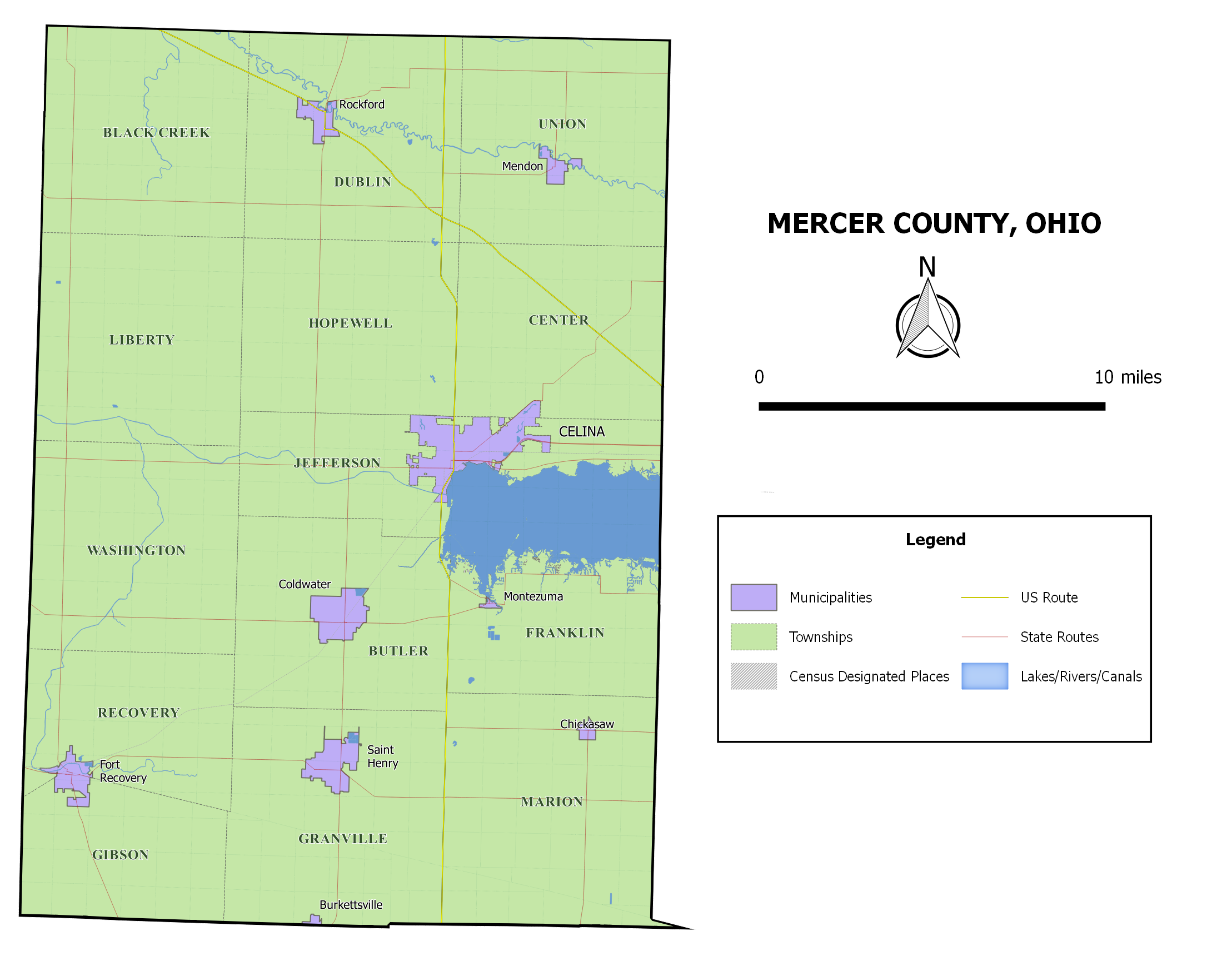

=== City ===
- Celina (county seat)

=== Villages ===
- Burkettsville (part)
- Chickasaw
- Coldwater
- Fort Recovery
- Mendon
- Montezuma
- Rockford
- St. Henry

=== Townships ===
- Black Creek
- Butler
- Center
- Dublin
- Franklin
- Gibson
- Granville
- Hopewell
- Jefferson
- Liberty
- Marion
- Recovery
- Union
- Washington
- Wayne (defunct, now part of Celina)

=== Census-designated place ===
- Maria Stein

=== Unincorporated communities ===
- Carthagena
- Cassella
- Chattanooga
- Cranberry Prairie
- Erastus
- Macedon
- Mercer
- Padua
- Sebastian
- Tama

== In popular culture ==
The county is the fictional setting of the Amazon Prime Video series Tales from the Loop.

== See also ==
- National Register of Historic Places listings in Mercer County, Ohio
