= List of Catholic churches in the United States =

This is a list of notable Catholic churches and cathedrals in the United States.

In the United States, there are more than 20,000 Catholic buildings. Among these numerous Catholic churches and cathedrals are notable. Notable ones include any that are listed on the National Register of Historic Places or on state and local historic registers.

There are 193 current Catholic cathedrals in the U.S., listed at List of the Catholic cathedrals of the United States. Another 74 basilicas—some are also cathedrals—are notable as well (See List of basilicas). The following list, by state, is intended to includes all these cathedrals plus other active churches and notable former cathedrals and churches.

These include:

(by state then city or town)

== Alabama ==
| Church | Image | Dates | Location | City, state | Description |
|---|---|---|---|---|---|
| Cathedral of St Paul | | 1893 built 1982 NRHP-listed | 2120 3rd Ave. N33.51683°N 86.80509°W | Birmingham, Alabama | Cathedral of St. Paul Parish, the seat of the Diocese of Birmingham in Alabama. This diocese was split from the Archdiocese of Mobile in 1969. |
| Sacred Heart Catholic Church | | 1914–16 built Alabama Register-listed | 112 2nd Street S.E.34.17753°N 86.84133°W | Cullman, Alabama | Diocese of Birmingham in Alabama, parish church. Sacred Heart of Jesus Parish was established in 1877. |
| St. Leo's Catholic Church | | built 1905; Alabama Register-listed | W. Perry Street32.51342°N 87.83862°W | Demopolis, Alabama | Diocese of Birmingham in Alabama, parish church. Served as a mission until St. Leo the Great Parish was established in 1936. |
| St. Patrick's Catholic Church | | built 1924; 1988 NRHP-listed | E. side Parkway 9030.66277°N 88.05777°W | Loxley, Alabama | Archdiocese of Mobile, community church. Parish church is in Daphne. Christ the King Parish was established in 1896. |
| Cathedral Basilica of the Immaculate Conception | | built 1833–84, consecrated 1850 | 2 South Claiborne Street30.69019°N 88.04568°W | Mobile, Alabama | Immaculate Conception Parish, the seat of the Archdiocese of Mobile. The first parish of Mobile was erected on July 20, 1703, by Jean-Baptiste de la Croix de Chevrières de Saint-Vallier, Bishop of Quebec. |
| Most Pure Heart of Mary Catholic Church | | built 1908 | Martin Luther King Jr. Avenue & Alamsted Street30.69598°N 88.05301°W | Mobile, Alabama | Archdiocese of Mobile, parish church. Most Pure Heart of Mary Parish was established in 1899. It was organized to serve Mobile's African American community during the Jim Crow era. Priests and nuns from the parish participated in boycotts and demonstrations in support of the community during the Civil Rights struggle. The church was a primary public meeting place for the Neighborhood Organized Workers (NOW) organization, founded in Mobile in July 1966 with a mission focused on achieving full equality. |
| St. Francis Xavier Roman Catholic Church | | built 1916; 1991 NRHP-listed | 2034 St. Stephens Road30.70916°N 88.08027°W | Mobile, Alabama | Archdiocese of Mobile, parish church. St. Francis Xavier Parish was established in 1868. |
| St. Joseph's Roman Catholic Church | | built 1907; 1991 NRHP-listed | 1703 Dublin Street30.68972°N 88.05388°W | Mobile, Alabama | Archdiocese of Mobile, parish church. St. Joseph's Parish was established in 1857. |
| St. Matthew's Catholic Church | | built 1913; 1991 NRHP-listed | 1200 South Marine Street30.66277°N 88.05777°W | Mobile, Alabama | Archdiocese of Mobile, parish church. St. Matthew Parish was established in 1904. |
| St. Vincent de Paul now Prince of Peace Church | | built 1877; 1992 NRHP-listed | 351 South Lawrence Street30.68241°N 88.04512°W | Mobile, Alabama | Archdiocese of Mobile, parish church. The original St. Vincent de Paul Parish was established in 1847 for what was then a large Irish community. It was combined with another parish and became the Prince of Peace Parish in 1970. |
| St. Jude Catholic Church | | built 1938; 1990 NRHP-listed as part of the City of St. Jude | 2048 W. Fairview Avenue32.35292°N 86.32714°W | Montgomery, Alabama | Archdiocese of Mobile, parish church. St. Jude Parish was established in 1934. |

== Alaska ==
| Church | Image | Dates | Location | City, state | Description |
|---|---|---|---|---|---|
| Holy Family Old Cathedral | | 1948 built | 811 W. Sixth Avenue; 61°13′2.53″N 149°53′52.69″W | Anchorage, Alaska | Romanesque Revival |
| Our Lady of Guadalupe Cathedral | | 2005 built | 3900 Wisconsin St. 61°11′5.74″N 149°56′38.56″W | Anchorage, Alaska | Mission Revival |
| Immaculate Conception Church | | 1904 built 1976 NRHP-listed | 115 N. Cushman St. 64°50′44″N 147°43′11″W | Fairbanks, Alaska | First cathedral of the Diocese of Fairbanks |
| Sacred Heart Cathedral | | 1966 built | 2501 Airport Way; 64°50′11″N 147°46′50″W | Fairbanks, Alaska | |
| Co-Cathedral of the Nativity of the Blessed Virgin Mary | | 1910 built | 416 Fifth Street; 58°18′12.19″N 134°24′30.04″W | Juneau, Alaska | smallest cathedral in the US |

== Arizona ==
| Church | Image | Dates | Location | City, state | Description |
|---|---|---|---|---|---|
| St. Patrick's Church | | 1915 built 1995 NRHP-listed | Oak Ave., on Higgins Hill; 31°26′40″N 109°55′19″W | Bisbee, Arizona | Late Gothic Revival |
| Our Lady of Guadalupe Church | | 1926 built 1986 NRHP-listed | 302 S. Kendrick; 35°11′44″N 111°39′10″W | Flagstaff, Arizona | |
| Holy Angels Church | | 1916 built 1983 NRHP-listed | 231 S. Broad St. 33°23′41″N 110°47′8″W | Globe, Arizona | |
| St. Mary's Church | | 1906 built 1986 NRHP-listed | 3rd & Spring Streets35°11′30″N 114°3′11″W | Kingman, Arizona | Mission/Spanish Revival |
| Our Lady of the Blessed Sacrament Church | | 1917 built 2008 NRHP-listed | 844 Sullivan St. 33°23′50″N 110°52′29.2″W | Miami, Arizona | |
| Our Lady of Victory Church | | built 2004 NRHP-listed | Fronting 4th St., between Cedar and Spruce Sts. 31°54′15″N 109°49′19″W | Pearce, Arizona | |
| Cathedral of Saints Simon and Jude | | 1966 built | 6351 North 27th Ave. 33°31′47.28″N 112°6′58.32″W | Phoenix, Arizona | Modern |
| Immaculate Heart of Mary Church | | built 1993 NRHP-listed | 909 E. Washington St. 33°26′53″N 112°03′40″W | Phoenix, Arizona | |
| Sacred Heart Church | | built 2012 NRHP-listed | 920 S. 17th St. 33°26′04″N 112°03′22″W | Phoenix, Arizona | |
| St. Mary's Basilica | | 1902 built 1978 NRHP-listed | 231 North 3rd St. 33°27′2.48″N 112°4′6.26″W | Phoenix, Arizona | Mission Revival/Spanish Colonial Revival |
| Sacred Heart Church | | 1894 built 1978 NRHP-listed | 208 N. Marina St. 34°32′38.59″N 112°28′3.2″W | Prescott, Arizona | Late Gothic Revival; church and rectory are both listed on the National Register of Historic Places |
| St. Mary's Church-Our Lady of Mount Carmel Catholic Church | | 1903 built 1978 NRHP-listed | College & University Avenue; 33°25′20″N 111°56′4″W | Tempe, Arizona | Romanesque |
| Sacred Heart Church | | 1881 built 2002 NRHP-listed | 516 Safford St. 31°42′50.8″N 110°3′50.95″W | Tucson, Arizona | Gothic Revival |
| Cathedral of St. Augustine | | 1968 built | 192 S. Stone Ave. 32°13′10″N 110°58′17.33″W | Tucson, Arizona | Mexican Baroque |
| Santa Cruz Church | | 1918 built 1994 NRHP-listed | 1220 S. Sixth Ave. 32°12′23″N 110°58′6″W | Tucson, Arizona | Mission/Spanish Revival |
| Mission San Xavier del Bac | | 1797 built 1966 NRHP-listed | 9 miles (14 km) south of Tucson via Mission Rd. 32°06′25″N 111°00′29″W | Tucson, Arizona | Mission/Spanish Colonial |
| St. Michael's Mission | | built 1975 NRHP-listed | North of Window Rock off State Route 264; 35°38′44″N 109°05′53″W | Window Rock, Arizona | |

== Arkansas ==
| Church | Image | Dates | Location | City, state | Description |
|---|---|---|---|---|---|
| Our Lady of Perpetual Help Church | | 1902 built 1978 NRHP-listed | St. Mary's Mountain; 35°27′8.33″N 93°45′30.06″W | Altus, Arkansas | Brown stone blocks; Roman Basilical |
| St. Richard's Church | | built 1992 NRHP-listed | Jct. of Hickory and Cleveland Sts. 35°18′42″N 91°34′14″W | Bald Knob, Arkansas | |
| St. John the Baptist Church | | 1929 built 1992 NRHP-listed | Jct. of New Orleans and W. Ash St., SW corner 34°53′7″N 91°11′35″W | Brinkley, Arkansas | Classical Revival |
| St. Elizabeth's Church | | 1912 built 2009 NRHP-listed | NE corner of Sycamore and Mason Sts. 34°47′1″N 91°27′34″W | DeValls Bluff, Arkansas | |
| St. Mary's Church | | 1935–36 built 2007 NRHP-listed | 123 Columbia; 34°31′22″N 90°35′31″W | Helena-West Helena, Arkansas | Launched architectural career of Charles Eames; Late Gothic Revival |
| Marylake Carmelite Monastery | | 1952 built | 5151 Marylake Drive; 34°32′19.51″N 92°20′26.02″W | Little Rock, Arkansas | Discalced Carmelites |
| Cathedral of St. Andrew | | 1881 built 1986 NRHP-listed | 617 South Louisiana Street; 34°44′33″N 92°16′20″W | Little Rock, Arkansas | Gothic Revival |
| St. Edward's Church | | 1901 built 1982 NRHP-listed | 823 Sherman; 34°44′23″N 92°15′54″W | Little Rock, Arkansas | Gothic Revival |
| St. Agnes Church | | built NRHP-listed | 203 Eighth St. 34°35′10.84″N 94°14′34.32″W | Mena, Arkansas | |
| Immaculate Heart of Mary Church | | 1932 built 1982 NRHP-listed | North of North Little Rock off Highway 365; 34°52′36″N 92°20′32″W | North Little Rock, Arkansas | Gothic Revival |
| St. Mary's Church | | 1935 built 2015 NRHP-listed | 301 W. Highland; 36°03′39″N 90°29′15″W | Paragould, Arkansas | Romanesque Revival; Charles Eames, architect |
| St. Anthony's Church | | built 1986 NRHP-listed | North of Arkansas Highway 22; 35°18′48″N 93°52′55″W | Ratcliff, Arkansas | |
| St. Joseph Church | | 1939 built 2006 NRHP-listed | 110 E. Henri de Tonti Blvd. 36°10′43″N 94°14′6″W | Tontitown, Arkansas | Gothic Revival |
| St. Luke's Church | | 1907 built 1998 NRHP-listed | 508 W. Pine; 33°37′4″N 92°4′54″W | Warren, Arkansas | Gothic Revival |

== California ==
| Church | Image | Dates | Location | City, state | Description |
|---|---|---|---|---|---|
| St. Joseph's Basilica | | 1921 built 1978 NRHP-listed | 1109 Chestnut Street | Alameda, California | Spanish Colonial Revival |
| Sacred Heart Church | | 1883 built 1983 NRHP-listed | 507 E. 4th St. 41°29′13″N 120°32′8″W | Alturas, California | Gothic Revival |
| Old Santa Rosa Catholic Church | | 1870 built 1982 NRHP-listed | Main St. 35°33′58″N 121°4′48″W | Cambria, California | Classical Revival |
| Rectory, Catholic Church of the Assumption | | 1982 NRHP-listed (rectory) | 563 Ocean Ave. 33°47′14.6″N 117°53′56.2″W | Ferndale, California | Eastlake Stick and Queen Anne (rectory) |
| St. John's Cathedral | | 1903 built | 2814 Mariposa St. 36°44′26″N 119°46′57″W | Fresno, California | Gothic Revival; Cathedral of the Diocese of Fresno |
| Christ Cathedral | | 1980 built | 13280 Chapman Ave. 33°46′47″N 117°51′13″W | Garden Grove, California | Postmodern; Built as the Crystal Cathedral for what is now Shepherd's Grove; became the cathedral of the Diocese of Orange in 2019. |
| St. Louis Church | | 1854 built 1979 NRHP-listed | La Grange Rd. and Floto St. 37°39′46″N 120°27′39″W | La Grange, California | Greek Revival, Vernacular Greek Revival |
| Cathedral of Our Lady of the Angels | | 2002 built | 555 West Temple Street; 34°3′30″N 118°14′45″W | Los Angeles | contemporary modern; the mother church of Archdiocese of Los Angeles |
| Catholic-Protestant Chapels, Veterans Administration Center | | 1900 built 1972 NRHP-listed | 34°3′18″N 118°27′19″W | Los Angeles | Carpenter Gothics, Romanesque Revival |
| Precious Blood Church | | 1926 built | 435 S. Occidental Blvd | Los Angeles | Italian Romanesque |
| St. Anne Melkite Catholic Cathedral | | 1965 built | 11211 Moorpark Street; 34°09′02.7″N 118°22′32.4″W | Los Angeles | contemporary modern; co-cathedral of the Melkite Greek Catholic Eparchy of Newton |
| St. Cecilia Church | | 1927 built | 4230 South Normandie Avenue | Los Angeles | Lombard Romanesque |
| St. Thomas the Apostle Church | | 1904 built | 1321 S. Mariposa Avenue | Los Angeles | Mission Revival |
| St. Vincent de Paul Church | | 1925 built 1971 LA Historical-Cultural Monument-listed | 621 W. Adams Blvd | Los Angeles | Baroque style |
| St. Joseph Church | | 1927 built 1991 NRHP-listed | 4983-85 Bullion St. 37°28′57″N 119°57′37″W | Mariposa, California | Bungalow/craftsman, Gothic Revival |
| Cathedral of San Carlos Borromeo | | 1794 built 1966 NRHP-listed | 550 Church Street | Monterey, California | Known as Royal Presidio Chapel; Spanish Colonial Style |
| Cathedral of Christ the Light | | 2008 built | 2121 Harrison Street | Oakland, California | Modern |
| Holy Family Church | | 1961 built | 566 S. Glassell St. 33°46′47″N 117°51′13″W | Orange, California | Modern; first cathedral of the Diocese of Orange (1976–2019) |
| Cathedral of the Blessed Sacrament | | 1889 built | 1017 11th Street | Sacramento, California | Italian Renaissance |
| St. Helena Church | | 1945 built 1978 NRHP-listed | Oak and Tainter Sts. 38°30′13″N 122°28′9″W | St. Helena, California | English Gothic & Jacobean |
| Our Lady of the Rosary Cathedral | | 1928 built | 265 W. 25th St. 34°08′20″N 117°17′21″W | San Bernardino, California | Mission Revival; Cathedral of the Diocese of San Bernardino |
| Mission San Diego de Alcalá | | 1808 built 1970 NRHP-listed | 10818 San Diego Mission Road | San Diego | Spanish Colonial; became a basilica in 1976 |
| St. Joseph Cathedral | | 1941 built | 1535 Third Avenue | San Diego | Mission Revival |
| Cathedral of Saint Mary of the Assumption | | 1971 built | 1111 Gough Street | San Francisco | Structural Expressionist Modern; the seat of Archdiocese of San Francisco |
| Mission San Francisco de Asís | | 1791 built(chapel), 1918 built(basilica); 1972 NRHP-listed | 320 Dolores Street | San Francisco | Known as Mission Dolores; the oldest surviving structure in San Francisco |
| Old Saint Mary's Cathedral | | California Historic Landmark Ref.No. 810 | 660 California Street | San Francisco | 1854-1891 the seat of Archdiocese of San Francisco |
| St. Ignatius Church | | 1914 built | University of San Francisco | San Francisco | Italian Renaissance, Baroque |
| St. Anne of the Sunset Church | | 1932 built | 850 Judah Street | San Francisco | Romanesque |
| St. Joseph's Church | | 1914 built 1982 NRHP-listed | 1401 Howard Street | San Francisco | Romanesque |
| St. Patrick's Church | | 1968 San Francisco Designated Landmark | 756 Mission Street | San Francisco | Gothic |
| Cathedral Basilica of St. Joseph | | 1875-1885 built 1977 NRHP-listed | 80 South Market Street; 37°20′3″N 121°53′27″W | San Jose, California | Elevated to a cathedral in 1985, to a minor basilica in 1997. |
| Mission Basilica San Juan Capistrano | | 1986 built | 31522 Camino Capistrano. 33°30′15″N 117°39′48″W | San Juan Capistrano, California | Designated minor basilica 2000, national shrine 2003 |
| Our Lady of Sorrows Church, Santa Barbara | | 1929 built 2016 Santa Barbara Designated Landmark | 21 East Sola Street; 34°25′34.85″N 119°42′21.99″W | Santa Barbara, California | Spanish Colonial Revival |
| Cathedral of St. Eugene | | | 2323 Montgomery Dr. 38°26′50″N 122°41′16″W | Santa Rosa, California | Modern; Cathedral of the Diocese of Santa Rosa |
| Sawyers Bar Catholic Church | | 1855 built 1978 NRHP-listed | Klamath National Forest; 41°18′3″N 123°8′10″W | Sawyers Bar, California | |
| Cathedral of the Annunciation | | 1942 built | 400 W. Rose St. 37°57′47″N 121°17′59″W | Stockton, California | Gothic Revival; Cathedral of the Diocese of Stockton |

== Colorado ==
| Church | Image | Dates | Location | City, state | Description |
|---|---|---|---|---|---|
| Sacred Heart Church | | built 1922; 1998 NRHP-listed | 727 4th Street; 37°28′11″N 105°52′4″W | Alamosa, Colorado | Mission/Spanish Revival |
| St. Mary's Cathedral | | built 1891; 1982 NRHP-listed | 26 W. Kiowa Street; 38°50′11″N 104°49′35″W | Colorado Springs, Colorado | Gothic |
| Annunciation Church | | built 1904; 1990 NRHP-listed | 3601 Humboldt Street; 39°46′2″N 104°58′11″W | Denver | Gothic Revival/Romanesque |
| Cathedral Basilica of the Immaculate Conception | | built 1911; 1975 NRHP-listed | 1530 Logan Street; 39°44′25″N 104°58′55″W | Denver | Gothic Revival |
| St. Dominic's Church | | built 1926; 1996 NRHP-listed | 3005 W. 29th Avenue; 39°45′32″N 105°1′31″W | Denver | Late Gothic Revival |
| St. Elizabeth's Church | | built 1898; 1969 NRHP-listed | 1062 11th Street; 39°44′34″N 105°0′6″W | Denver | German Gothic |
| St. Ignatius Loyola Church | | built 1924; 1994 NRHP-listed | Jct. of E. 23rd Ave. and York St. 39°45′5″N 104°57′35″W | Denver | Late Gothic Revival |
| St. Joseph's (Polish) Church | | built 1902; 1983 NRHP-listed | 517 E. 46th Avenue; 39°46′49″N 104°58′54″W | Denver | Gothic |
| St. Joseph's Church | | built 1888; 1982 NRHP-listed | 600 Galapago; 39°43′34″N 104°59′44″W | Denver | Gothic |
| St. Patrick Mission Church | | built 1907; 1979 NRHP-listed | 3325 Pecos Street; 39°45′49″N 105°0′23″W | Denver | Mission/Spanish Revival |
| Cathedral of the Sacred Heart | | built 1913; 1989 NRHP-listed | 414 W. 11th Street; 38°16′37.2″N 104°36′43.92″W | Pueblo, Colorado | Late Gothic Revival |
| St. Anthony's Church | | built 1911; 1982 NRHP-listed | 329 S. 3rd Street; 40°37′14″N 103°12′36″W | Sterling, Colorado | Romanesque |

== Connecticut ==
| Church | Image | Dates | Location | City, state | Description |
|---|---|---|---|---|---|
| St. Augustine Cathedral | | 1868 built | 359 Washington Ave. | Bridgeport, Connecticut | Gothic Revival; Patrick Keely, architect |
| Holy Trinity Lithuanian Church | | 1927 built | 53 Capitol Ave. | Hartford, Connecticut | |
| St. Patrick - St. Anthony Church | | 1859 built 1984 NRHP-listed | 285 Church Street | Hartford, Connecticut | |
| Cathedral of St. Joseph | | 1962 built | 140 Farmington Avenue | Hartford, Connecticut | One spire of 86m height |
| Cathedral of St. Patrick | | 1879 built 1989 NRHP-listed | 211 Broadway | Norwich, Connecticut | Gothic Revival |
| Basilica of Saint John the Evangelist | | 1868 built | 279 Atlantic St | Stamford, Connecticut | Gothic Revival |
| St. Mary's Church | | 1860 built 1987 NRHP-listed | 540 Elm St. | Stamford, Connecticut | |
| St. Vladimir's Cathedral | | 1957 built | 24 Wenzel Terrace | Stamford, Connecticut | Ukrainian Greek Catholic Church |
| Basilica of the Immaculate Conception | | 1928 built 1983 NRHP-listed | 74 W. Main St. | Waterbury, Connecticut | Italian Renaissance Revival |

== Delaware ==
| Church | Image | Dates | Location | City, state | Description |
|---|---|---|---|---|---|
| St. Joseph's Church | | 1884 built 1978 NRHP-listed | 15 W. Cochran St. 39°26′50″N 75°43′7″W | Middletown, Delaware | Late Gothic revival |
| St. John the Baptist Church | | 1883 built 1982 NRHP-listed | 200 E. Main St; 39°41′2″N 75°44′44″W | Newark, Delaware | Romanesque, Vernacular Romanesque |
| St. Anthony's Church | | 1924 built 1984 NRHP-listed | West 9th & North DuPont Streets; 39°45′10″N 75°33′59″W | Wilmington, Delaware | Romanesque Revival |
| St. Hedwig's Church | | 1904 built 1982 NRHP-listed | Linden and S. Harrison Sts. 39°44′25″N 75°33′58″W | Wilmington, Delaware | Gothic Revival |
| St. Joseph's Church | | 1947 built 2004 NRHP-listed | 1012 French St. 39°44′42″N 75°32′45″W | Wilmington, Delaware | Gothic revival |
| St. Mary of the Immaculate Conception Church | | 1858 built 1976 NRHP-listed | 6th and Pine Sts. 39°44′21″N 75°32′38″W | Wilmington, Delaware | Romanesque revival |
| Cathedral of Saint Peter | | 1818 built 1979 NRHP-listed | West 6th St. 39°44′34.7″N 75°33′11.56″W | Wilmington, Delaware | Romanesque Revival; A contributing property in the Quaker Hill Historic District |

== District of Columbia ==
| Church | Image | Dates | Location | City, state | Description |
|---|---|---|---|---|---|
| Basilica of the National Shrine of the Immaculate Conception | | built 1920–2017 | 400 Michigan Ave., NE; 38°56′0″N 77°0′02″W | Washington, D.C. | The shrine is the largest Catholic church in the United States, the eighth largest religious structure in the world, and the tallest building in Washington, D.C. |
| Cathedral of St. Matthew the Apostle | | built 1895; 1974 NRHP-listed | 1725 Rhode Island Ave., NW; 38°54′22″N 77°2′24″W | Washington, D.C. | Seat of the Archdiocese of Washington, which was created from the Archdiocese of Baltimore in 1947. The Renaissance Revival and Romanesque Revival structure was designed by New York architect Christopher Grant LaFarge. |
| Franciscan Monastery and Memorial Church of the Holy Land | | built 1898–1899; 1992 NRHP-listed | 1400 Quincy St. N.E. 38°56′15″N 76°59′7.1″W | Washington, D.C. | The complex includes a monastery, Neo-Byzantine style church, gardens, replicas of various shrines throughout Israel, a replica of the catacombs in Rome, an archive and a library. |
| Holy Trinity Church | | built 1829 | 3513 N Street, N.W. 38°54′25.2″N 77°4′13.08″W | Washington, D.C. | Parish of the Archdiocese of Washington. It was founded in 1794. |
| Immaculate Conception Church | | built 1870; 2003 NRHP-listed | 711 N Street, NW; 38°54′26″N 77°1′22″W | Washington, D.C. | Parish of the Archdiocese of Washington. It was founded in 1864. |
| St. Aloysius Church | | built 1857; 1973 NRHP-listed | 19 I St., NW (at N. Capitol St.); 38°54′5″N 77°0′36″W | Washington, D.C. | Former parish of the Archdiocese of Washington. It was founded in 1857 and was merged with Holy Redeemer Parish in 2012. |
| St. Gabriel Church | | built 1929; 2015 NRHP-listed | 26 Grant Circle NW; 38°56′37.24″N 77°01′12.31″W | Washington, D.C. | Parish of the Archdiocese of Washington, founded in 1920. Contributing property in the Grant Circle Historic District. |
| Shrine of the Sacred Heart | | 1922 built | 3211 Pine St. NW; 38°55′52.21″N 77°02′8.52″W | Washington, D.C. | Byzantine Style; modeled after the Ravenna Cathedral of Italy |

== Florida ==
| Church | Image | Dates | Location | City, state | Description |
|---|---|---|---|---|---|
| Basilica of St. Paul | | 1927 built | 317 Mullally Street; 29°13′3.07″N 81°01′37.36″W | Daytona Beach, Florida | Spanish mission-style |
| Old St. Anastasia Catholic School | | 1914 built 2000 NRHP-listed | 910 Orange Ave. 27°26′50″N 80°19′58″W | Fort Pierce, Florida | |
| Basilica of St. Mary Star of the Sea | | 1905 built 1971 NRHP-listed | 1010 Windsor Lane; 24°33′11.16″N 81°47′43.67″W | Key West, Florida | Victorian; Contributing property in the Key West Historic District |
| Old Holy Redeemer Church | | built | 120 North Sproule Avenue | Kissimmee, Florida | Late Gothic Revival |
| Cathedral of Saint Mary | | 1957 built | 7525 N. W. 2nd Avenue | Miami | Spanish Colonial Revival |
| Gesu Church | | 1925 built 1974 NRHP-listed | 118 NE 2nd St. 25°46′33″N 80°11′30″W | Miami | Art Deco |
| St. Rita's Colored Catholic Mission | | 1899 built 2007 NRHP-listed | 314 Duss Street | New Smyrna Beach, Florida | St. Rita's Black History Museum |
| Basilica of Mary, Queen of the Universe | | 1979 built | 8300 Vineland Ave. 28°23′5.06″N 81°29′46.01″W | Orlando, Florida | |
| St. James Cathedral | | 1952 built | 215 N. Orange Ave. 28°32′42.53″N 81°22′43″W | Orlando, Florida | Romanesque Revival |
| St. Joseph's Church | | built 1987 NRHP-listed | 1422 Northeast Miller Street | Palm Bay, Florida | Queen Anne Style |
| Cathedral of St. Ignatius Loyola | | 1984 built | 9999 N. Military Trail; 26°49′23.16″N 80°6′24.84″W | Palm Beach Gardens, Florida | Modern |
| Basilica of St. Michael the Archangel | | 1886 built | 19 North Palafox Street | Pensacola, Florida | Gothic Revival |
| Cathedral of the Sacred Heart | | 1967 built | 1212 E. Moreno St. 30°25′53.98″N 87°12′14.63″W | Pensacola, Florida | Modern |
| Sacred Heart Church | | 1906 built 2008 NRHP-listed | 716 North 9th Avenue | Pensacola, Florida | |
| St. Joseph Mission Church | | built 1998 NRHP-listed | 216 8th Street | Port St. Joe, Florida | |
| Cathedral Basilica of St. Augustine | | 1797 built 1970 NRHP-listed | 38 Cathedral Place | St. Augustine, Florida | Spanish Colonial & Renaissance Revival |
| Cathedral of Saint Jude the Apostle | | 1963 built | 5815 Fifth Avenue North; 27°46′39.75″N 82°42′49.18″W | St. Petersburg, Florida | Modern |
| Co-Cathedral of Saint Thomas More | | | 900 W Tennessee St. 30°26′47.22″N 84°17′51.88″W | Tallahassee, Florida | Modern |
| Epiphany Cathedral | | 1980 built | 310 Sarasota St. 27°6′3.6″N 82°26′56.4″W | Venice, Florida | Modern |

== Georgia ==
| Church | Image | Dates | Location | City, state | Description |
|---|---|---|---|---|---|
| Old St. Teresa's Church | | 1859 built 1975 NRHP-listed | 313 Residence Ave; 31°34′59″N 84°9′17″W | Albany, Georgia | The oldest church building in Albany |
| Cathedral of Christ the King | | 1939 built | 2699 Peachtree Road NE; 33°49′41.09″N 84°23′13.02″W | Atlanta | French Neo-Gothic |
| Basilica of the Sacred Heart of Jesus | | 1898 built 1976 NRHP-listed | 353 Peachtree Street, NE; 33°45′49.5″N 84°23′8.5″W | Atlanta | French Romanesque |
| Church of the Most Holy Trinity | | 1857 built 1997 NRHP-listed | 8th & Telfair Streets; 33°28′17.4648″N 81°58′0.444″W | Augusta, Georgia | Early Romanesque Revival, oldest Catholic Church in Georgia |
| Sacred Heart Church | | 1898 built 1972 NRHP-listed | Greene & 13th Streets; 33°28′38″N 81°58′37″W | Augusta, Georgia | Late Victorian, Romanesque; Now a cultural center |
| Church of the Holy Family | | 1877 built 1980 NRHP-listed | 320 12th Street; 32°28′6″N 84°59′18″W | Columbus, Georgia | Gothic Revival |
| St. Joseph's Church | | 1903 built 1971 NRHP-listed | 812 Poplar St. 32°50′12″N 83°38′1″W | Macon, Georgia | Gothic Revival |
| Cathedral Basilica of St. John the Baptist | | 1896 built 1966 NRHP-listed | 222 East Harris St. 32°04′24″N 81°05′29″W | Savannah, Georgia | French Gothic |

== Hawaii ==
| Church | Image | Dates | Location | City, state | Description |
|---|---|---|---|---|---|
| Holy Ghost Church | | built 1894; 1983 NRHP-listed | 4300 Lower Kula Road; 20°45′46″N 156°19′37″W | Kula, Hawaii | Father James Beissel, Octagon mode |
| Cathedral Basilica of Our Lady of Peace | | 1843 built 1972 NRHP-listed | 1184 Bishop St. 21°18′38.7″N 157°51′33.9″W | Honolulu | Romanesque Revival |
| Co-Cathedral of Saint Theresa of the Child Jesus | | 1963 built | 712 N. School St. 21°19′27.26″N 157°51′39.81″W | Honolulu | Modern |
| Holy Trinity Church | | 1958 built | 5919 Kalanianaole Highway; 21°16′59″N 157°43′45″W | Honolulu | St. Philip Neri Chapel |
| St. Benedict's Church | | 1899 built 1979 NRHP-listed | 19°26′21″N 155°53′33″W | Honaunau, Hawaii | |
| Star of the Sea Painted Church | | 1931 built 1997 NRHP-listed | 19°22′34″N 154°58′1″W | Kalapana, Hawaii | Colonial Revival |
| Maria Lanakila Church | | 1928 built 1966 NRHP-listed | 712 Waineʻe St. 20°52′31″N 156°40′36″W | Lahaina, Hawaii | Romanesque Revival |

== Idaho ==
| Church | Image | Dates | Location | City, state | Description |
|---|---|---|---|---|---|
| Cathedral of St. John the Evangelist | | built 1905–1921; 1978 NRHP-listed | 775 N. 8th St. 43°37′17.0616″N 116°11′54.5346″W | Boise, Idaho | Romanesque Revival |
| St. Mary's Church | | 1937 built 1982 NRHP-listed | State & 26th Streets; 43°37′54″N 116°13′15″W | Boise, Idaho | Classical Revival, Neo-Gothic Revival |
| St. Joseph's Church | | built 1982 NRHP-listed | First and Cedar; 46°51′30″N 116°23′46″W | Bovill, Idaho | |
| St. Mary's Church | | built 1937; 1982 NRHP-listed | 616 Dearborn St. 43°39′51″N 116°41′32″W | Caldwell, Idaho | |
| Mission of the Sacred Heart (Cataldo Mission) | | built 1848; 1966 NRHP-listed | Off U.S. Route 10; 47°32′53″N 116°21′25″W | Cataldo, Idaho | Greek Revival |
| St. Thomas Church | | built 1977 NRHP-listed | 919 Indiana Ave. 47°40′34″N 116°46′25″W | Coeur d'Alene, Idaho | |
| St. Joseph's Mission | | built 1874; 1976 NRHP-listed | Nez Perce National Historical Park; 46°18′53″N 116°42′37″W | Culdesac, Idaho | |
| Church of the Sacred Heart | | built 1928; 1980 NRHP-listed | 211 E. 1st St; 43°52′27.87″N 116°29′54.28″W | Emmett, Idaho | |
| Our Lady of Limerick Church | | built 1982 NRHP-listed | 113 W. Arthur Ave. 42°57′00″N 115°17′56″W | Glenns Ferry, Idaho | |
| Holy Rosary Church | | built 1948; 2002 NRHP-listed | 288 E. Ninth St. 43°29′22.5″N 112°01′44.6″W | Idaho Falls, Idaho | Gothic Revival |
| St. Charles Borromeo Church | | 1914 built 1982 NRHP-listed | Pine & South 1st Streets | Hailey, Idaho | Gothic Revival |
| St. Stanislaus Church | | built 1978 NRHP-listed | 633 5th Ave. 46°24′58″N 117°01′22″W | Lewiston, Idaho | |
| Our Lady, Queen of Heaven Church | | 1883 built 1980 NRHP-listed | Oreana Loop Road; 43°02′25″N 116°23′41″W | Oreana, Idaho | |
| Sacred Hearts of Jesus and Mary Church | | 1915 built 1982 NRHP-listed | 608 7th St. 43°47′15″N 116°56′17″W | Parma, Idaho | |
| St. Joseph's Church | | 1897 built 1978 NRHP-listed | 455 N. Hayes | Pocatello, Idaho | Late Gothic Revival |
| St. Agnes Church | | built NRHP-listed | | Weiser, Idaho | |

== Illinois ==
| Church | Image | Dates | Location | City, state | Description |
|---|---|---|---|---|---|
| St. Joseph the Betrothed Church | | built 1977 | 5000 N. Cumberland Ave. 41°58′14″N 87°50′14″W | Chicago | Listed as one of the most unique churches in the world. |
| Holy Cross Catholic Church | | built 1897; 1999 NRHP-listed | 14 N. Van Buren St. 41°51′0.67″N 88°18′9.58″W | Batavia, Illinois | Former church and now the Eastside Community Center. |
| St. Mary's Catholic Church | | built 1911; 1996 NRHP-listed | 308 St. Charles Ave. 40°57′8″N 87°39′9″W | Beaverville, Illinois | Romanesque, Renaissance |
| Cathedral of Saint Peter | | built 1866 | 200 W. Harrison St. 38°30′37″N 89°59′17″W | Belleville, Illinois | Gothic Revival |
| Holy Trinity Catholic Church | | built 1933–1934; 1983 NRHP-listed | 106 W. Chestnut St. 40°29′7.6884″N 88°56′39.0762″W | Bloomington, Illinois | The church, rectory and convent are all part of the listing on the National Register. |
| Church of the Holy Family | | built 1799; 1970 NRHP-listed | East 1st St. 38°33′43″N 90°10′22″W | Cahokia, Illinois | Log building; black walnut timbers |
| Basilica of St. Hyacinth | | 1921 built | 3636 West Wolfram Street | Chicago | Classical Revival |
| Holy Name Cathedral | | built 1874; 2000 NRHP-listed | 735 N. State St. 41°53′46.04″N 87°37′40.13″W | Chicago | Gothic Revival |
| Holy Trinity Church | | 1909 built | 1118 N. Noble Street | Chicago | Polish Cathedral Style |
| Notre Dame de Chicago | | built 1889–1892; 1979 NRHP-listed | 1338 W. Flournoy St. 41°52′24″N 87°39′39″W | Chicago | Romanesque |
| Old St. Patrick's Church | | built 1854; 1977 NRHP-listed | 700 W. Adams St. 41°52′45″N 87°38′40″W | Chicago | Romanesque |
| St. Hedwig's Church | | 1901 built | 2226 N. Hoyne Avenue | Chicago | Renaissance |
| St. John Cantius Church | | 1893 built | 825 N Carpenter St | Chicago | Baroque |
| St. Michael the Archangel Church | | 1909 built | E 83rd Street & South Shore Drive | Chicago | Gothic/Polish Cathedral Style |
| St. Stanislaus Kostka Church | | 1881 built | 1351 W. Evergreen Avenue | Chicago | Polish Cathedral Style |
| St. Thomas Catholic Church | | built 1919; 1978 NRHP-listed | 5472 S. Kimbark Ave. 41°47′44″N 87°35′43″W | Chicago | Church and convent are on the National Register. |
| St. Mary's Catholic Church | | built 1882; 1992 NRHP-listed | 10600 S. Archer Ave. 42°6′22″N 88°22′29″W | Gilberts, Illinois | Stick Style |
| Cathedral of St. Raymond Nonnatus | | built 1955 | 604 N. Raynor Ave. 41°32′6.29″N 88°6′3.6″W | Joliet, Illinois | Neoclassical |
| St. James Catholic Church | | built 1853; 1984 NRHP-listed | 10600 S. Archer Ave. 41°41′55″N 87°55′57″W | Lemont, Illinois | Only country parish in the Archdiocese of Chicago |
| Cathedral of Saint Mary of the Immaculate Conception | | built 1889; NRHP-listed | 607 NE Madison Ave. 40°41′54.9″N 89°35′6.1″W | Peoria, Illinois | The cathedral and the diocesan chancery next door are contributing properties in the North Side Historic District. |
| Cathedral of the Immaculate Conception | | built 1928 | 524 E. Lawrence Avenue; 39°47′36″N 89°38′54″W | Springfield, Illinois | Greek Revival |

== Indiana ==
| Church | Image | Dates | Location | City, state | Description |
|---|---|---|---|---|---|
| St. Benedict Cathedral | | built 1927–1928; 1989 NRHP-listed | 1320 Lincoln Ave. 37°58′12″N 87°32′26.16″W | Evansville, Indiana | The cathedral is a contributing property in the Lincolnshire Historic District. |
| Cathedral of the Immaculate Conception | | built 1859–1860; 1980 NRHP-listed | Jefferson and Calhoun St. 41°4′32.51″N 85°8′16.19″W | Fort Wayne, Indiana | Seat of the Diocese of Fort Wayne-South Bend |
| Cathedral of the Holy Angels | | 1950 built | 640 Tyler Street | Gary, Indiana | Gothic Revival |
| St. John the Evangelist Church | | built 1863–1867; 1980 NRHP-listed | 121 S. Capitol Ave. 39°45′52″N 86°9′41″W | Indianapolis | The first cathedral church in Indianapolis. |
| St. Mary's Church | | built 1910; 1977 NRHP-listed | 317 N. New Jersey St. 39°46′20″N 86°9′0″W | Indianapolis | Late Gothic Revival |
| St. Philip Neri Church | | built 1910; NRHP-listed | 530 and 550 N. Rural St. and 545 N. Eastern Ave. 39°46′32″N 86°07′02″W | Indianapolis | The parish complex forms an historic district on the National Register. |
| Saints Peter and Paul Cathedral | | 1907 built | 1347 N. Meridian Street | Indianapolis | Classical Revival |
| St. Joseph's Church | | built 1867; 1980 NRHP-listed | 1215 N. Newton St. 38°23′44″N 86°55′56″W | Jasper, Indiana | Romanesque |
| Cathedral of Saint Mary of the Immaculate Conception | | built 1866; 2001 NRHP-listed | 1207 Columbia St. 40°25′5″N 86°53′2″W | Lafayette, Indiana | The cathedral is a contributing property in the St. Mary Historic District. |
| St. Patrick's Church | | 1873 built 1999 NRHP-listed | W. Main St. 40°50′11″N 85°43′48″W | Lagro, Indiana | |
| St. Louis Church | | built 1870; 1995 NRHP-listed | 15535 E. Lincoln Highway; 41°3′3″N 84°56′20″W | New Haven, Indiana | The parish complex forms an historic district. |
| St. Casimir Church | | built 1898; NRHP-listed | 1308 W. Dunham St. 41°40′0″N 86°16′8″W | South Bend, Indiana | The parish complex forms an historic district. |
| St. Matthew Cathedral | | built 1960 | 1701 Miami St. 41°39′23.77″N 86°14′7.71″W | South Bend, Indiana | Co-seat of the Diocese of Fort Wayne-South Bend |
| Old Cathedral Basilica of St. Francis Xavier | | built 1826; 1976 NRHP-listed | 205 Church St. 38°40′44″N 87°32′3″W | Vincennes, Indiana | The cathedral complex is listed on the National Register. Seat of the former Diocese of Vincennes, which became the Archdiocese of Indianapolis. |

== Iowa ==
| Church | Image | Dates | Location | City, state | Description |
|---|---|---|---|---|---|
| Church of St. John the Baptist | | 1885 built 1982 NRHP-listed | 712 Division St. 40°48′28″N 91°6′31″W | Burlington, Iowa | Gothic Revival; parish church in the Diocese of Davenport. It is now a part of Divine Mercy Parish, which is a merger of the Burlington area parishes. |
| St. Paul's Church | | 1895 built 1982 NRHP-listed | 508 N. 4th St. 40°48′43.32″N 91°6′10.11″W | Burlington, Iowa | Gothic Revival; parish church in the Diocese of Davenport. It is now a part of Divine Mercy Parish, which is a merger of the Burlington area parishes. It is a contributing property in the Heritage Hill Historic District. |
| St. Patrick's Church | | 1915 built 1992 NRHP-listed | 42°9′34″N 94°33′5″W | near Churdan, Iowa | Romanesque Revival; former parish of the Diocese of Sioux City. Founded in 1872, it was reduced in status to an oratory in 1996. |
| St. Boniface Church | | 1908 built 2012 NRHP-listed | 2500 N. Pershing Blvd. 41°52′27″N 90°10′50″W | Clinton, Iowa | Gothic Revival; former parish of the Diocese of Davenport. Founded in 1861, it merged with the other four Clinton parishes in 1990 to form Jesus Christ, Prince of Peace. The parish continued to use the building until 2007. St. Boniface now houses The Catholic Historical Center at St. Boniface. |
| St. Irenaeus Church | | 1871 built 2010 NRHP-listed | 2811 N. 2nd St. 41°52′42″N 90°10′39″W | Clinton, Iowa | Gothic Revival; former parish of the Diocese of Davenport. Founded in 1848, it merged with the other four Clinton parishes in 1990 to form Jesus Christ, Prince of Peace. The parish continued to use the building until 2008 when they built a new church. St. Irenaeus is now vacant. |
| St. Peter's Church | | 1895 built 1992 NRHP-listed | 1 Bluff St. 41°15′37.0434″N 95°50′51.738″W | Council Bluffs, Iowa | Gothic Revival; parish of the Diocese of Des Moines. It was founded in 1887. |
| St. Patrick's Church | | 1870 built 1978 NRHP-listed | 41°25′37″N 93°47′30″W | Cumming, Iowa | Parish of the Diocese of Des Moines. It was founded in 1852 and was visited by Pope John Paul II in 1979. |
| Sacred Heart Cathedral | | 1889-1891 built 1984 NRHP-listed | 406 and 422 E. 10th St. 41°31′49″N 90°34′8″W | Davenport, Iowa | Gothic Revival; seat of the Diocese of Davenport, which was created from the Diocese of Dubuque in 1881. The parish was founded in 1856 as St. Margaret's and the name was changed to Sacred Heart when the present cathedral was built. Both the cathedral and the rectory are on the National Register. |
| St. Anthony's Church | | 1850-1853 built 1984 NRHP-listed | 407 and 417 Main St. 41°31′26″N 90°34′31″W | Davenport, Iowa | Greek Revival; parish of the Diocese of Davenport. It was founded in 1837. The NRHP listing includes original church (1838) and the present church (1853). The original church is the oldest church structure in Iowa. |
| St. Joseph's Church | | 1881-1883 built 1983 NRHP-listed | Marquette and 6th Street; 41°31′33″N 90°35′24″W | Davenport, Iowa | Gothic Revival; former parish of the Diocese of Davenport. Founded in 1854 as St. Kunegunda parish it became St. Joseph's when the present church was built. It was technically always a German national parish and was closed in 1999. It is now part of a fundamentalist Christian ministry named One Eighty. |
| St. Mary's Church | | 1867 built 1984 NRHP-listed | 516, 519, 522, and 525 Fillmore St. 41°31′30″N 90°35′39″W | Davenport, Iowa | Romanesque Revival; parish of the Diocese of Davenport. It was founded in 1867. The NRHP listing includes the church, rectory, convent and school. The parish's original school building two blocks north is also listed on the National Register. |
| Basilica of St. John | | 1927 built 1987 NRHP-listed | 1915 University Ave. 41°36′02.2″N 93°38′35.9″W | Des Moines, Iowa | Romanesque Revival; parish of the Diocese of Des Moines. The parish was founded in 1905, and church was designed by Maginnis & Walsh. It was elevated to a Minor Basilica in 1989. |
| St. Ambrose Cathedral | | 1891 built 1979 NRHP-listed | 607 High St. 41°35′19″N 93°37′32″W | Des Moines, Iowa | Romanesque Revival; seat of the Diocese of Des Moines, which was created from the Diocese of Davenport in 1911. The parish was founded in 1856 as Des Moines' first parish. |
| St. Anthony's Church | | built 2021 NRHP-listed | 15 Indianola Rd. 41°34′20.8″N 93°37′02″W | Des Moines, Iowa | Romanesque Revival; parish of the Diocese of Des Moines.. |
| St. Augustin Church | | 1924 built 2013 NRHP-listed | 545 42nd St. 41°35′06.6″N 93°40′25.2″W | Des Moines, Iowa | Gothic Revival; parish of the Diocese of Des Moines. The parish was founded in 1920, and church was designed by Maginnis & Walsh. It is a contributing property in the Greenwood Park Plats Historic District. |
| Holy Ghost Church | | 1888 built 2011 NRHP-listed | 2921 Central Ave. 42°31′28.182″N 90°40′49.058″W | Dubuque, Iowa | Romanesque Revival; parish of the Archdiocese of Dubuque. It was founded in 1896 and the parish buildings form a historic district on the National Register. |
| St. Mary's Church | | 1864-1867 built 2015 NRHP-listed | 105 E. 15th St. 42°30′29″N 90°40′01″W | Dubuque, Iowa | Gothic Revival; former parish of the Archdiocese of Dubuque. It was founded in 1849 and closed in 2010. The parish buildings form a historic district. |
| St. Patrick's Church | | 1877-1878 built 1986 NRHP-listed | 110 W. 15th St. 42°30′23.37″N 90°40′9.04″W | Dubuque, Iowa | Gothic Revival; parish of the Archdiocese of Dubuque. It was founded in 1852, and it is a contributing property in the Jackson Park Historic District. |
| St. Raphael's Cathedral | | 1857-1861 built 1985 NRHP-listed | 231 Bluff St. 42°29′41.18″N 90°40′2.52″W | Dubuque, Iowa | Gothic Revival; seat of the Archdiocese of Dubuque, which was established in 1837. Founded in 1833, it is the oldest parish in Iowa. It is a contributing property in the Cathedral Historic District. |
| Basilica of St. Francis Xavier | | 1889 built 1999 NRHP-listed | 114 2nd St. SW; 42°29′3.98″N 91°7′34.49″W | Dyersville, Iowa | Gothic Revival; parish of the Archdiocese of Dubuque. Founded in 1859, it was elevated to a Minor Basilica in 1956. |
| St. Joseph's Church | | 1856 built 1976 NRHP-listed | 330 1st St. NW; 42°51′5″N 91°24′13″W | Elkader, Iowa | Gothic Revival; parish of the Archdiocese of Dubuque. Founded in 1844. |
| Corpus Christi Church | | 1881 built 1976 NRHP-listed | 416 N. 8th St. 42°30′31″N 94°11′20″W | Fort Dodge, Iowa | Romanesque Revival; former parish in the Diocese of Sioux City. Corpus Christi Parish was founded in 1856. The three Fort Dodge parishes merged in 2006 to form Holy Trinity Parish. |
| Sacred Heart Church | | 1922 built 2022 NRHP-listed | 211 S. 13th St. 42°30′13.9″N 94°10′49.5″W | Fort Dodge, Iowa | Romanesque Revival/Prairie School; former parish in the Diocese of Sioux City. Sacred Heart Parish was founded in 1897. The three Fort Dodge parishes merged in 2006 to form Holy Trinity Parish. |
| St. Joseph's Church | | 1886 built 2014 NRHP-listed | 509 Avenue F 40°37′54.03″N 91°18′24.2″W | Fort Madison, Iowa | Gothic Revival; former parish church in the Diocese of Davenport. It is now a wedding chapel. It is a contributing property in the Park-to-Park Residential Historic District. |
| St. Mary of the Assumption Church | | 1871 built 1980 NRHP-listed | 1031 Ave. E. 40°38′0″N 91°19′0″W | Fort Madison, Iowa | Gothic Revival; parish church in the Diocese of Davenport. It is now a part of Holy Family Parish, which is a merger of all three Fort Madison parishes. |
| St. Patrick's Church | | 1854 built 1992 NRHP-listed | W. Bellevue-Cascade Rd. 42°17′7″N 90°50′50″W | Garryowen, Jackson County, Iowa | Gothic Revival; parish of the Archdiocese of Dubuque. It was founded in 1840. |
| St. Patrick's Church | | 1865 built 1992 NRHP-listed | US Highway 34; 41°0′48″N 92°57′20″W | Georgetown, Monroe County, Iowa | Gothic Revival; parish in the Diocese of Davenport. It was founded in 1851 as St. Gregory's, but the name was changed when the present church was built. |
| St. Mary's Church | | 1904 built 2004 NRHP-listed | 520 S Second St. 42°46′52.8816″N 91°5′50.604″W | Guttenberg, Iowa | Gothic Revival; parish of the Archdiocese of Dubuque. It was founded in 1851. The parish buildings form a historic district. |
| Saints Peter and Paul Church | | 1898 built 1986 NRHP-listed | 41°18′19″N 92°0′20″W | near Harper, Iowa | Gothic Revival; former parish of the Diocese of Davenport. The parish was merged with St. Elizabeth in Harper and St. Mary's in Keota to form Holy Trinity parish in 1992. In 2006 the last Mass was celebrated in the church and in 2009 it was sold to the Sts. Peter and Paul Heritage Association. |
| St. Michael's Church | | 1867 built 1983 NRHP-listed | County Road F 52; 41°35′24″N 91°54′48″W | Holbrook, Iowa County, Iowa | Romanesque Revival; former parish of the Diocese of Davenport. Founded in 1843, it was closed in the 1990s. The church complex forms a historic district. |
| St. Patrick's Church | | 1915 built 1983 NRHP-listed | 304 3rd St. 40°52′51″N 95°25′32″W | Imogene, Iowa | Gothic Revival; parish of the Diocese of Des Moines. It was founded in 1880. |
| St. Mary's Church | | 1867 built 1980 NRHP-listed | 220 E. Jefferson St. 41°39′46″N 91°31′54″W | Iowa City, Iowa | Romanesque Revival; parish church in the Diocese of Davenport. It was founded in 1841. Both the church and rectory are listed on the National Register of Historic Places, as is the original rectory which was moved a couple of blocks away to make room for the present rectory. |
| Church of All Saints | | 1875-1889 built 1983 NRHP-listed | 301 S. 9th St. 40°23′50″N 91°23′25″W | Keokuk, Iowa | Gothic Revival; parish of the Diocese of Davenport. Built at St. Peter's, which was founded in 1855, it was renamed when the three Keokuk parishes were merged in the 1980s. |
| St. Joseph's Church | | 1876 built 1995 NRHP-listed | 41°12′12″N 93°18′29″W | near Lacona, Iowa | Romanesque Revival; former parish of the Diocese of Davenport. It was founded in 1853 and was closed in the 1990s. The church and cemetery forms a historic district. |
| St. Boniface Church | | 1887 built 1999 NRHP-listed | 7401 Columbus St. 42°33′3″N 91°6′54″W | New Vienna, Iowa | Parish of the Archdiocese of Dubuque. Founded in 1846. |
| St. Mary's Church | | 1920 built 2022 NRHP-listed | 314 Grand Ave. 41°28′41″N 91°18′32″W | Nichols, Iowa | Gothic Revival; parish of the Diocese of Davenport. Founded in 1874. |
| St. Lawrence Church | | 1883 built 1992 NRHP-listed | W. Bellevue-Cascade Rd. 42°14′26″N 90°41′42″W | Otter Creek, Jackson County, Iowa | Gothic Revival; parish of the Archdiocese of Dubuque. It was founded in 1854. |
| St. Mary of the Visitation Church | | 1930 built | 103 E. 4th St. 41°1′10″N 92°24′38″W | Ottumwa, Iowa | Gothic Revival; parish church in the Diocese of Davenport. It was founded in 1849. Both the church and rectory are eligible to be listed on the National Register of Historic Places. |
| St. Patrick's Church | | 1902 built 2011 NRHP-listed | 1312 Third St. 41°50′27″N 94°6′12″W | Perry, Iowa | Gothic Revival; parish of the Diocese of Des Moines. It was founded in 1881. Both the church and rectory are listed on the National Register of Historic Places. |
| Saints Peter and Paul Church | | 1906 built 1995 NRHP-listed | Jct. of C64 and X47; 42°33′18″N 91°12′51″W | Petersburg, Iowa | Gothic Revival; parish of the Archdiocese of Dubuque. It was founded in 1867. |
| Saints Peter and Paul Church | | 1882 built 1994 NRHP-listed | 16 2nd Ave., NW; 42°44′5″N 94°40′15″W | Pocahontas, Iowa | Italianate; former parish of the Diocese of Sioux City. Founded in 1882, it was closed in 1983. |
| St. Mary's Church | | 1877 built 1979 NRHP-listed | St. Mary's and Washburn Streets; 41°29′0″N 91°34′54″W | Riverside, Iowa | Gothic Revival; parish church in the Diocese of Davenport. It was founded in 1876. The parish buildings form an historic district. |
| Holy Guardian Angels Church | | 1904 built 2019 NRHP-listed | Jade Ave. and 245th St. 42°0′1.8″N 94°55′2.1″W | Roselle, Iowa | Gothic Revival; former parish of the Diocese of Sioux City founded in 1874. |
| Cathedral of the Epiphany | | 1904 built | 1000 Douglas St. 42°30′3.28″N 96°24′25.13″W | Sioux City, Iowa | Gothic Revival; seat of the Diocese of Sioux City, which was created from the Archdiocese of Dubuque in 1902. The parish was founded as St. Mary's in 1891 and it was changed to Epiphany when the present church was built. |
| St. Boniface Church | | 1911 built 1998 NRHP-listed | 703 W. 5th St. 42°30′4″N 96°25′3″W | Sioux City, Iowa | Romanesque Revival; parish of the Diocese of Sioux City. It was founded by the city's German Catholics in 1885. |
| Saints Peter and Paul Church | | 1916 built 1999 NRHP-listed | 1165 NE. Taft Ave. 41°50′57″N 91°27′49″W | Solon, Iowa | Romanesque Revival; former parish of the Diocese of Davenport. Founded in 1861, it was closed in 1996 when it consolidated with St. Mary's in Solon. It is currently owned by a private foundation that maintains the facility. |
| St. Joseph's Church | | 1913 built 2005 NRHP-listed | 42°6′50″N 91°21′18″W | Stone City, Iowa | Gothic Revival; former parish of the Archdiocese of Dubuque. The church building is now an oratory. |
| All Saints Church | | 1908-1910 built 2000 NRHP-listed | 320 N. Fremont St. 41°30′25″N 94°19′2″W | Stuart, Iowa | Byzantine/Romanesque Revival; former parish church in the Diocese of Des Moines. The structure was destroyed in a fire and rebuilt and completed in 2010. It now serves as a community center and a new church was built for the parish. |
| St. Boniface Church | | 2024 NRHP-listed | 250 4th St. 41°36′45.8″N 93°52′58.1″W | Waukee, Iowa | Parish of the Diocese of Des Moines. The historic Gothic Revival church building is the parish's former worship site. |
| St. Boniface Church | | 1882 built 1991 NRHP-listed | 305 Duren St. 41°43′17″N 95°23′44″W | Westphalia, Iowa | Parish of the Diocese of Des Moines. The parish facilities form a historic district. |

== Kansas ==
| Church | Image | Dates | Location | City, state | Description |
|---|---|---|---|---|---|
| St. Patrick's Church | | 1866 built 1998 NRHP-listed | 39°28′10″N 95°7′17″W | Atchison, Kansas | Gothic Revival, built of native stone |
| St. Bridget Church | | 1908 built 1996 NRHP-listed | 39°57′58″N 96°15′48″W | Axtell, Kansas | Gothic Revival |
| St. John the Baptist Church | | 1900 built 1975 NRHP-listed | 701 E. Court St. 39°27′31″N 96°6′8″W | Beloit, Kansas | Romanesque Revival, Gothic Revival |
| St. Benedict's Church | | 1903 built 1998 NRHP-listed | 39°43′8″N 95°13′52″W | Bendena, Kansas | Late Gothic Revival, Romanesque Revival |
| St. Joseph Church | | 1912 built 2005 NRHP-listed | 105 N. Oak St. 39°19′7″N 99°35′11″W | Damar, Kansas | Romanesque Revival |
| Cathedral of Our Lady of Guadalupe | | 2001 built | 3231 N. 14th St. 37°47′34.8″N 100°2′2.04″W | Dodge City, Kansas | Post-Modern |
| Sacred Heart Cathedral | | 1916 built 1983 NRHP-listed | 903 Central Ave. 37°45′23″N 100°1′0″W | Dodge City, Kansas | Former cathedral now serves as a school chapel Spanish Colonial Revival; Ralph Adams Cram, architect |
| St. Joseph Church | | 1904 built 2008 NRHP-listed | 210 W. 13th St. 38°52′29″N 99°19′55″W | Hays, Kansas | Romanesque Revival; the church and school are listed together on the NRHP |
| St. Teresa's Church | | 1910 built 1994 NRHP-listed | 211 E. 5th Avenue; 38°3′33″N 97°55′38″W | Hutchinson, Kansas | Romanesque Revival |
| Cathedral of Saint Peter | | 1927 built | 409 N. 15th St. 39°6′37.08″N 94°38′42″W | Kansas City, Kansas | Gothic Revival |
| St. John the Divine Church | | 1913 built 2013 NRHP-listed | 2511 Metropolitan Ave. 39°04′23″N 94°39′31″W | Kansas City, Kansas | Late Gothic Revival |
| St. Mary's Church | | 1905 built 2015 NRHP-listed | 14920 SE. 232 Rd. 37°59′07″N 99°38′33″W | Kinsley, Kansas vicinity | Gothic Revival |
| Seven Dolors Catholic Church | | 1920 built 1995 NRHP-listed | Juliette & Pierre Streets; 39°10′39″N 96°33′57″W | Manhattan, Kansas | Romanesque Revival |
| St. Mary's Church | | 1896 built 2001 NRHP-listed | 446 KS 137; 39°40′54″N 95°19′49″W | Purcell, Kansas | Late Gothic Revival |
| St. Mary's Church | | 1893 built 1980 NRHP-listed | 9208 Main St. 39°53′08.4″N 96°05′53.8″W | St. Benedict, Kansas | Gothic Revival |
| St. Mark's Church | | 1906 built 1991 NRHP-listed | 37°44′16″N 97°33′59″W | St. Marks, Kansas | Romanesque Revival |
| Sacred Heart Cathedral | | 1953 built | 118 N. 9th St. 38°50′27.6″N 97°36′43.2″W | Salina, Kansas | Modern; Edward J. Schulte, architect |
| Church of the Assumption | | 1924 built 2008 NRHP-listed | 204 SW 8th St. 39°3′5″N 95°40′35″W | Topeka, Kansas | Renaissance, Mission/Spanish Revival; the church and rectory are listed together on the NRHP |
| Church of the Holy Name | | 1925 built 2012 NRHP-listed | 1110 SW 10th Ave. 39°02′59″N 95°41′25″W | Topeka, Kansas | |
| St. Joseph's Church | | 1913 built 1971 NRHP-listed | 312 NE Freeman Avenue; 39°3′25″N 95°40′29″W | Topeka, Kansas | Sacred Heart-St. Joseph Parish |
| Basilica of St. Fidelis | | 1911 built 1971 NRHP-listed | 900 Cathedral Avenue; 38°51′24″N 99°9′1″W | Victoria, Kansas | Romanesque Revival |
| Cathedral of the Immaculate Conception | | 1912 built | 430 N. Broadway St. 37°41′34.84″N 97°20′7.35″W | Wichita, Kansas | Renaissance Revival; Emmanuel Louis Masqueray, architect |
| Immaculate Heart of Mary Church | | 1911 built 1989 NRHP-listed | SE of Spearville; 37°47′6″N 99°38′28″W | Windthorst, Kansas | Late 19th & 20th Century Revivals |

== Kentucky ==
| Church | Image | Dates | Location | City, state | Description |
|---|---|---|---|---|---|
| St. Thomas Church | | 1816 built 1976 NRHP-listed | 870 Saint Thomas Lane | Bardstown, Kentucky | Greek Revival |
| St. Therese Church | | 1948 built 2012 NRHP-listed | 4375 KY 399; 37°35′42″N 83°46′52″W | Beattyville, Kentucky | |
| St. Joseph Church | | 1870 built 1975 NRHP-listed | 430 Church Street | Bowling Green, Kentucky | High Victorian Gothic |
| St. Joseph Church | | 1864 built 1983 NRHP-listed | 6833 Four Mile Road; 38°59′38″N 84°21′42″W | Camp Springs, Kentucky | |
| Cathedral Basilica of the Assumption | | 1915 built 1973 NRHP-listed | 1130 Madison Avenue | Covington, Kentucky | Late French Gothic Revival |
| Mother of God Church | | 1871 built 1980 NRHP-listed | 119 West 6th Street | Covington, Kentucky | Italian Renaissance Revival |
| St. Jerome's Church | | 1893 built 2014 NRHP-listed | 20 State Route 339 North; 36°47′58″N 88°47′27″W | Fancy Farm, Kentucky | Gothic Revival |
| St. Augustine Church | | 1854 built 1989 NRHP-listed | 1256 St. Anthony Church Road; 37°27′1″N 86°13′57″W | Grayson Springs, Kentucky | Gothic, Greek Revival |
| Cathedral of the Assumption | | 1852 built 1977 NRHP-listed | 443 S. 5th St. 38°15′07″N 85°45′31″W | Louisville, Kentucky | Gothic Revival |
| Christ the King Church | | built 1983 NRHP-listed | 718-724 S. 44th St. 38°14′57″N 85°49′32″W | Louisville, Kentucky | Gothic Revival |
| Holy Cross Church | | built 1983 NRHP-listed | 31st and Broadway; 38°14′58″N 85°48′18″W | Louisville, Kentucky | Gothic Revival |
| St. Anthony's Church | | 1887 built 1982 NRHP-listed | 2222-38 West Market St. 38°15′30″N 85°47′16″W | Louisville, Kentucky | Gothic Revival |
| St. Boniface's Church | | 1899 built 1982 NRHP-listed | 501-531 E. Liberty St. 38°15′5″N 85°44′38″W | Louisville, Kentucky | Gothic Revival |
| St. Elizabeth of Hungary Church | | 1915 built 1982 NRHP-listed | 1024-28 E. Burnett St. 38°13′22″N 85°44′23″W | Louisville, Kentucky | Classical Revival |
| St. Francis of Assisi Church | | 1926 built 1987 NRHP-listed | 1960 Bardstown Rd. 38°13′32″N 85°41′52″W | Louisville, Kentucky | Mission/Spanish Revival |
| St. George's Church | | 1909 built 1982 NRHP-listed | 1809 Standard Ave. 38°13′55″N 85°47′27″W | Louisville, Kentucky | Neo-baroque Renaissance |
| St. James Church | | 1913 built 1982 NRHP-listed | 1826 Edenside Ave. 38°13′57″N 85°42′39″W | Louisville, Kentucky | Byzantine Baroque |
| St. Patrick's Church | | 1853 built 1982 NRHP-listed | 1301-5 West Market St. 38°15′26″N 85°46′19″W | Louisville, Kentucky | Romanesque Revival |
| St. Therese of Lisieux Church | | 1907 built 1975 NRHP-listed | 1010 Schiller Ave. 38°14′8″N 85°43′56″W | Louisville, Kentucky | Spanish Baroque |
| St. Vincent de Paul Church | | 1884 built 1984 NRHP-listed | Oak and Shelby Sts. 38°13′59″N 85°44′27″W | Louisville, Kentucky | Gothic Revival |
| St. Stephen's Cathedral | | 1926 built | 610 Locust Street | Owensboro, Kentucky | Italianate |
| Immaculate Conception Church | | 1860 built 1987 NRHP-listed | 38°50′27″N 84°15′52″W | Peach Grove, Kentucky | |
| St. Dominic's Church | | 1890 built 1989 NRHP-listed | 303 W. Main Street | Springfield, Kentucky | Thompson Romanesque |
| St. Rose Church | | 1852 built 1978 NRHP-listed | | Springfield, Kentucky | Tudor Gothic |
| St. Francis DeSales Church | | 1899 built 1979 NRHP-listed | 116 S. 6th Street | Paducah, Kentucky | Classical Revival |
| St. Theresa Church | | 1855 built 1977 NRHP-listed | | Rhodelia, Kentucky | Gothic |
| St. John the Baptist Church | | 1828 built 1980 NRHP-listed | 1307 Johns Hill Road; 39°00′47″N 84°28′17″W | Wilder, Kentucky | Georgian |

30.5095°N 90.4672°W==Louisiana==

| Church | Image | Dates | Location | City, state | Description |
|---|---|---|---|---|---|
| St. Francis Xavier Cathedral | | 1899 built 1984 NRHP-listed | 626 Fourth St. 31°18′44.3″N 92°26′52.1″W | Alexandria, Louisiana | Late Gothic Revival |
| St. Joseph Cathedral | | 1855 built 1990 NRHP-listed | Main & 4th Streets | Baton Rouge, Louisiana | Gothic Revival |
| Cathedral of St. Francis de Sales | | 1938 built | 500 Goode Street | Houma, Louisiana | Gothic Revival |
| St. Philomene Church | | 1888 built 1983 NRHP-listed | LA 1; 29°50′21″N 90°57′16″W | Labadieville, Louisiana | Gothic Revival |
| St. John's Cathedral | | 1926 built 1979 NRHP-listed | 515 Cathedral Street | Lafayette, Louisiana | Romanesque |
| Cathedral of the Immaculate Conception | | 1913 built 1994 NRHP-listed | 935 Bilbo Street | Lake Charles, Louisiana | Italianate |
| St. Anne Church | | 1909 built 2001 NRHP-listed | 417 St. Joseph St. 29°56′16″N 91°1′35″W | Napoleonville, Louisiana | Romanesque, Colonial Revival |
| Basilica of the Immaculate Conception | | 1857-c. 1900 built 1974 NRHP-listed | 145 Church St. 31°45′40″N 93°05′15″W | Natchitoches, Louisiana | Romanesque Revival |
| St. Alphonsus Church | | 1855 built 1973 NRHP-listed | 2029 Constance Street | New Orleans | Italianate & Renaissance Revival, Late Victorian |
| St. Louis Cathedral-Basilica | | 1794 built | 615 Pere Antoine Alley | New Orleans | The oldest continuously operating cathedral in the US |
| St. Mary's Assumption Church | | 1860 built 1971 NRHP-listed | Constance & Josephine Streets | New Orleans | Baroque Revival |
| St. Patrick's Church | | 1837 built 1974 NRHP-listed | 724 Camp Street | New Orleans | Gothic Revival |
| St. Vincent De Paul Church | | 1866 built 1976 NRHP-listed | 3051 Dauphine | New Orleans | Red brick |
| St. Elizabeth Church | | 1902 built 1983 NRHP-listed | LA 402; 29°59′41″N 91°3′32″W | Paincourtville, Louisiana | Gothic Revival |
| Church of the Assumption of the Blessed Virgin Mary | | 1856 built 1979 NRHP-listed | LA 308; 29°59′24″N 91°1′24″W | Plattenville, Louisiana | Gothic Revival |
| Old St. Gabriel Church | | 1772 built 1972 NRHP-listed | LA 75; 30°15′16″N 91°06′07″W | St. Gabriel, Louisiana | Gothic Revival |
| Holy Trinity Church | | 1896 built 1984 NRHP-listed | 315 Marshall Street | Shreveport, Louisiana | Romanesque Revival |
| Cathedral of St. John Berchmans | | 1928 built | 939 Jordan Street; 32°29′51.54″N 93°45′1.18″W | Shreveport, Louisiana | Gothic Revival |
| St. Joseph Co-Cathedral | | 1923 built 1986 NRHP-listed | 721 Canal Boulevard; 29°47′35″N 90°49′11″W | Thibodaux, Louisiana | Renaissance Revival |
| St. Albert the Great Chapel and Catholic Student Center | | 1961 built | 409 W. Dakota Street; 30°30′34.2″N 90°28′1.92″W | Hammond, Louisiana | Mid-century modern |

== Maine ==
| Church | Image | Dates | Location | City, state | Description |
|---|---|---|---|---|---|
| St. Mary's Church | | 1926 built 1987 NRHP-listed | 39 Western Ave. 44°18′42″N 69°47′3″W | Augusta, Maine | Gothic Revival |
| St. John's Church | | 1855 built 1973 NRHP-listed | York St. 44°48′13″N 68°45′40″W | Bangor, Maine | Gothic Revival |
| Our Lady of Mount Carmel Church | | 1893 built 1973 NRHP-listed | U.S. Route 1; 47°16′45″N 68°6′29″W | Grand Isle, Maine | Former church, now a museum |
| Basilica of Saints Peter and Paul | | 1936 built 1983 NRHP-listed | 27 Bartlett St. 44°5′53.38″N 70°12′44.23″W | Lewiston, Maine | Gothic Revival |
| St. Joseph's Church | | 1865 built 1989 NRHP-listed | 253 Main Street; 44°6′0″N 70°12′58″W | Lewiston, Maine | Gothic Revival |
| St. Joseph's Church | | 1870 built | 178 Elm Street | Biddeford, Maine | Neo-Gothic |
| St. Cyril and St. Methodius Church | | 1926 built 1977 NRHP-listed | Main and High Sts. 43°59′57″N 70°3′31″W | Lisbon Falls, Maine | Gothic Revival |
| St. David Church | | 1911 built 1973 NRHP-listed | East of Madawaska on U.S. Route 1; 47°20′57″N 68°16′39″W | Madawaska, Maine | Chickering & O'Connell-designed in Renaissance, Italian Baroque |
| St. Patrick's Church | | 1807 built 1973 NRHP-listed | Academy Rd. 44°3′25″N 69°32′7″W | Newcastle, Maine | Colonial, Federal |
| St. Denis Church | | 1833 built 1976 NRHP-listed | West of North Whitefield on State Route 218; 44°13′43″N 69°36′52″W | North Whitefield, Maine | |
| St. Anne's Church | | 1668 built 1973 NRHP-listed | On Indian Island off ME 43; 44°56′33″N 68°39′10″W | Old Town, Maine | Gothic Revival |
| Cathedral of the Immaculate Conception | | 1866 built 1985 NRHP-listed | Cumberland Avenue & Congress Streets; 43°39′41″N 70°15′17″W | Portland, Maine | Neo-Gothic |
| St. John Church | | built 2003 NRHP-listed | St. John Rd. 47°12′19″N 68°49′08″W | Saint John Plantation, Maine | |

== Maryland ==
| Church | Image | Dates | Location | City, state | Description |
|---|---|---|---|---|---|
| Basilica of the National Shrine of the Assumption of the Blessed Virgin Mary | | 1806-1821 built 1971 NRHP-listed | 409 Cathedral St. 39°17′39.81″N 76°36′58.18″W | Baltimore | First Roman Catholic cathedral constructed in the United States; named a minor basilica in 1937. Designed by Benjamin Henry Latrobe in the Greek Revival style. |
| Cathedral of Mary Our Queen | | built 1959 | 5200 North Charles Street | Baltimore | The 3rd largest cathedral in the US |
| Holy Cross Church | | 1860 built 2002 NRHP-listed | 106-112 East West St. 39°16′34″N 76°36′40″W | Baltimore | Late Victorian Gothic Revival |
| St. Alphonsus Church | | 1860 built 1973 NRHP-listed | 112-116 W. Saratoga St. 39°17′35″N 76°37′4″W | Baltimore | St. John Neumann and Blessed Francis Xavier Seelos both lived in the rectory. Church, rectory, convent and hall are all included in the National Register listing. |
| St. Elizabeth of Hungary Church | | 1895 built 1994 NRHP-listed | Jct. of E. Baltimore St. and Lakewood Ave. 39°17′33″N 76°34′45″W | Baltimore | Romanesque |
| St. James the Less Church | | 1865-1867 built 1980 NRHP-listed | Aisquith St. at Eager St. 39°18′4″N 76°36′8″W | Baltimore | Gothic & Romanesque |
| St. John the Evangelist Church | | 1855-1856 built 1982 NRHP-listed | 901 E. Eager St. 39°18′5″N 76°36′17″W | Baltimore | Italianate |
| St. Leo's Church | | 1880 built 1983 NRHP-listed | 221 South Exeter Street. 39°17′15″N 76°36′3″W | Baltimore | Italianate, Romanesque, and Classical |
| St. Mary's Seminary Chapel | | 1806-1808 built 1971 NRHP-listed | 600 N. Paca St. 39°17′45″N 76°37′23″W | Baltimore | Gothic Revival |
| St. Michael the Archangel Church | | 1914 built 1989 NRHP-listed | 1900-1920 E. Lombard St. 39°17′35″N 76°37′4″W | Baltimore | Romanesque Revaival. The parish complex is listed on the National Register. |
| St. Peter the Apostle Church | | 1843 built 1976 NRHP-listed | 11 and 13 S. Poppleton St. 39°17′17″N 76°37′56″W | Baltimore | Greek Revival |
| St. Vincent de Paul Church | | 1840 built 1974 NRHP-listed | 120 N. Front St. 39°17′29″N 76°36′24″W | Baltimore | Georgian brick tower, Neo-classical with brick walls |
| St. Francis Xavier Church | | 1766 built 1972 NRHP-listed | S of Compton on MD 243; 38°15′20″N 76°42′1″W | Compton, Maryland | The church and adjacent buildings form an historic district. |
| St. Ignatius Church | | 1789 built 1974 NRHP-listed | 533 E. Jarrettsville Rd. 39°34′25″N 76°21′19″W | Forest Hill, Maryland | Rubble stone; the oldest extant church in the Archdiocese of Baltimore |
| St. Dennis Church | | 1933 built 2023 NRHP-listed | 153 North Main Street (SR 213); Jct. of SR 290, Duck Puddle Rd, and Lambson Forest Rd; 39°34′25″N 76°21′19″W | Galena, Maryland | The church and other parish buildings were listed together on the National Register of Historic Places |
| St. Mary's Church | | 1840 built 1991 NRHP-listed | St. Mary's Church Rd. 38°25′53″N 76°54′23″W | Newport, Maryland | The building on the National Register is the original parish church, which is adjacent to the present church. |
| St. Ignatius Church | | 1890-1891 built 1974 NRHP-listed | 2317 Brinkley Rd. 38°48′16″N 76°58′1″W | Oxon Hill, Maryland | Queen Anne, Shingle Style |
| St. Ignatius Church | | 1741 built 1988 NRHP-listed | Ocean Gateway; 38°27′55″N 77°1′27″W | Port Tobacco, Maryland | St. Thomas Manor, the Jesuit residence, and St. Ignatius Church are both part of the National Register listing. |
| St. Peter's Church | | 1823 built 1980 NRHP-listed | Ocean Gateway; 38°58′41″N 76°8′3″W | Queenstown, Maryland | Victorian Gothic |
| St. Ignatius Church | | 1785 built 1975 NRHP-listed | Villa Rd. 38°9′2″N 76°25′25″W | St. Inigoes, Maryland | Walls with brick laid in Flemish bond |
| St. Francis Xavier Church | | 1792 built 1975 NRHP-listed | Church Road; 39°26′16″N 75°48′12″W | Warwick, Maryland | New building within the old wall |

== Massachusetts ==
| Church | Image | Dates | Location | City, state | Description |
|---|---|---|---|---|---|
| Basilica and Shrine of Our Lady of Perpetual Help | | 1878 built 1989 NRHP-listed | 1545 Tremont Street | Boston | Romanesque & Gothic Revival |
| Cathedral of the Holy Cross | | built 1875; 1973 NRHP-listed | 1400 Washington Street | Boston | Gothic Revival; contributing property in the South End District |
| St. Augustine Chapel | | 1818 built 1987 NRHP-listed | 181 Dorchester Street | Boston | Gothic Revival |
| St. Clement Eucharistic Shrine | | 1935 built | 1105 Boylston Street | Boston | Host to the Oblates of the Virgin Mary |
| St. Stephen's Church | | 1804 built 1975 NRHP-listed | 401 Hanover Street | Boston | Early Republic |
| Church of St. Paul | | 1924 built | 29 Mount Auburn Street | Cambridge, Massachusetts | Italian Renaissance; the home of the Harvard University Catholic Center |
| St. John the Evangelist Church | | 1904 built 1983 NRHP-listed | 2270 Massachusetts Avenue | Cambridge, Massachusetts | Romanesque |
| Former St. Anne's Church | | 1891 built | South Main Street | Fall River, Massachusetts | Romanesque; closed in 2018 |
| Notre Dame Church | | 1912 built 1989 NRHP-listed | Main & Marcy Streets | Southbridge, Massachusetts | Late 19th & 20th Century Revival |
| St. Michael's Cathedral | | 1861 built 1974 NRHP-listed | 254 State St. 42°6′15.1″N 72°35′4.1″W | Springfield, Massachusetts | Italianate, Federal; Patrick Keely, architect |
| Holy Name Church | | 1927 built | 1689 Centre Street | West Roxbury, Massachusetts | Romanesque Revival |
| St. Mary's Church | | 1876 built 1989 NRHP-listed | 159 Washington Street | Winchester, Massachusetts | Gothic Revival |
| Cathedral of St. Paul | | 1874 built 1980 NRHP-listed | 38 Chatham Street | Worcester, Massachusetts | Gothic Revival |
| Holy Name Church | | 1893 built 1988 NRHP-listed | Illinois Street | Worcester, Massachusetts | Gothic Revival |
| St. John's Church | | 1845 built 1980 NRHP-listed | 44 Temple Street | Worcester, Massachusetts | Greek Revival; the oldest church in the city of Worcester |
| St. Peter's Church | | 1884 built 1980 NRHP-listed | 935 Main St. | Worcester, Massachusetts | Gothic Revival |

== Michigan ==
| Church | Image | Dates | Location | City, state | Description |
|---|---|---|---|---|---|
| St. Mary of Good Counsel Church | | 1871 built 1983 NRHP-listed | 305 Division Street; 41°53′41″N 84°02′00″W | Adrian, Michigan | Romanesque Revival |
| Cathedral of the Most Blessed Sacrament | | 1915 built 1982 NRHP-listed | 9844 Woodward Avenue | Detroit | Decorated Gothic Revival |
| Most Holy Redeemer Church | | 1921 built 2002 NRHP-listed | 1721 Junction Avenue | Detroit | Late Victorian, Romanesque |
| Our Lady of the Rosary Church | | 1896 built 1982 NRHP-listed | 5930 Woodward Avenue | Detroit | Romanesque Revival |
| Sacred Heart Church | | 1875 built 1980 NRHP-listed | 1000 Eliot Street | Detroit | Romanesque Revival |
| St. Albertus Church | | 1885 built 1974 NRHP-listed | 4321 St. Aubin Street | Detroit | Gothic, Polish Cathedral Style |
| St. Catherine of Siena Church | | 1929 built 1991 NRHP-listed | 4151 Seminole Street | Detroit | Romanesque Revival |
| St. Charles Borromeo Church | | 1912 built 1989 NRHP-listed | 1515 Baldwin Street | Detroit | Late 19th & 20th Century Revival, Romanesque |
| St. Josaphat's Church | | 1901 built 1985 NRHP-listed | 715 E. Canfield Avenue | Detroit | Romanesque/Gothic Revival |
| St. Joseph Church | | 1873 built 1972 NRHP-listed | 1828 Jay Street | Detroit | Late German-inspired Gothic Revival |
| St. Mary Church | | 1876 built 1982 NRHP-listed | 646 Monroe Street | Detroit | Pisan Romanesque |
| St. Stanislaus Bishop and Martyr Church | | 1900 built 1989 NRHP-listed | 5818 Dubois Street | Detroit | Gothic Revival, Beaux Arts, Renaissance |
| St. Theresa of Avila Church | | 1919 built 1989 NRHP-listed | 8666 Quincy Avenue | Detroit | Late 19th & 20th Century Revival, Romanesque |
| Ste. Anne de Detroit Church | | 1887 built 1976 NRHP-listed | 1000 Sainte Anne Street | Detroit | Classical & Late Gothic Revival |
| Sweetest Heart of Mary Church | | 1893 built 1974 NRHP-listed | 4440 Russell Street | Detroit | Gothic Revival, Polish Cathedral Style |
| Transfiguration Church | | 1949 built 2019 NRHP-listed | 5830 Simon K | Detroit | Italian Renaissance Revival |
| St. Toma Syriac Catholic Cathedral | | 2002 built | 25600 Drake Rd. 42°28′57.5″N 83°23′54.3″W | Farmington Hills, Michigan | Modern; seat of the Syriac Catholic Eparchy of Our Lady of Deliverance in the United States |
| St. Paul Church | | 1895 built 1992 NRHP-listed | 157 Lake Shore Road | Grosse Pointe Farms, Michigan | French Gothic, Neo-Tudor, Colonial Revival |
| St. Mary, Our Lady of Mount Carmel Cathedral | | 1976 built | 606 N. Ohio Ave. 45°2′1″N 84°40′59.99″W | Gaylord, Michigan | Modern; Mother Church of the Diocese of Gaylord |
| St. Joseph's Church | | built 1884; NRHP-listed 1992 | 5899 County Road 669; 44°53′40″N 85°53′0″W | Glen Arbor, Michigan | Late 19th-century vernacular |
| Basilica of St. Adalbert | | 1913 built | 654 Davis Ave. NW; 42°58′30.89″N 85°41′4.65″W | Grand Rapids, Michigan | Romanesque Revival |
| Cathedral of St. Andrew | | 1876 built | 215 Sheldon Blvd. SE; 42°57′28.8″N 85°40′2″W | Grand Rapids, Michigan | Gothic Revival; Mother Church of the Diocese of Grand Rapids |
| Immaculate Conception Church | | 1902 built 1990 NRHP-listed | 500 E. Blaine St. 45°49′59″N 88°3′20″W | Iron Mountain, Michigan | Renaissance Revival |
| Cathedral of St. Augustine | | 1951 built | 542 W. Michigan Ave. 42°17′30″N 85°35′29.2″W | Kalamazoo, Michigan | Gothic Revival; Mother Church of the Diocese of Kalamazoo |
| St. Mary Cathedral | | 1937 built 1990 NRHP-listed | 229 Seymour St. 42°44′8″N 84°33′22″W | Lansing, Michigan | Gothic Revival; Mother Church of the Diocese of Lansing |
| St. Peter Cathedral | | 1938 built 2012 NRHP-listed | 311 W. Baraga Avenue | Marquette, Michigan | Romanesque Revival; Mother Church of the Diocese of Marquette |
| St. John the Baptist Church | | 1922 built 1995 NRHP-listed | 904 11th Ave. 45°6′32″N 87°36′48″W | Menominee, Michigan | Late Gothic Revival |
| St. Michael the Archangel Church | | 1852 founded 1866 built | W. Front Street | Monroe, Michigan | Gothic Revival; second oldest church in Monroe County |
| St. Mary's Church | | 1834 built 1982 NRHP-listed | E. Elm Ave. and N. Monroe St. 41°55′08″N 83°23′48″W | Monroe, Michigan | Romanesque Revival; parish buildings from an historic district |
| St. Vincent de Paul Church | | 1895 built 1985 NRHP-listed | 46408 Woodward Ave. 42°37′56″N 83°17′14″W | Pontiac, Michigan | Gothic Revival |
| National Shrine of the Little Flower Basilica | | 1926 built | 2100 W. 12 Mile Rd. 42°30′15″N 83°10′16″W | Royal Oak, Michigan | Art Deco |
| Cathedral of Mary of the Assumption | | 1903 built 1979 NRHP-listed | 615 Hoyt Ave. 43°25′31.91″N 83°56′12.48″W | Saginaw, Michigan | Gothic Revival; Mother Church of the Diocese of Saginaw |
| Church of Our Saviour, Friend of Children | | 1857 built 1992 NRHP-listed | North Shore Rd., Payment Settlement on Sugar Island; 46°31′45″N 84°9′4″W | Sault Ste. Marie, Michigan | Gothic Revival |
| Holy Name of Mary Pro-Cathedral | | 1881 built 1984 NRHP-listed | 320 E. Portage Ave. 46°29′55″N 84°20′29″W | Sault Ste. Marie, Michigan | Gothic Revival |
| Mother of God Cathedral | | 1980 built | 25585 Berg Rd. 42°28′34.34″N 83°16′47.56″W | Southfield, Michigan | Neo-Byzantine; seat of the Chaldean Catholic Eparchy of Saint Thomas the Apostle of Detroit |

== Minnesota ==
| Church | Image | Dates | Location | City, state | Description |
|---|---|---|---|---|---|
| Church of St. Adrian | | 1900 built 1980 NRHP-listed | Main & Church Streets; 43°37′51″N 95°55′58″W | Adrian, Minnesota | Romanesque |
| St. Augustine's Church | | 1896 built | 405 4th St NW; 43°40′12.2″N 92°58′47.6″W | Austin, Minnesota | Gothic revival |
| Church of St. Francis Xavier | | 1917 built 1985 NRHP-listed | 508 13th Street N. 45°19′6″N 95°35′52″W | Benson, Minnesota | One of west-central Minnesota's most architecturally sophisticated churches, designed in Renaissance Revival style by Emmanuel Louis Masqueray. |
| Church of St. Joseph | | 1908 built 1985 NRHP-listed | 720 N. Main Street; 46°5′12″N 94°52′4″W | Browerville, Minnesota | Baroque Revival church anchoring a Polish American community. |
| Church of St. Hubertus | | 1887 built 1982 NRHP-listed | Great Plains Boulevard & West 78th Street; 44°51′43″N 93°31′51″W | Chanhassen, Minnesota | |
| Sts. Peter and Paul Church | | 1916 built 1980 NRHP-listed | 530 Central Avenue; 47°29′1″N 92°52′43″W | Chisholm, Minnesota | Anchored a Ukrainian American community on the Iron Range. |
| Church of Sts. Joseph and Mary | | 1884 built 1984 NRHP-listed | Mission Road; 46°41′2.57″N 92°38′12.28″W | Cloquet, Minnesota | Native American, Log |
| Cathedral of the Immaculate Conception | | 1990 built | 702 Summit Avenue; 47°46′30″N 96°35′25″W | Crookston, Minnesota | Seat of the Diocese of Crookston. |
| Former Cathedral of the Immaculate Conception | | 1912 built 1998 NRHP-listed | N. Ash St. at 2nd Ave. 47°46′27″N 96°36′15″W | Crookston, Minnesota | Gothic Revival. A local organization has plans to develop the building as an arts and community center |
| Church of St. Bridget | | 1901 built 1985 NRHP-listed | 501 3rd Street South; 45°15′33″N 95°28′8″W | De Graff, Minnesota | Built in the first parish established during Archbishop John Ireland's late-19th-century efforts to resettle Catholics in western Minnesota. |
| Cathedral of Our Lady of the Rosary | | 1957 built | 2801 East 4th Street; 46°48′58″N 92°4′6″W | Duluth, Minnesota | Seat of the Diocese of Duluth. |
| Church of St. Joseph | | 1913 built 2002 NRHP-listed | 7897 Elmer Road; 47°5′1″N 92°46′37″W | Elmer, Minnesota | Built for settlers recruited to farm a railroad company's surplus land once it had been cleared of valuable timber. |
| Church of the Holy Family | | 1909 built 1980 NRHP-listed | 307 Adams Avenue; 47°27′45″N 92°32′18″W | Eveleth, Minnesota | Built to anchor a city's sizeable Slovene American population. |
| Church of the Sacred Heart | | 1905 built 1991 NRHP-listed | 110 3rd Avenue Northeast; 45°39′46″N 94°41′10″W | Freeport, Minnesota | Built for a German American community settled in 1876. |
| Church of St. Peter | | 1915 built 1982 NRHP-listed | 25823 185th Avenue Southwest; 47°47′32″N 96°26′54″W | Gentilly, Minnesota | Neo-Gothic |
| Church of Sts. Peter and Paul | | 1930 built 1982 NRHP-listed | State Street; 45°44′11″N 93°56′43″W | Gilman, Minnesota | Beaux Arts |
| Church of St. Francis Xavier | | 1895 built 1985 NRHP-listed | 13th Street North & Montana Avenue; 47°45′29″N 90°18′43″W | Grand Marais, Minnesota | Now a Cook County Historical Society museum. |
| Church of the Sacred Heart | | 1921 built 1989 NRHP-listed | 9th Street & 4th Avenue; 43°47′41″N 95°19′2″W | Heron Lake, Minnesota | Neo-Baroque, Other |
| Church of St. Thomas | | 1870 built 1991 NRHP-listed | 31624 Scenic Byway Road; 44°35′56″N 93°54′1″W | Jessenland Township, Minnesota | Church complex of Minnesota's very first Irish American farming settlement, established in 1852. |
| St. Mary's Church of the Purification | | 1882 built 1980 NRHP-listed | 15850 Marystown Road; 44°43′13″N 93°32′30″W | Marystown, Minnesota | Representative of the Catholic church properties around which many German American settlements grew in rural Scott County, Minnesota. |
| Church of St. Mary | | 1899 built 1993 NRHP-listed | 203 South 5th Avenue East; 45°40′21″N 94°48′28″W | Melrose, Minnesota | Formerly the Church of St. Boniface. Built for a rural German American congregation. Destroyed by a fire in March 2016. |
| Church of St. Stephen | | 1891 built 1991 NRHP-listed | 2211 Clinton Avenue South; 44°57′38″N 93°16′16″W | Minneapolis | Romanesque |
| Basilica of St. Mary | | 1913 built 1975 NRHP-listed | Hennepin Avenue at 16th Street; 44°58′23″N 93°17′11″W | Minneapolis | Classical Revival |
| Church of St. Wenceslaus | | 1907 built 1982 NRHP-listed | East Main Street; 44°32′39″N 93°34′27″W | New Prague, Minnesota | Georgian, Romanesque |
| Church of St. Mary's | | 1909 built 1979 NRHP-listed | 8433 239th Street East; 44°36′11″N 92°56′8″W | New Trier, Minnesota | Beaux Arts |
| Cathedral of the Holy Trinity | | 1893 built | 605 North State Street; 44°19′5″N 94°28′5″W | New Ulm, Minnesota | Seat of the Diocese of New Ulm. |
| St. Joseph's Church | | 1888 built 1985 NRHP-listed | Main Street; 45°58′48″N 94°6′12″W | Pierz, Minnesota | Gothic Revival |
| Co-Cathedral of St. John the Evangelist | | 1957 built | 11 4th Ave. SW; 44°01′23″N 92°28′07″W | Rochester, Minnesota | Modern |
| Church of the Holy Trinity | | 1869 built 1984 NRHP-listed | 83 Main Street; 44°5′52″N 91°49′8″W | Rollingstone, Minnesota | Gothic Revival church built in 1869 and expanded in 1893 by a Luxembourg American community. |
| Church of the Immaculate Conception | | 1902 built 1982 NRHP-listed | 37186 County Road 9; 45°39′42″N 94°28′30″W | St. Anna, Minnesota | Built to anchor a small Polish American community. |
| St. Mary Help of Christians Church | | 1873 built 1982 NRHP-listed | 24588 County Road 7; 45°28′47″N 94°9′8″W | St. Augusta, Minnesota | Built to anchor a small German American community. |
| Cathedral of Saint Mary | | 1931 built | 25 8th Avenue South; 45°33′32″N 94°9′41″W | St. Cloud, Minnesota | Seat of the Diocese of St. Cloud. |
| Church of St. Joseph | | 1869 built 1982 NRHP-listed | 12 W. Minnesota Street; 45°33′50″N 94°19′6″W | St. Joseph, Minnesota | Built to anchor a German American community. |
| Church of St. Kilian | | 1900 built 1998 NRHP-listed | 14034 Emerald Avenue; 43°47′23″N 95°52′10″W | St. Kilian, Minnesota | Gothic Late Victorian |
| Church of St. Michael | | 1890 built 1979 NRHP-listed | Central Avenue & Main Street; 45°12′39″N 93°39′55″W | St. Michael, Minnesota | Gothic Revival landmark of a German American community. |
| Cathedral of Saint Paul, National Shrine of the Apostle Paul | | 1904 built 1974 NRHP-listed | Summit Avenue at Selby Avenue; 44°56′49″N 93°6′32″W | St. Paul, Minnesota | Monumental Beaux-Arts cathedral—called "one of the nation's grandest religious edifices" in its NRHP nomination—designed by Emmanuel Louis Masqueray. Principally built 1906–1915 but with interiors not completed by successors until 1953. |
| Church of St. Agnes | | 1901 built 1980 NRHP-listed | 548 Lafond Avenue; 44°57′35″N 93°7′24″W | St. Paul, Minnesota | Landmark Baroque Revival church built 1901–12 for an Austro-Hungarian immigrant congregation. |
| Church of St. Bernard | | 1905 built 1983 NRHP-listed | 197 Geranium Avenue; 44°58′33″N 93°6′28″W | St. Paul, Minnesota | Built 1905–14, noted for its innovative Prairie School/Art Nouveau design and early reinforced-concrete construction, and as a masterpiece of architect John Jager (1871–1959). |
| Church of St. Casimir | | 1904 built 1983 NRHP-listed | 937 Jessamine Avenue East; 44°58′30″N 93°3′40″W | St. Paul, Minnesota | Beaux-Arts church built for a Polish immigrant congregation. |
| Church of the Assumption | | 1870 built 1975 NRHP-listed | 51 9th Street West; 44°56′51″N 93°5′57″W | St. Paul, Minnesota | Romanesque Revival church based on the Ludwigskirche in Munich, built 1870–74 for a German immigrant congregation. |
| Church of St. Stephen | | 1890 built 1982 NRHP-listed | 103 Central Avenue South; 45°42′5.5″N 94°16′30″W | St. Stephen, Minnesota | Built to anchor a small Slovene American community. |
| Church of St. John the Baptist | | 1924 built 1980 NRHP-listed | 309 South 3rd Avenue; 47°31′15″N 92°32′9.5″W | Virginia, Minnesota | Served as the center of religious and social life for the city's Polish Americans. |
| Church of the Annunciation | | 1913 built 1982 NRHP-listed | County Highway 46; 44°30′56″N 93°17′13″W | Webster Township, Minnesota | Noted for its unusual American Craftsman design. |
| Church of the Most Holy Trinity | | 1905 built 1997 NRHP-listed | 4938 North Washington Street; 44°30′57″N 93°27′37″W | Wheatland Township, Minnesota | Romanesque Revival church built for a Czech American community. |
| Cathedral of the Sacred Heart | | 1952 built | 360 Main Street; 44°2′54″N 91°38′22″W | Winona, Minnesota | Seat of the Diocese of Winona. |
| Basilica of St. Stanislaus | | 1895 built 1984 NRHP-listed | 601 East 4th Street; 44°2′49″N 91°37′20″W | Winona, Minnesota | Polish Cathedral Style |

== Mississippi ==
| Church | Image | Dates | Location | City, state | Description |
|---|---|---|---|---|---|
| Cathedral of the Nativity of the Blessed Virgin Mary | | 1902 built 1984 NRHP-listed | 870 W. Howard Ave. 30°23′49″N 88°53′28″W | Biloxi, Mississippi | Late Gothic Revival |
| Cathedral of St. Peter the Apostle | | 1900 built | 123 North West St. 32°18′04″N 90°11′03″W | Jackson, Mississippi | Gothic Revival |
| St. Patrick's Church | | 1886 built 1979 NRHP-listed | 2614 Davis St. 32°21′48″N 88°42′17″W | Meridian, Mississippi | Gothic Revival |
| Holy Family Church | | 1886 built 1995 NRHP-listed | Along Aldrich, Old D'Evereux, St. Catherine, Abbott and Byrne Streets; 31°33′34″N 91°23′46″W | Natchez, Mississippi | Greek Revival, Italianate, Queen Anne |
| St. Mary Basilica | | 1843 built 1979 NRHP-listed | 107 S. Union St. 31°33′30.96″N 91°24′4.32″W | Natchez, Mississippi | Gothic Revival |
| Sacred Heart Church | | 1868 built 1987 NRHP-listed | Grand Gulf Military State Park; 32°2′0″N 91°3′11″W | Port Gibson, Mississippi | Historic Carpenter Gothic style church that has been moved to the Grand Gulf Military State Park |

== Missouri ==
| Church | Image | Dates | Location | City, state | Description |
|---|---|---|---|---|---|
| Cathedral of St. Mary of the Annunciation | | 1869 built | 615 William St. 37°18′03″N 89°31′38″W | Cape Girardeau, Missouri | Romanesque Revival |
| St. Paul Church | | 1860 built 1979 NRHP-listed | West of Center off Route EE; 39°30′12″N 91°36′21″W | Center, Missouri | Gothic Revival |
| Saint Louis Abbey | | 1955 built | 500 South Mason Road | Creve Coeur, Missouri | Modern; Benedictine Abbey and school sit on 150 acre campus |
| Assumption of the Blessed Virgin Mary Church | | 1872 built 2014 NRHP-listed | NW. corner of jct. of Cedron Rd. & Zey Ln. 38°46′25″N 92°34′15″W | Jamestown, Missouri | Romanesque Revival; the parish buildings from a historic district |
| Cathedral of Saint Joseph | | 1968 built | 2215 West Main Street | Jefferson City, Missouri | Modern; 25 acre site |
| Cathedral of the Immaculate Conception | | 1883 built 1978 NRHP-listed | 416 W. 12th St. 39°6′3″N 94°35′21″W | Kansas City, Missouri | |
| Holy Rosary Church | | 1903 built 2007 NRHP-listed | 911 Missouri Ave. 39°6′33.17″N 94°34′21.78″W | Kansas City, Missouri | Gothic Revival |
| Sacred Heart Church | | 1896 built 1978 NRHP-listed | 2544 Madison Ave. 39°4′50.28″N 94°35′44.2″W | Kansas City, Missouri | Celtic-Norman |
| St. Peter's Church | | 1862 built 1980 NRHP-listed | Southwest of Rensselaer on Route 2; 39°37′11″N 91°36′14″W | Rensselaer, Missouri | |
| Sacred Heart Church | | 1879 built 1982 NRHP-listed | SR U 38°23′49″N 91°52′53″W | Rich Fountain, Missouri | Romanesque Revival |
| Cathedral of St. Joseph | | 1871 built 2000 NRHP-listed | 519 N. 10th St. 39°46′15″N 94°50′54″W | St. Joseph, Missouri | Romanesque Revival |
| Basilica of St. Louis, King of France | | built 1834; St. Louis Landmark designated | 209 Walnut Street | St. Louis | Greek Revival. The first cathedral west of the Mississippi River |
| Cathedral Basilica of Saint Louis | | built 1914; St. Louis Landmark designated | 4431 Lindell Blvd | St. Louis | Neo-Byzantine |
| Immaculate Conception Church | | 1908 built 2008 NRHP-listed | 3120 Lafayette Ave. 38°37′04″N 90°14′32″W | St. Louis | Gothic Revival |
| St. Francis de Sales Church | | 1908 built 1978 NRHP-listed | 2653 Ohio Avenue | St. Louis | Neo-Gothic; 2nd largest church in the Archdiocese of St. Louis |
| St. Francis Xavier College Church | | 1898 built 1978 NRHP-listed | Lindell and N. Grand Blvds. 38°38′13″N 90°13′59″W | St. Louis | Gothic Revival |
| St. John Nepomuk Church | | 1887 built 1972 NRHP-listed | S. 11th St. & Lafayette Ave. 38°36′44″N 90°12′19″W | St. Louis | Gothic Revival |
| St. Liborius Church | | 1889 built 1979 NRHP-listed | 1835 N. 18th St. 38°38′48″N 90°12′00″W | St. Louis | Gothic Revival |
| St. Stanislaus Kostka Church | | 1880 built 1979 NRHP-listed | 1413 North 20th Street | St. Louis | Polish Cathedral Style |
| Shrine of St. Joseph | | 1846 built 1978 NRHP-listed | 1220 North 11th Street | St. Louis | Miracle of St. Peter Claver |
| Shrine of Our Lady of Sorrows | | 1910 built 1982 NRHP-listed | 197 State Hwy P 38°43′58.2″N 91°33′9.5″W | Starkenburg, Missouri | Romanesque Revival |
| St. Agnes Cathedral | | 1910 built | 533 S. Jefferson Ave. 37°12′15″N 93°17′25″W | Springfield, Missouri | Neoclassical |
| St. Joseph Church | | 1848 built 1972 NRHP-listed | Main St. 38°26′28″N 91°59′45″W | Westphalia, Missouri | Romanesque Revival |

== Montana ==
| Church | Image | Dates | Location | City, state | Description |
|---|---|---|---|---|---|
| St. Patrick's Co-Cathedral | | 1904 built | 215 N. 31st St. 45°46′52.08″N 108°30′41.23″W | Billings, Montana | Gothic Revival |
| St. Wenceslaus Church | | built 2014 NRHP-listed | 7724 Danvers Road; 47°13′27.84″N 109°43′3″W | Danvers, Montana | |
| St. John the Baptist Church | | built 1986 NRHP-listed | Mullan Rd. 47°0′47″N 114°13′40″W | Frenchtown, Montana | |
| Sacred Heart Church | | 1926 built 1988 NRHP-listed | 316 W. Benham; 47°06′28″N 104°42′51″W | Glendive, Montana | Romanesque Revival |
| St. Ann's Cathedral | | 1889 built 1991 NRHP-listed | 715 3rd Avenue North; 47°30′31.3″N 111°17′43.4″W | Great Falls, Montana | Gothic Revival |
| St. Joseph's Church | | 1919 built 1991 NRHP-listed | 710 N. Custer Ave. 45°44′08.9″N 107°36′28.8″W | Hardin, Montana | Gothic Revival |
| Cathedral of Saint Helena | | 1908 built 1980 NRHP-listed | 530 N. Ewing St. 46°35′24.5″N 112°1′57.2″W | Helena, Montana | Late Gothic Revival |
| St. Mary of the Assumption Church | | 1900 built 1980 NRHP-listed | Off Montana Highway 287; 45°21′15″N 112°06′26″W | Laurin, Montana | Gothic Revival |
| St. Leo's Church | | 1916 built 1985 NRHP-listed | 124 W. Broadway; 47°3′58″N 109°25′29″W | Lewistown, Montana | |
| St. Francis Xavier Church | | 1892 built 1982 NRHP-listed | 420 W. Pine St. 46°52′28.21″N 113°59′52.88″W | Missoula, Montana | Romanesque Revival |
| St. Joseph's Church | | 1916 built 1999 NRHP-listed | D'Aste Townsite; 47°23′3″N 114°11′47″W | Moiese, Montana | |
| St. Ignatius Mission | | 1893 built 1973 NRHP-listed | North Ave. 47°18′54″N 114°6′7″W | St. Ignatius, Montana | Gothic Revival |
| St. Mary's Mission | | 1866 built 1970 NRHP-listed | North Ave. 46°30′29″N 114°5′43″W | Stevensville, Montana | |
| St. Joseph's Mission | | 1876 built 1998 NRHP-listed | 3497 Montana Highway 284; 46°24′32″N 111°26′55″W | Townsend, Montana | Now the Canton Church Historic Site |
| St. Peter's Church | | 1895 built 1990 NRHP-listed | W. Orgain Ave; 46°59′14″N 104°11′28″W | Wibaux, Montana | Gothic Revival |

== Nebraska ==
| Church | Image | Dates | Location | City, state | Description |
|---|---|---|---|---|---|
| Our Lady of Mount Carmel Church | | 1883 built 2020 NRHP-listed | 2450 17th Ave. 41°16′45″N 98°44′14″W | Ashton, Nebraska vicinity | Gothic Revival |
| Saints Peter and Paul Church | | 1904 built 2000 NRHP-listed | 106 W. 889th Rd. 42°42′53″N 97°15′03″W | Bow Valley, Nebraska | Romanesque Revival |
| Cathedral of the Risen Christ | | 1965 built | 3500 Sheridan Boulevard; 40°46′48.97″N 96°40′12″W | Lincoln, Nebraska | Modern |
| St. Martin's Church | | 1907 built 1985 NRHP-listed | DeWeese | Spring Ranch Township, Clay County, Nebraska | Late Gothic Revival |
| Cathedral of the Nativity of the Blessed Virgin Mary | | 1928 built 1982 NRHP-listed | 204 Cedar Street | Grand Island, Nebraska | Late Gothic Revival |
| Sacred Heart Church | | 1902 built 1983 NRHP-listed | 2206 Binney Street | Omaha, Nebraska | Neo-Gothic |
| St. Cecilia Cathedral | | 1905 built 1979 NRHP-listed | 701 North 40th Street | Omaha, Nebraska | Spanish Renaissance Revival |
| St. Frances Cabrini Church | | 1908 built 1980 NRHP-listed | 1335 S. 10th St. 41°14′45.26″N 95°55′43.89″W | Omaha, Nebraska | Spanish Renaissance Revival; Thomas Rogers Kimball, architect; listed on the NRHP as St. Philomena's Cathedral and Rectory |
| Immaculate Conception Church | | built 2001 NRHP-listed | 102 E. 9th St. 42°48′33″N 97°14′52″W | St. Helena, Nebraska | Gothic Revival |
| Our Lady of Perpetual Help Church | | built NRHP-listed | Southern side of Road N, northwest of Schuyler; 41°34′50.7″N 97°9′42.3″W | Schuyler, Nebraska | Gothic revival |

== Nevada ==
| Church | Image | Dates | Location | City, state | Description |
|---|---|---|---|---|---|
| St. Augustine's Church | | 1886 built 2003 NRHP-listed | 113 Virginia St. 39°29′35″N 117°4′11″W | Austin, Nevada | Gothic Revival |
| Guardian Angel Cathedral | | 1963 built | 302 Cathedral Way; 36°07′50″N 115°09′49″W | Las Vegas | Modern; mother church of the Diocese of Las Vegas |
| St. Thomas Aquinas Cathedral | | 1908 built 2022 NRHP-listed | 310 W. 2nd St. 39°31′33.92″N 119°49′2.28″W | Reno, Nevada | Greek Revival |
| Immaculate Conception Church | | 1932 built 1992 NRHP-listed | 590 Pyramid Way; 39°32′19″N 119°45′5″W | Sparks, Nevada | One of the first Catholic churches built in Nevada after state became a diocese; brick church designed in Mediterranean Revival style by Nevada architect Frederic DeLongchamps |

== New Hampshire ==
| Church | Image | Dates | Location | City, state | Description |
|---|---|---|---|---|---|
| St. Mary Church (Rollinsford, New Hampshire) | | 1856 established | 411 Church Street | Rollinsford, New Hampshire | Oldest continuously used Catholic Church in the state of NH. |
| St. Anne Church (Berlin, New Hampshire) | | 1900 built 1979 NRHP-listed | 58 Church Street | Berlin, New Hampshire | Late Victorian, Romanesque |
| Cathedral of St. Joseph (Manchester, New Hampshire) | | 1869 built | Pine & Lowell Streets | Manchester, New Hampshire | The mother church of Diocese of Manchester |

== New Jersey ==
| Church | Image | Dates | Location | City, state | Description |
|---|---|---|---|---|---|
| St. Nicholas of Tolentine Church | | 1905 built 2001 NRHP-listed | 1409 Pacific Ave. 39°21′38″N 74°25′41″W | Atlantic City, New Jersey | Romanesque Revival |
| St. Henry's Church | | 1915 built | Avenue C & 28th Street | Bayonne, New Jersey | English Gothic |
| St. Joseph Cathedral | | 1909 built | 317 Ave. E 40°39′51.7″N 74°06′54.2″W | Bayonne, New Jersey | Syriac Catholic; Gothic Revival |
| St. Vincent de Paul Church | | 1930 built 2011 NRHP-listed | Avenue C & 33rd Street | Bayonne, New Jersey | Romanesque Revival |
| Our Lady of Good Counsel | | 1896 built 1990 NRHP-listed | 42 West Main Street | Moorestown, New Jersey | Mid-Gothic Romanesque Revival |
| Cathedral of the Immaculate Conception | | 1864 built 2003 NRHP-listed | 642 Market Street; 39°56′41″N 75°7′8″W | Camden, New Jersey | Gothic Revival |
| St. Joseph Pro-Cathedral | | 1953 built | 2907 Federal Street; 39°56′50.76″N 75°5′2.03″W | Camden, New Jersey | Modern |
| St. Joseph (Polish) Church | | 1914 built 2003 NRHP-listed | 1010 Liberty St. 39°55′49″N 75°6′36″W | Camden, New Jersey | Late 19th And 20th Century Revivals |
| St. Patrick Church | | 1887 | 227 Court Street | Elizabeth, New Jersey | Gothic Revival |
| Co-Cathedral of St. Robert Bellarmine | | 2002 built | 61 Georgia Rd. 40°12′54.5″N 74°17′34.2″W | Freehold Township, New Jersey | Modern Romanesque |
| Church of Our Lady of Grace | | 1876 built 1996 NRHP-listed | 400 Willow Avenue; 40°44′32″N 74°2′3″W | Hoboken, New Jersey | Gothic Revival |
| St. Ann Church | | 1925–1927 built 2015 NRHP-listed | 704 Jefferson Street; 40°44′46″N 74°2′10″W | Hoboken, New Jersey | Italian Renaissance Revival |
| St. Anthony of Padua Church | | 1892 built 2004 NRHP-listed | 457 Monmouth St. 40°43′41″N 74°2′57″W | Jersey City, New Jersey | Gothic Revival |
| St. Francis of Assisi Cathedral | | 1959 built | 151 N. Warren St. 40°32′44.4″N 74°21′48.56″W | Metuchen, New Jersey | Gothic Revival |
| Cathedral Basilica of the Sacred Heart | | 1899-1954 built 1976 NRHP-listed | 89 Ridge Street; 40°45′17.64″N 74°10′42.24″W | Newark, New Jersey | French Gothic |
| Pro-Cathedral of St. Patrick | | 1846 built 1972 NRHP-listed | Washington Street and Central Avenue; 40°44′31″N 74°10′21″W | Newark, New Jersey | Gothic Revival |
| St. Casimir's Church | | 1917 built 1997 NRHP-listed | 164 Nichols St. 40°43′24″N 74°9′32″W | Newark, New Jersey | Renaissance Revival |
| St. Columba's Church | | 1898 built 1972 NRHP-listed | Pennsylvania Avenue and Brunswick Street; 40°43′28″N 74°10′49″W | Newark, New Jersey | French & Italian Renaissance |
| St. John's Church | | 1827 built 1972 NRHP-listed | 22-26 Mulberry St. 40°44′17″N 74°9′58″W | Newark, New Jersey | English Norman Perpendicular |
| St. Joseph's Church | | 1871 built 1980 NRHP-listed | W. Market St. 40°44′35″N 74°11′11″W | Newark, New Jersey | Gothic Revival |
| St. Mary's Abbey Church | | 1856 built 1971 NRHP-listed | Martin Luther King Jr. Blvd and William Street; 40°44′9″N 74°17′13″W | Newark, New Jersey | German Romanesque Revival |
| St. Rocco's Church | | 1900 built 1980 NRHP-listed | 212–216 Hunterdon St. 40°44′15″N 74°11′35″W | Newark, New Jersey | Italian/Mediterranean |
| St. Mary of Mount Virgin Church | | 1928–1929 built 2010 NRHP-listed | 190 Sandford Street; 40°29′2″N 74°26′59″W | New Brunswick, New Jersey | Romanesque Revival |
| Cathedral of St. Michael the Archangel | | 1905 built | 96 First St. 40°51′53.9″N 74°07′2.7″W | Passaic, New Jersey | Byzantine Catholic (Ruthenian); Byzantine Revival |
| Cathedral of St. John the Baptist | | 1865 built 1977 NRHP-listed | Main & Grand Streets | Paterson, New Jersey | Gothic Revival |
| Saint Mary's Church | | 1871 built 1985 NRHP-listed | Liberty & West 6th Streets | Plainfield, New Jersey | High Victorian Gothic |
| Cathedral of St. Mary of the Assumption | | 1959 built | 151 N. Warren St. 40°13′21.6″N 74°45′57.81″W | Trenton, New Jersey | Romanesque Revival |
| Sacred Heart Church | | 1889 built 2002 NRHP-listed | 343 S. Broad St. 40°12′59″N 74°45′40″W | Trenton, New Jersey | Classical/Romanesque Revival |

== New Mexico ==
| Church | Image | Dates | Location | City, state | Description |
|---|---|---|---|---|---|
| San Felipe de Neri Church | | 1793 built 1969 NRHP-listed | 2005 North Plaza NW | Albuquerque, New Mexico | In the shape of a cross |
| Our Lady of Purification Catholic Church | | 1865 built 1985 NRHP-listed | Camino Real and 2nd St. 32°23′14″N 106°48′59″W | Dona Ana, New Mexico | Adobe vernacular |
| Cathedral Basilica of St. Francis of Assisi | | 2001 built | 131 Cathedral Place | Santa Fe, New Mexico | Romanesque Revival |

== New York ==
| Church | Image | Dates | Location | City, state | Description |
|---|---|---|---|---|---|
| Cathedral of the Immaculate Conception | | 1902 built 1976 NRHP-listed | 125 Eagle Street; 42.647499°N 73.75972°W | Albany, New York | Gothic Revival; Seat of the Diocese of Albany |
| St. Mary's Church | | 1867 built 1977 NRHP-listed | 10 Lodge Street; 42.651667°N 73.752778°W | Albany, New York | Romanesque Revival |
| Church of St. Stanislaus | | 1897 built 1999 NRHP-listed | 50 Cornell Street; 42.935390°N 74.183151°W | Amsterdam, New York | Late Gothic Revival |
| St. Bridget's Church | | 1874 built 1992 NRHP-listed | 15 Church Street; 42.900556°N 77.432500°W | Bloomfield, New York | Colonial Revival, Italianate |
| Blessed Trinity Church | | 1906 built 1979 NRHP-listed | 317 LeRoy Avenue; 42.932499°N 78.834167°W | Buffalo, New York | Lombard Romanesque |
| Corpus Christi Church | | 1900 built 2007 NRHP-listed | 199 Clark Street; 42.891389°N 78.836111°W | Buffalo, New York | Romanesque |
| St. Francis Xavier Church | | 1895 built 2009 NRHP-listed | 157 East Street; 42.936074°N 78.900533°W | Buffalo, New York | Romanesque Revival |
| St. Joseph Cathedral | | 1862 built | 50 Franklin Street; 42.882801°N 78.878197°W | Buffalo, New York | Gothic Revival; Seat of the Diocese of Buffalo |
| St. Rose of Lima Church | | 1965 built 2017 NRHP-listed | 500 Parker Avenue; 42.952927°N 78.839310°W | Buffalo, New York | Modern |
| St. Theresa's Church | | 1900 built 2016 NRHP-listed | 1974 Seneca Street; 42.857650°N 78.811861°W | Buffalo, New York | Gothic Revival |
| St. Thomas Aquinas Church | | 1920 built 2017 NRHP-listed | 432 Abbott Road; 42.850556°N 78.815556°W | Buffalo, New York | Romanesque Revival |
| St. Vincent of Paul Church | | 1858 built 1985 NRHP-listed | 139 Kanady Street; 44.124426°N 76.339452°W | Cape Vincent, New York | Gothic Revival |
| Our Lady Help of Christians Chapel | | 1853 built 1978 NRHP-listed | 4125 Union Road; 42.926111°N 78.753889°W | Cheektowaga, New York | Greek Revival |
| Church of St. Dismas, the Good Thief | | 1941 built 1991 NRHP-listed | Clinton Correctional Facility; 44.724743°N 73.721834°W | Dannemora, New York | Neogothic |
| St. Francis de Sales Church | | 1864 built 2015 NRHP-listed | 130 Exchange Street; 42.873265°N 76.979756°W | Geneva, New York | Gothic Revival |
| Our Mother of Sorrows Church | | 1859 built 1989 NRHP-listed | 1785 Latta Road; 43.252663°N 77.658864°W | Greece, New York | Romanesque |
| Our Lady of Victory Basilica | | 1926 built | 767 Ridge Road; 42.825833°N 78.823611°W | Lackawanna, New York | National shrine; a popular pilgrimage in the Diocese of Buffalo |
| St. Francis de Sales Church | | 1895 built 1999 NRHP-listed | Church Street; 42.238889°N 74.361389°W | Lexington, New York | Late Gothic Revival |
| St. Rose Church | | 1873 built 1988 NRHP-listed | Lake Avenue; 42.901667°N 77.611389°W | Lima, New York | Late Victorian, Italianate, Romanesque |
| St. William's Church | | 1890 built 2005 NRHP-listed | Long Point on Raquette Lake; 43.825833°N 74.631944°W | Long Lake, New York | Shingle Style |
| Sacred Heart Church | | 1889 built 2019 NRHP-listed | 1112 South Avenue; 43.105898°N 79.048614°W | Niagara Falls, New York | |
| Ascension Church | | 1894 built 2016 NRHP-listed | 172 Robinson Street; 43.033016°N 78.875375°W | North Tonawanda, New York | Gothic Revival |
| Holy Trinity Church | | 1906 built 2010 NRHP-listed | 1419 Fall Street; 43.086853°N 79.044039°W | Niagara Falls, New York | Romanesque Revival; closed 2008 |
| St. Mary of the Angels Basilica | | 1917 built | 202 S. Union St. 42.075278°N 78.431111°W | Olean, New York | Gothic Revival; decreed a minor basilica in 2017 |
| St. Mary's Cathedral | | 1952 built | 415 Hamilton Street; 44.698815°N 75.485646°W | Ogdensburg, New York | Gothic Revival; seat of the Diocese of Ogdensburg |
| St. John the Baptist Church | | 1874 built 1982 NRHP-listed | 20 Broad Street; 44.695556°N 73.454722°W | Plattsburgh, New York | Colonial Revival, Gothic Revival, Quebecois |
| Holy Rosary Church | | 1916 built 2012 NRHP-listed | 414 Lexington Avenue; 43.179722°N 77.641389°W | Rochester, New York | Spanish eclectic |
| Immaculate Conception Church | | 1864 built 1992 NRHP-listed | 445 Frederick Douglass Street; 43.146703°N 77.616708°W | Rochester, New York | Italianate, Romanesque |
| Our Lady of Victory Church | | 1868 built 1992 NRHP-listed | 210 Pleasant Street; 43.158956°N 77.608929°W | Rochester, New York | Early Romanesue Revival |
| Sacred Heart Cathedral | | 1927 built | 296 Flower City Park; 43.193100°N 77.632896°W | Rochester, New York | Gothic Revival; seat of the Diocese of Rochester |
| St. Joseph's Church | | 1846 built 1975 NRHP-listed | 108 Franklin Street; 43.159444°N 77.606667°W | Rochester, New York | Greek Revival, Italianate |
| St. Mary's Church | | 1855 built 1992 NRHP-listed | 15 St. Mary's Place; 43.153276°N 77.606021°W | Rochester, New York | Mid 19th Century Revival |
| St. Agnes Cathedral | | 1935 built | 29 Quealy Place; 40.659806°N 73.646289°W | Rockville Centre, New York | Gothic Revival; seat of the Diocese of Rockville Centre |
| St. Mary's Church | | 1892 built 2017 NRHP-listed | 820 Eastern Avenue; 42.811457°N 73.927892°W | Schenectady, New York | Gothic Revival |
| Basilica of the Sacred Hearts of Jesus and Mary | | 1908 built | 168 Hill Street; 40.883854°N 72.398302°W | Southampton, New York | Gothic Revival; decreed a minor basilica in 2011 |
| Basilica of the Sacred Heart of Jesus | | 1892 built | 927 Park Avenue; 43.052006°N 76.179238°W | Syracuse, New York | Gothic Revival; decreed a minor basilica in 1998 |
| Cathedral of the Immaculate Conception | | 1874 built | 240 East Onondaga Street; 43.046819°N 76.149833°W | Syracuse, New York | Gothic Revival; Seat of the Diocese of Syracuse |
| St. Anthony of Padua Church | | built 2019 NRHP-listed | 1515 Midland Avenue; 43.023945°N 76.150398°W | Syracuse, New York | Gothic Revival |
| St. Patrick's Church | | 1872 built 2012 NRHP-listed | 216 North Lowell Avenue; 43.050183°N 76.183244°W | Syracuse, New York | Gothic Revival |
| Christ Sun of Justice Church | | 1968 built 2011 NRHP-listed | 2215 Burdett Avenue; 42.731801°N 73.672287°W | Troy, New York | Modern |
| St. Joseph's Church | | 1871 built 1977 NRHP-listed | 702 Columbia Street; 43.104976°N 75.241489°W | Utica, New York | German Romanesque |
| St. Nicholas Ukrainian Catholic Church | | 1908 built 2004 NRHP-listed | 2410 4th Avenue; 42.734402°N 73.702966°W | Watervliet, New York | Romanesque |

== New York City ==
| Church | Image | Dates | Location | City, state | Description |
|---|---|---|---|---|---|
| Church of St. Anselm | | 1918 built 2014 NRHP-listed | 683 Tinton Avenue; 40.816111°N 73.905556°W | Bronx | Byzantine Revival, Romanesque Revival |
| Cathedral Basilica of St. James | | 1903 built | 250 Cathedral Place; 40.697056°N 73.986667°W | Brooklyn | Georgian Revival; Seat of the Diocese of Brooklyn |
| Church of the Holy Innocents | | 1914 built 2005 NRHP-listed | 279 East 17th Street; 40.644167°N 73.962778°W | Brooklyn | Late Gothic Revival |
| Co-Cathedral of St. Joseph | | 1912 built | 856 Pacific Street; 40.680444°N 73.966389°W | Brooklyn | Spanish Colonial; designated the Co-Cathedral of the Diocese of Brooklyn in 2013 |
| Church of All Saints | | 1893 built 2007 NYCL Designated | 47 East 129th Street; 40.808333°N 73.938333°W | Manhattan | Gothic Revival; deconsecrated in 2017 |
| Church of the Holy Rosary | | 1894 built | 444 East 119th Street; 40.797193°N 73.932840°W | Manhattan | Romanesque Revival; deconsecrated in 2017 |
| Church of Notre Dame | | 1909 built 1980 NRHP-listed; 1967 NYCL-designated | 40 Morningside Drive; 40.805115°N 73.960327°W | Manhattan | French Neo-classical |
| Church of Sts. Cyril & Methodius and St. Raphael | | 1903 built | 502 West 41st Street; 40.759009°N 73.996785°W | Manhattan | Gothic Revival church, first built for Irish immigrants, now serving as Croatian national parish for Croatian immigrants. |
| Church of St. Ignatius Loyola | | 1900 built 1980 NRHP-listed; 1969 NYCL-designated | 980 Park Avenue; 40.778889°N 73.958611°W | Manhattan | German Baroque, Classical Revival |
| Church of St. Vincent Ferrer | | 1918 built 1984 NRHP-listed; 1967 NYCL Designated | 869 Lexington Avenue; 40.766239°N 73.964738°W | Manhattan | Late Gothic Revival |
| Church of St. Paul the Apostle | | 1815 built 1980 NRHP-listed; 2013 NYCL-designated | 405 West 59th Street; 40.769722°N 73.985278°W | Manhattan | Late Gothic Revival; mother church of the Paulist Fathers |
| Church of the Transfiguration | | 1815 built 1980 NRHP-listed; 1966 NYCL-designated | 25 Mott Street; 40.714623°N 73.999034°W | Manhattan | Georgian Gothic |
| St. Cecilia's Church | | 1887 built 1984 NRHP-listed; 1976 NYCL-designated | 120 East 106th Street; 40.792222°N 73.947222°W | Manhattan | Romanesque Revival |
| St. James' Church | | 1837 built 1972 NRHP-listed; 1966 NYCL-Designated | 32 James Street; 40.712222°N 73.998611°W | Manhattan | Greek Revival |
| St. Jean Baptiste Church | | 1913 built 1980 NRHP-listed; 1969 NYCL-designated | 1067 Lexington Avenue; 40.772648°N 73.960039°W | Manhattan | Late 19th & early 20th Century Revival |
| St. Patrick's Cathedral | | 1878 built 1976 NRHP-listed; 1966 NYCL-designated | 5th Avenue between 50th & 51st Streets; 40.758611°N 73.976389°W | Manhattan | decorated Neo-Gothic; seat of the Archdiocese of New York |
| Basilica of Saint Patrick's Old Cathedral | | 1815 built 1977 NRHP-listed; 1966 NYCL-designated | 260 Mulberry Street; 40.723583°N 73.995306°W | Manhattan | Gothic Revival; decreed a minor basilica in 2010 |
| St. Peter's Church | | 1840 built 1980 NRHP-listed; 1965 NYCL-designated | 22 Barclay Street; 40.712488°N 74.009501°W | Manhattan | Greek Revival with 6 columns; the oldest catholic parish church in New York State |
| St. Benedict Joseph Labre Church | | 1916 built 2007 NRHP-listed | 9440 118th Street; 40.692806°N 73.828728°W | Queens | Romanesque, Classical Revival |
| St. Matthias Church | | 1926 built 2012 NRHP-listed | 58-15 Catalpa Avenue; 40.702114°N 73.902705°W | Queens | Italian Renaissance Revival |
| St. Monica's Church | | 1856 built 1980 NRHP-listed; 1979 NYCL Designated | 9420 160th Street; 40.701944°N 73.798056°W | Queens | Romanesque |

== North Carolina ==
| Church | Image | Dates | Location | City, state | Description |
|---|---|---|---|---|---|
| Basilica of St. Lawrence | | 1905 built NRHP-listed | 97 Haywood St. 35°35′49.92″N 82°33′22.32″W | Asheville, North Carolina | Spanish Baroque |
| Basilica of Mary Help of Christians (Belmont Abbey) | | 1973 NRHP-listed | 100 Belmont Mt. Holly Rd. 35°15′40.68″N 81°2′37.68″W | Belmont, North Carolina | |
| Cathedral of Saint Patrick | | 1939 built | 1621 Dilworth Road East; 35°12′19.44″N 80°50′44.52″W | Charlotte, North Carolina | Neo-Gothic |
| St. Peter's Catholic Church | | 1892 built | 507 South Tryon Street | Charlotte, North Carolina | Gothic Revival |
| St. Joseph's Church | | 1844 built 1979 NRHP-listed | Off NC 273; 35°20′12″N 81°00′01″W | Mountain Island, North Carolina | |
| St. Paul's Church | | 1841 built 1972 NRHP-listed | 510 Middle Street; 35°6′35″N 77°2′22″W | New Bern, North Carolina | Greek Revival |
| Holy Name of Jesus Cathedral | | 2017 built | 715 Nazareth St. 35°46′37″N 78°40′13″W | Raleigh, North Carolina | Romanesque Revival; Fifth-largest cathedral in the United States |
| Sacred Heart Church | | 1924 built 1978 NRHP-listed | 200 Hillsborough Street; 35°46′51″N 78°38′31″W | Raleigh, North Carolina | Neo-Gothic; Former cathedral of the Diocese of Raleigh |
| Basilica Shrine of St. Mary | | 1911 built | 412 Ann Street; 34°13′55.92″N 77°56′35.88″W | Wilmington, North Carolina | Spanish Baroque |

== North Dakota ==
| Church | Image | Dates | Location | City, state | Description |
|---|---|---|---|---|---|
| Cathedral of the Holy Spirit | | 1945 built 1980 NRHP-listed | 519 Raymond St. 46°48′35.53″N 100°47′45.6″W | Bismarck, North Dakota | Art Deco |
| Cathedral of St. Mary | | 1899 built | 604 Broadway; 46°52′56.64″N 96°47′16.8″W | Fargo, North Dakota | Romanesque Revival |
| St. Michael's Church | | 1909 built 1988 NRHP-listed | 520 N. Sixth St. 47°55′36″N 97°2′23″W | Grand Forks, North Dakota | Romanesque Revival |
| St. Mary's Church | | 1885 built 1983 NRHP-listed | Off ND 11; 46°01′41″N 100°01′01″W | Hague, North Dakota | Romanesque Revival |
| Basilica of St. James | | 1914 built 1982 NRHP-listed | 622 First Avenue South; 46°54′10″N 98°42′30″W | Jamestown, North Dakota | Late Gothic Revival |
| St. Mary's Church | | 1884 built 1977 NRHP-listed | 4th Street & 3rd Avenue; 46°54′52″N 103°31′20″W | Medora, North Dakota | Gothic |
| St. Joseph's Chapel | | 1907 built 1994 NRHP-listed | 48°18′35″N 97°8′42″W | Minto, North Dakota | Stick/Eastlake, Colonial Revival, Late Gothic Revival |
| Saints Peter and Paul Church | | 1910 built 1986 NRHP-listed | First Avenue; 46°8′10″N 100°9′42″W | Strasburg, North Dakota | Two buildings |
| St. Stanislaus Church | | 1892 built 1979 NRHP-listed | Off I-29; 48°17′41″N 97°15′11″W | Warsaw, North Dakota | Gothic Revival |
| St. Catherine's Church | | 1936 built 2006 NRHP-listed | 48°16′53″N 98°12′35″W | Whitman, North Dakota | Late Gothic Revival |

== Ohio ==
| Church | Image | Dates | Location | City, state | Description |
|---|---|---|---|---|---|
| St. Bernard's Church | | 1905 built 1989 NRHP-listed | 44 University Avenue | Akron, Ohio | German Romanesque |
| St. Bernard's Church | | built NRHP-listed | Main St.40°30′32″N 84°47′7″Win | Burkettsville, Ohio | |
| Basilica of Saint John the Baptist | | 1871 built 1975 NRHP-listed | 627 McKinley Ave. NW; 40°48′11.88″N 81°22′37.92″W | Canton, Ohio | Gothic Revival; James Renwick Jr., architect |
| St. Aloysius Church | | 1875 built 1979 NRHP-listed | Junction of U.S. Route 127 and State Route 274; 40°26′11″N 84°34′12″W | Carthagena, Ohio | Romanesque Revival; Anton DeCurtins |
| Nativity of the Blessed Virgin Mary Church | | 1858 built 1979 NRHP-listed | State Route 119; 40°24′24″N 84°33′3″W | Cassella, Ohio | Gothic Revival |
| Immaculate Conception Church | | 1903 built 1979 NRHP-listed | Anthony and Walnut Sts. 40°33′7″N 84°34′22″W---> | Celina, Ohio | Romanesque Revival and English Perpendicular: Andrew DeCurtins, architect |
| Cathedral Basilica of Saint Peter in Chains | | 1845 built 1973 NRHP-listed | 325 W. 8th St.39°6′13.89″N 84°31′8.7″W | Cincinnati | Greek Revival; Henry Walter, architect |
| Cathedral of St. John the Evangelist | | built 1852 | 1007 Superior Ave. E41°0′10.21″N 81°41′18.31″W | Cleveland | Gothic Revival; Patrick Kelly, architect |
| Holy Trinity Church | | 1899 built 1979 NRHP-listed | E. Main and 2nd Sts. | Coldwater, Ohio | Renaissance, Gothic |
| St. Joseph Cathedral | | built 1878 | 212 E. Broad St.39°57′46″N 82°59′40.2″W | Columbus, Ohio | Gothic Revival; Michael Harding and Robert T. Brookes, architects |
| St. Francis Church | | built NRHP-listed | Cranberry and Ft. Recovery-Minster Rd.40°23′34″N 84°34′55″W | Granville Township, Ohio | Gothic Revival |
| Holy Cross Church | | 1965 built 1991 NRHP-listed | 1924 Leo St. 39°46′53″N 84°10′4″W | Dayton, Ohio | Lithuanian ethnic |
| Sacred Heart Church | | 1890 built 1987 NRHP-listed | 217 W. 4th St. 39°45′28″N 84°11′43″W | Dayton, Ohio | Romanesque Revival; Charles Insco Williams, architect |
| St. Adalbert Church | | 1904 built 1991 NRHP-listed | 1511 Valley St. 39°47′1″N 84°9′22″W | Dayton, Ohio | Classical Revival, Romanesque |
| St. Joseph Church | | built in 1906 | 411 E 2nd St. 39°45′44.99″N 84°11′5.29″W | Dayton, Ohio | Italianate |
| St. Mary's Catholic Church | | built in 1906; 1983 NRHP-listed | 543 Xenia Ave. 39°45′11″N 84°10′5″W | Dayton, Ohio | Romanesque Revival |
| St. Joseph's Church | | 1887 built 1979 NRHP-listed | Junction of State Route 364 and Minster-Egypt Rd. 40°23′5″N 84°26′4″W | Egypt, Ohio | Late Gothic Revival, Sears |
| Holy Family Church | | 1866 built 1979 NRHP-listed | Ohio State Route 185; 40°14′46″N 84°31′25″W | Frenchtown, Ohio | Gothic Revival |
| St. Patrick's Church | | 1883 built 1979 NRHP-listed | 6 miles northeast of St. Marys on Glynwood Rd. 40°34′59″N 84°19′5″W | Glynnwood, Ohio | Gothic Revival |
| St. John the Evangelist Church | | 1897 built 1997 NRHP-listed | 351 N. Market St. 39°32′35″N 82°24′33″W | Logan, Ohio | Late Gothic Revival |
| St. John the Baptist Church | | 1889 built 1979 NRHP-listed | St. John's Rd. and State Route 11940°24′29″N 84°28′22″W | Maria Stein, Ohio | Gothic Revival; J.A. Decurtins and Adolphus Druiding, architects |
| Basilica of St. Mary of the Assumption | | 1909 built | 506 4th St. 39°25′16.81″N 81°27′20.09″W | Marietta, Ohio | Spanish Colonial Revival; Emile M. Uhlrich, architect |
| St. Rose's Church | | 1892 built 1979 NRHP-listed | Main St.40°24′26″N 84°30′53″W | Marion Township, Ohio | Gothic Revival |
| St. Joseph's Church | | 1892 built 2010 NRHP-listed | 322 3rd St. SE. 40°47′39″N 81°31′3″W | Massillon, Ohio | Gothic Revival |
| Basilica and National Shrine of Our Lady of Lebanon | | 1965 built | 2759 N. Lipkey Rd. 41°07′49.79″N 80°49′17.03″W | North Jackson, Ohio | Maronite Rite |
| St. Anthony's Church | | 1879 built 1979 NRHP-listed | Junction of State Route 49 and St. Anthony Rd.40°30′32″N 84°47′7″W | Padua, Ohio | Romanesque Revival; J.A. De Curtins, architect |
| Cathedral of St. John the Baptist | | 1960 built | 1900 Carlton Rd.41°24′13″N 81°41′35″W | Parma, Ohio | Byzantine Revival; Ruthenian Catholic Eparchy of Parma |
| St. Josaphat Cathedral | | 1985 built | 5720 State Rd.41°24′24″N 81°42′40″W | Parma, Ohio | Byzantine Revival; Ukrainian Catholic Eparchy of Saint Josaphat in Parma |
| St. Mary's Church | | built 1979 NRHP-listed | Philothea Rd.40°27′03″N 84°39′18″W | Philothea, Ohio | |
| St. Joseph's Church | | built NRHP-listed | Sawmill and St. Joe Rds.40°25′41″N 84°44′19″W | Recovery Township, Ohio | Gothic Revival |
| St. Peter's Church | | built NRHP-listed | St. Peter and Philothea Rds.40°27′03″N 84°44′48″W | Recovery Township, Ohio | Gothic Revival |
| St. Wendelin's Church | | built NRHP-listed | Ft. Recovery-Minster Rd.40°23′34″N 84°34′55″W | Recovery Township, Ohio | Gothic Revival |
| St. Henry's Church | | 1897 built 1979 NRHP-listed | Main St.40°23′34″N 84°34′55″W | St. Henry, Ohio | Gothic Revival; J.A. Decurtins, architect |
| Holy Rosary Church | | 1852 founded 1867 built 1979 NRHP-listed | Junction of E. Spring and S. Pine Sts. 40°32′42″N 84°22′58″W | St. Marys, Ohio | |
| St. Sebastian Church | | 1904 built 1979 NRHP-listed | Sebastian Rd. and County Road 716-A40°23′34″N 84°34′55″W | Sebastian, Ohio | Gothic Revival; Andrew De Curtins, architect |
| St. Paul's Church | | built NRHP-listed | Junction of Sharpsburg and Meiring Rds.40°22′02″N 84°42′41″W | Sharpsburg, Ohio | Gothic Revival |
| St. Joseph's Church | | 1843 built 1986 NRHP-listed | | Somerset, Ohio | Gothic Revival |
| Holy Name Cathedral | | built 1890 | 411 S 5th St.40°21′19.8″N 80°37′10.2″W | Steubenville, Ohio | Church was rebuilt in 1957. |
| Our Lady, Queen of the Most Holy Rosary Cathedral | | built 1925–1931 | 2535 Collingwood Blvd.41°40′21″N 83°33′22″W | Toledo, Ohio | Spanish Plateresque style; William Perry, architect |
| Basilica of Our Lady of Mount Carmel | | 1913 built 1979 NRHP-listed | Off OH 289; 41°5′59″N 80°38′31″W | Youngstown, Ohio | Neo-Baroque |
| St. Columba Cathedral | | built 1958 | W. Wood and Elm Sts.41°6′11.52″N 80°39′3.6″W | Youngstown, Ohio | Modern; Diehl and Diehl, architects |

== Oklahoma ==
| Church | Image | Dates | Location | City, state | Description |
|---|---|---|---|---|---|
| Cathedral of Our Lady of Perpetual Help | | 1924 built | 3214 N. Lake Street | Oklahoma City | Italianate |
| St. Joseph Old Cathedral | | 1902 built 1978 NRHP-listed | 224 4th Street W. | Oklahoma City | Neo-Gothic |
| St. Anthony's Church | | 1927 built 1983 NRHP-listed | 515 S. Morton St. 35°37′6″N 95°58′20″W | Okmulgee, Oklahoma | Mission/Spanish Revival |
| Immaculate Conception Church | | 1910 built 1979 NRHP-listed | 1314 Lynn Ave. 36°40′17″N 96°19′53″W | Pawhuska, Oklahoma | Gothic Revival |
| Holy Family Cathedral | | 1926 built 1982 NRHP-listed | W. 8th Street & Boulder Avenue | Tulsa, Oklahoma | Gothic & Classical Revival |
| Sacred Heart Church | | 1912 built 1980 NRHP-listed | 102 Center Point Rd. 34°55′0″N 95°18′44″W | Wilburton, Oklahoma | Neo-Gothic; church and rectory are both listed on the National Register |

== Oregon ==
| Church | Image | Dates | Location | City, state | Description |
|---|---|---|---|---|---|
| St. Francis de Sales Cathedral | | 1908 built 1978 NRHP-listed | 2235 First St. 44°46′46″N 117°49′52″W | Baker City, Oregon | Gothic Revival; Contributing property in the Baker Historic District |
| Our Lady of Perpetual Help Church | | 1897 built 1997 NRHP-listed | 147 North H Street; 43°47′56.7″N 123°3′54″W | Cottage Grove, Oregon | |
| St. Patrick's Church | | built 1874; NRHP-listed 1987 | 330 Monmouth St. 44°51′5″N 123°11′16″W | Independence, Oregon | One of the six buildings in the Historic District listed on the NRHP |
| Our Lady of Perpetual Help Church | | 1897 built 1997 NRHP-listed | 147 North H Street; 43°47′56.7″N 123°3′54″W | Cottage Grove, Oregon | |
| St. Mary's Church | | 1912 built 1976 NRHP-listed | Off OR 214; 45°4′8″N 122°47′49″W | Mount Angel, Oregon | Gothic Revival |
| St. Mary's Cathedral of the Immaculate Conception | | 1925 built 2000 NRHP-listed | 1715 NW Couch St. 45°31′26″N 122°41′20.4″W | Portland, Oregon | Romanesque Revival; Contributing property in the Alphabet Historic District |
| St. Patrick's Church | | 1891 built 1974 NRHP-listed | 1635 NW 19th St. 45°32′05″N 122°41′28″W | Portland, Oregon | Beaux Arts |
| St. Paul's Church | | 1846 built 1979 NRHP-listed | Off OR 219; 45°12′40″N 122°58′42″W | St. Paul, Oregon | Gothic Revival |
| Old St. Peter's Church | | 1897 built 1974 NRHP-listed | 3rd and Lincoln Sts. 45°36′10″N 121°11′15″W | The Dalles, Oregon | Gothic Revival |
| St. John the Evangelist Church | | 1937 built 1979 NRHP-listed | SW of Zigzag on Truman Rd.45°21′8″N 121°57′19″W | Zigzag, Oregon | Rustic |

== Pennsylvania ==
| Church | Image | Dates | Location | City, state | Description |
|---|---|---|---|---|---|
| Cathedral of the Blessed Sacrament | | 1924 built 1992 NRHP-listed | 1 Cathedral Square; 40°30′56.88″N 78°24′14.4″W | Altoona, Pennsylvania | Baroque Revival |
| St. Severin's Church | | 1851 built 1998 NRHP-listed | 24 Maryland Ave. 41°1′54″N 78°6′38″W | Cooper Settlement, Pennsylvania | |
| Basilica of Saints Cyril and Methodius | | 1939 built | 580 Railroad St. 40°57′45.48″N 76°36′10.25″W | Danville, Pennsylvania | Romanesque Revival |
| Blessed Sacrament Cathedral | | 1928 built 1999 NRHP-listed | 300 N. Main St. 40°18′23.48″N 79°32′46.5″W | Greensburg, Pennsylvania | Gothic Revival |
| Cathedral of Saint Patrick | | 1907 built 1976 NRHP-listed | 212 State St. 40°15′49.32″N 76°53′11.04″W | Harrisburg, Pennsylvania | Baroque Revival |
| St. Gabriel's Church | | 1925 built 1992 NRHP-listed | 122-142 S. Wyoming St. 40°56′55″N 75°58′20″W | Hazleton, Pennsylvania | Gothic Revival |
| St. John Gualbert Cathedral | | 1895 built 1992 NRHP-listed | 117 Clinton St. 40°19′30.51″N 78°54′55.16″W | Johnstown, Pennsylvania | Italianate, Romanesque Revival |
| Basilica of St. Michael the Archangel | | 1901 built | 321 St. Mary St. 40°30′9.12″N 78°37′49.08″W | Loretto, Pennsylvania | Romanesque Revival |
| St. Nicholas Croatian Church | | 1922 built 1998 NRHP-listed | 24 Maryland Ave. 40°28′37.36″N 79°58′10.88″W | Millvale, Pennsylvania | Romanesque Revival |
| Mount St. Peter Church | | 1942 built 1980 NRHP-listed | 100 Freeport Road; 40°33′46″N 79°45′42″W | New Kensington, Pennsylvania | Art Deco, International style |
| Ukrainian Cathedral of the Immaculate Conception | | 1966 built | 830 N. Franklin Street | Philadelphia | Byzantine |
| Cathedral Basilica of Saints Peter and Paul | | built 1864, 1971 NRHP-listed (Reference# 71000720) | 18th Street at Logan Circle | Philadelphia | Italian Renaissance |
| Most Precious Blood Church | | 1908-27 built 1992 NRHP-listed | 2800-2818 Diamond St. 39°59′13″N 75°10′49″W | Philadelphia | Mission/Spanish Revival |
| St. Augustine Church | | 1848 built 1976 NRHP-listed | 243 N. Lawrence Street | Philadelphia | Italian Revival, Palladin |
| St. Clement's Church | | 1859 built 1970 NRHP-listed | 2013 Appletree Street | Philadelphia | Romanesque Revival |
| St. Cyprian Church | | 1924 built | 525 South Cobbs Creek Parkway | Philadelphia | Including Rectory and School |
| St. John the Evangelist Church | | 1832 built | 21 South 13th Street | Philadelphia | Gothic Revival; former cathedral of the Diocese of Philadelphia |
| St. Francis de Sales Church | | 1907 built | 4625 Springfield Avenue | Philadelphia | Arts & Crafts movement style |
| Church of the Epiphany | | 1902 built 1998 PHLP-listed | Washington Place & Centre Avenue | Pittsburgh | Red brick Romanesque; with Byzantine details |
| St. Boniface Church | | 1925 built 1974 NRHP-listed | 2208 East Street | Pittsburgh | Romanesque & Byzantine Revival |
| St. Paul Cathedral | | 1906 built 1983 NRHP-listed | 108 N. Dithridge Street | Pittsburgh | Scholastic Gothic |
| St. Stanislaus Kostka Church | | 1892 built 1972 NRHP-listed | 21st & Smallman Streets | Pittsburgh | Romanesque |
| Basilica of the National Shrine of St. Ann | | 1929 built | 1233 St. Ann St. 41°24′8.67″N 75°41′29.43″W | Scranton, Pennsylvania | Romanesque Revival |
| St. Vincent de Paul Church | | 1887 built | Church Street | Plymouth, Pennsylvania | Gothic; Italian Renaissance interior |
| St. Peter's Cathedral | | 1867 built 1976 NRHP-listed | 315 Wyoming Ave. 41°24′38″N 75°39′50″W | Scranton, Pennsylvania | Romanesque Revival |

== Rhode Island ==
| Church | Image | Dates | Location | City, state | Description |
|---|---|---|---|---|---|
| St. Matthew's Church | | 1929 built, 1979 NRPH-listed | Dexter & W. Hunt Sts. 41°53′21″N 71°24′7″W | Central Falls, Rhode Island | Gothic Revival |
| St. Mary's Church | | 1845 built, 1978 NRPH-listed | Church St. 41°41′12″N 71°31′8″W | Crompton, Rhode Island | Gothic Revival, Celtic |
| St. Joseph's Church | | 1872 built, 1982 NRPH-listed | 1303-1317 Mendon Rd. 41°56′3″N 71°25′40″W | Cumberland, Rhode Island | Gothic Revival |
| St. Mary's Church | | 1848 built, 2008 NRPH-listed | 14 William St. 41°29′2″N 71°18′45″W | Newport, Rhode Island | Gothic Revival |
| St. John the Baptist Church | | 1925 built, 1983 NRPH-listed | 68 Slater; 41°52′24″N 71°23′52″W | Pawtucket, Rhode Island | Renaissance Revival |
| St. Mary's Church of the Immaculate Conception | | 1828 built, 1983 NRPH-listed | 103 Pine St. 41°52′18″N 71°23′22″W | Pawtucket, Rhode Island | Gothic Revival |
| Cathedral of Saints Peter and Paul | | 1878 built, 1975 NRPH-listed | 30 Fenner St. 41°49′9″N 71°25′1″W | Providence, Rhode Island | Romanesque/Gothic Revival |
| Our Lady of Lourdes Church | | 1905 built, 1990 NRPH-listed | 901-903 Atwells Ave. 41°49′32″N 71°26′52″W | Providence, Rhode Island | Romanesque Revival |
| St. Joseph's Church | | 1851 built, 1974 NRPH-listed | 86 Hope St. 41°49′17″N 71°23′50″W | Providence, Rhode Island | Gothic Revival |
| St. Michael's Church | | 1915 built, 1977 NRPH-listed | 251 Oxford St. 41°48′06″N 71°24′52″W | Providence, Rhode Island | Late Gothic Revival |
| Church of the Precious Blood (L'Eglise du Precieux Sang) | | 1881 built, 1982 NRPH-listed | 94 Carrington Ave. 42°0′6″N 71°30′33″W | Woonsocket, Rhode Island | Gothic Revival |
| St. Ann's Church | | 1913 built 1982 NRHP-listed | 74 Cumberland St. 42°0′27″N 71°30′8″W | Woonsocket, Rhode Island | Renaissance |
| St. Charles Borromeo Church | | 1871 built, 1983 NRPH-listed | N. Main and Daniels Sts. 42°0′29″N 71°30′52″W | Woonsocket, Rhode Island | Gothic Revival |

== South Carolina ==
| Church | Image | Dates | Location | City, state | Description |
|---|---|---|---|---|---|
| St. Mary Help of Christians Church | | 1905 built 1982 NRHP-listed | York Street & Park Avenue | Aiken, South Carolina | Gothic Revival |
| Cathedral of Saint John the Baptist | | 1907 built (spire 2010) | 120 Broad Street | Charleston, South Carolina | Gothic Revival |
| Basilica of St. Peter | | 1908 built 1989 NRHP-listed | 1529 Assembly Street | Columbia, South Carolina | Neo-Gothic |

== South Dakota ==
| Church | Image | Dates | Location | City, state | Description |
|---|---|---|---|---|---|
| St. Lawrence O'Toole Church | | 1879 built 2003 NRHP-listed | 618 Main Street; 44°22′10″N 103°45′58″W | Central City, South Dakota | Former parish church |
| St. Augustine Church | | 1925 built 2009 NRHP-listed | SE Corner of 6th St. and Main St. 43°14′8″N 99°31′1″W | Dallas, South Dakota | Romanesque Revival; former parish church |
| St. John's Church | | 1915 built 2009 NRHP-listed | Section 31 R96W 73N, Dickens Township; 43°04′14″N 99°33′01″W | near Dallas, South Dakota | Carpenter Gothic; former parish church |
| St. Placidus Church | | 1927 built 1999 NRHP-listed | Minnesota Ave. 44°10′49.8″N 99°3′25.6″W | Gann Valley, South Dakota | Known as Duncan Church |
| St. Anthony of Padua Church | | 1921 built 1980 NRHP-listed | SD 20; 45°14′21″N 99°46′34″W | Hoven, South Dakota | Romanesque Revival; originally known as Bernard's Church |
| St. Peter's Church | | 1891 built 1989 NRHP-listed | 400 Main St. 42°36′15″N 96°33′36″W | Jefferson, South Dakota | Romanesque Revival |
| Holy Trinity Church | | 1895 built 1983 NRHP-listed | Off Interstate 90; 43°44′18″N 98°57′28″W | Kimball, South Dakota | Former parish church |
| Holy Rosary Church | | 1898 built 1986 NRHP-listed | Minnesota Ave. 44°53′35″N 96°55′1″W | Kranzburg, South Dakota | Gothic Revival |
| St. Scholastica Church | | 1900 built 1994 NRHP-listed | W side of Fourth St., between Wisconsin and State Sts. 43°53′47″N 98°8′8″W | Letcher, South Dakota | Late Gothic Revival |
| Holy Family Church | | 1921 built 1976 NRHP-listed | Kimball and Davison Sts. 43°42′40″N 98°1′18″W | Mitchell, South Dakota | Gothic Revival |
| St. Martin's Church | | 1885 built 2005 NRHP-listed | Lot Six Block 5; 43°10′55″N 103°13′51″W | Oelrichs, South Dakota | Vernacular; Former parish church |
| St. Ann's Church | | 1884 built 1979 NRHP-listed | County Hwy. 37; 44°8′51″N 97°8′28″W | near Ramona, South Dakota | Gothic Revival; former parish church |
| Cathedral of Our Lady of Perpetual Help | | 1962 built | 606 Cathedral Drive; 44°3′34.85″N 103°13′37.99″W | Rapid City, South Dakota | Modern |
| Church of the Immaculate Conception | | 1911 built 1975 NRHP-listed) | 918 5th Street; 44°4′33″N 103°13′31″W | Rapid City, South Dakota | Romanesque Revival; former cathedral |
| St. Charles Borromeo Church | | 1916 built 1975 NRHP-listed | Rosebud Indian Reservation; 43°08′28″N 100°54′14″W | St. Francis, South Dakota | Romanesque Revival; Mission complex on the Rosebud Indian Reservation |
| St. Mary's Church | | 1898 built 1985 NRHP-listed | Vermont and Idaho Sts. 43°43′36″N 97°23′22″W | Salem, South Dakota | Gothic Revival |
| St. Joseph Cathedral | | 1919 built 1974 NRHP-listed | 521 N. Duluth Avenue; 43°33′10.44″N 96°44′4.2″W | Sioux Falls, South Dakota | Renaissance Revival; 2 spires |
| Old St. Wenceslaus Catholic Parish House | | 1878 built 1988 NRHP-listed | 227 Yankton Street; 42°56′54″N 97°39′26″W | Tabor, South Dakota | Czech folk architecture |
| St. Wenceslaus Catholic Church and Parish House | | c. 1900 built 1994 NRHP-listed | Yankton and Lidice Sts. 42°57′02″N 97°39′28″W | Tabor, South Dakota | Czech folk architecture |
| St. Agnes Church | | 1892 built 1980 NRHP-listed | E of Lesterville; 43°2′20″N 97°25′18″W | Utica, South Dakota | Gothic Revival; former parish church |
| St. Agnes Church | | 1906 built 1995 NRHP-listed | 202 Washington St. 43°04′14″N 99°33′01″W | Vermillion, South Dakota | Gothic Revival; former parish church |
| St. John the Baptist Church | | 1884 built 1980 NRHP-listed | 43064 Lake Port Road; 42°54′52″N 97°34′56″W | Yankton County, South Dakota | Vernacular Gothic |
| St. Mary's Church | | 1910 built 1982 NRHP-listed | U.S. Route 212; 44°53′44″N 98°43′41″W | Zell, South Dakota | Former parish church |

== Tennessee ==
| Church | Image | Dates | Location | City, state | Description |
|---|---|---|---|---|---|
| St. Michael's Church | | 1842 built 1973 NRHP | 3553 S.Carter Rd; 36°29′14″N 86°59′56″W | Cedar Hill, Tennessee | The oldest continuously operating Catholic church in Tennessee. |
| Immaculate Conception Church | | 1880 built 1982 NRHP-listed | 716 Franklin St. 36°31′44″N 87°21′3″W | Clarksville, Tennessee | Gothic Revival |
| Basilica of Sts. Peter and Paul | | 1890 built 1979 NRHP-listed | 214 E. 8th St. 35°2′47″N 85°18′23″W | Chattanooga, Tennessee | Gothic, Tudor Revival architecture (with the latter style perhaps applying to associated buildings in the NRHP listing) |
| Cathedral of the Most Sacred Heart of Jesus | | 2018 built | 711 S. Northshore Dr.35°55′32.9″N 84°0′02.2″W | Knoxville, Tennessee | Renaissance Revival |
| Sacred Heart of Jesus Church | | 1887 built 1984 NRHP | Berger St. 35°14′46″N 87°20′7″W | Lawrenceburg, Tennessee | Gothic Revival |
| Sacred Heart of Jesus Church | | 1911 built 1984 NRHP | Church St. 35°4′36″N 87°26′36″W | Loretto, Tennessee | Romanesque Revival |
| Cathedral of the Immaculate Conception | | 1938 built 1982 NRHP-listed | 1695 Central Avenue35°7′33″N 90°0′19″W | Memphis, Tennessee | Romanesque & Spanish Colonial Revival; Contributing property in the Central Gardens Historic District |
| St. Mary's Church | | 1870 built 1974 NRHP-listed | 155 Market St. 35°7′3″N 89°58′16″W | Memphis, Tennessee | Gothic Revival |
| Cathedral of the Incarnation | | 1914 built | 2015 West End Ave.36°9′2.88″N 86°47′58.56″W | Nashville, Tennessee | Italianate |
| Church of the Assumption | | 1858 built 1977 NRHP | 1227 7th Ave., N.36°10′31″N 86°47′30″W | Nashville, Tennessee | Gothic Revival |
| St. Mary's Church | | 1845 built 1970 NRHP | 330 5th Ave., N. 36°9′57″N 86°46′53″W | Nashville, Tennessee | Greek Revival; former cathedral |
| St. Joseph Church | | 1885 built 1984 NRHP | 304 American Blvd; 35°1′59″N 87°30′11″W | St. Joseph, Tennessee | Gothic Revival; stone covered with stucco |

== Texas ==
| Church | Image | Dates | Location | City, state | Description |
|---|---|---|---|---|---|
| Sacred Heart Church | | built 1992 NRHP-listed | 1633 S. Eighth St. 32°26′27″N 99°44′32″W | Abilene, Texas | |
| St. Mary's Cathedral | | 2010 built | 1200 S. Washington; 35°12′11″N 101°50′58″W | Amarillo, Texas | Modern |
| St. John the Baptist Catholic Church | | 1917 built 1983 NRHP-listed | FM 1383; 29°47′12″N 96°51′30″W | Ammannsville, Texas | Carpenter Gothic |
| Saint Mary's Cathedral | | 1884 built 1973 NRHP-listed | 203 E. 10th Street; 30°16′16″N 97°44′24″W | Austin, Texas | Gothic Revival |
| Saint Anthony Cathedral Basilica | | 1907 built 1978 NRHP-listed | 700 Jefferson Street; 30°04′40.66″N 94°06′3.44″W | Beaumont, Texas | Brick; the seat of the Diocese of Beaumont |
| Immaculate Conception Cathedral | | 1856 built 1980 NRHP-listed | 1218 E. Jefferson Street; 25°54′7″N 97°29′45″W | Brownsville, Texas | Gothic Revival |
| Saint Anthony's Church | | 1927 built 1987 NRHP-listed | 306 S. Parker Street; 30°40′16″N 96°22′32″W | Bryan, Texas | Romanesque Revival |
| Corpus Christi Cathedral | | 1940 built | 505 North Upper Broadway; 27°47′40.03″N 97°23′48.82″W | Corpus Christi, Texas | Spanish Colonial Revival |
| Catedral Santuario de la Virgen de Guadalupe | | 1902 built | 2215 Rose Avenue; 32°48′50″N 96°48′7″W | Dallas | Neo-Gothic; one spire of 68m height |
| Saint Patrick Cathedral | | 1916 built | 1118 N. Mesa Street; 31°45′56.97″N 106°29′34.56″W | El Paso, Texas | Romanesque Revival |
| Our Mother of Mercy Church | | 1929 built 1999 NRHP-listed | 1100 & 1104 Evans Avenue; 32°43′57″N 97°19′5″W | Fort Worth, Texas | Tudor Revival, Queen Anne |
| St. Patrick Cathedral | | 1892 built 1985 NRHP-listed | 1206 Throckmorton Street; 32°44′57.09″N 97°19′46.94″W | Fort Worth, Texas | Gothic Revival |
| St. Mary Cathedral Basilica | | 1847 built 1973 NRHP-listed | 2011 Church Street; 29°18′14.85″N 94°47′25.13″W | Galveston, Texas | Gothic Revival |
| Nativity of Mary, Blessed Virgin Church | | 1906 built 1983 NRHP-listed | FM 2672; 29°43′2″N 96°55′38″W | High Hill, Texas | Gothic Revival |
| All Saints Church | | 1926 built 1983 NRHP-listed | 201 E. 10th St. 29°47′18″N 95°23′46″W | Houston | Romanesque Revival |
| Annunciation Church | | 1869 built 1975 NRHP-listed | 1618 Texas Ave. 29°45′23″N 95°21′25″W | Houston | Romanesque Revival |
| Cathedral of Our Lady of Walsingham | | 1984 built | 7809 Shadyvilla Lane; 29°47′45.6″N 95°28′59.8″W | Houston, Texas | Gothic Revival |
| Co-Cathedral of the Sacred Heart | | 2000 built | 1111 St. Joseph Parkway; 29°44′57.8″N 95°22′6.7″W | Houston, Texas | Post-modern |
| Cathedral of San Agustin | | 1872 built 1973 NRHP-listed | 214 San Bernardo Avenue; 27°30′8.98″N 99°30′18.69″W | Laredo, Texas | Gothic Revival |
| Ascension of Our Lord Church | | 1912 built 1983 NRHP-listed | FM 957; 29°35′3″N 96°59′8″W | Moravia, Texas | Late Gothic Revival |
| Sacred Heart Church | | 1890 built 1979 NRHP-listed | 503 N. Queen Street; 31°45′45″N 95°38′4″W | Palestine, Texas | Gothic |
| Saint Mary's Church of the Assumption | | 1895 built 1983 NRHP-listed | FM 1295; 29°40′11″N 97°4′0″W | Praha, Texas | Gothic Revival |
| Cathedral of the Sacred Heart | | | 19 S. Oakes; 31°27′47.9″N 100°26′07.1″W | San Angelo, Texas | Modern |
| St. Mary's Church | | 1988 NRHP-listed | 7 West Ave. N 31°26′32.7″N 100°26′05.5″W | San Angelo, Texas | Mission Revival |
| Cathedral of San Fernando | | 1750 built 1975 NRHP-listed | 231 W. Commerce St. 29°25′27″N 98°29′39″W | San Antonio | Colonial Gothic |
| Our Lady of Victory Cathedral | | 1958 built | 101 W. Church Street; 28°49′27.6″N 96°59′31″W | Victoria, Texas | Modern |
| Saint Mary's Church | | 1903 built 1986 NRHP-listed | 101 W. Church Street; 28°47′46″N 97°0′26″W | Victoria, Texas | Gothic Revival |
| Old St. Anthony's Church | | 1910 built 1979 NRHP-listed | S. Violet Road & TX 44; 27°46′57″N 97°35′40″W | Violet, Texas | |

== Utah ==
| Church | Image | Dates | Location | City, state | Description |
|---|---|---|---|---|---|
| St. Mary of the Assumption Church | | 1884 built 1979 NRHP-listed | 121 Park Ave. 40°38′24″N 111°29′38″W | Park City, Utah | Gothic Revival |
| Notre Dame de Lourdes Church | | built 1978 NRHP-listed | 200 N. Carbon Ave. 39°36′10″N 110°48′37″W | Price, Utah | |
| Cathedral of the Madeleine | | 1900 built 1971 NRHP-listed | 331 E. South Temple St. 40°46′11″N 111°52′54″W | Salt Lake City, Utah | Romanesque Revival |

== Vermont ==
| Church | Image | Dates | Location | City, state | Description |
|---|---|---|---|---|---|
| Saint Augustine Church | | 1903 built 1978 NRHP-listed | 16 Barre Street; 44°15′29.8″N 72°34′31.6″W | Montpelier, Vermont | Gothic Revival; contributing property in the Montpelier Historic District |
| St. Elizabeth Catholic Church | | 1893 built | 610 Hill Street; 44°31′58.54″N 72°00′01.69″W | Lyndonville, Vermont | |
| St. George's Church | | 1840 built 2001 NRHP-listed | VT 25 | Bakersfield, Vermont | Greek/Gothic Revival |
| Cathedral of the Immaculate Conception | | 1977 built | 20 Pine Street; 44°28′47.05″N 73°12′53.56″W | Burlington, Vermont | Modern; Former Cathedral of the Diocese of Burlington |
| Cathedral of Saint Joseph | | 1887 built | 29 Allen Street; 44°29′1.15″N 73°12′52.71″W | Burlington, Vermont | Neoclassical |
| St. Mary's Church | | 1902-10 built | 326 College Street; 44°00′39.07″N 73°10′30.67″W | Middlebury, Vermont | Romanesque Revival |
| St. Peter's Church | | 1873 built 1980 NRHP-listed | Convent Ave., Meadow and River Sts. 43°36′8.52″N 72°59′8″W | Rutland, Vermont | Gothic Revival |
| St. Thomas Church | | 1891 built | 6 Green St, Underhill Center; 44°30′24.78″N 72°54′02.92″W | Underhill, Vermont | Gothic Revival |
| St. Francis Xavier Church | | 1870 built 1993 State Register-listed | 3 Saint Peter Street; 44°29′47.63″N 73°11′14.05″W | Winooski, Vermont | French Gothic Revival and Romanesque architecture |

== Virginia ==
| Church | Image | Dates | Location | City, state | Description |
|---|---|---|---|---|---|
| Cathedral of Saint Thomas More | | 1961 built | 3901 Cathedral Lane; 38°52′14.4″N 77°6′12.2″W | Arlington County, Virginia | Modern |
| St. Mary's Church | | 1858 built 1976 NRHP-listed | 5605 Vogue Rd. 38°48′8″N 77°19′37″W | Fairfax Station, Virginia | Gothic Revival |
| St. Vincent de Paul Church | | built NRHP-listed | | Newport News, Virginia | |
| Basilica of Saint Mary of the Immaculate Conception | | 1858 built 1979 NRHP-listed | 232 Chapel St. 36°50′49″N 76°16′56″W | Norfolk, Virginia | Late Gothic Revival |
| Saint Mary's Catholic Cemetery | | built NRHP-listed | 3000 Church St. 36°52′28″N 76°16′49″W | Norfolk, Virginia | |
| St. Paul's Church | | 1905 built 2002 NRHP-listed | 518 High St. 36°50′15″N 76°18′13″W | Portsmouth, Virginia | Virginia Landmarks Register-listed |
| Cathedral of the Sacred Heart | | 1906 built 1982 NRHP-listed | 800 South Cathedral Place; 37°32′50.8″N 77°27′7.7″W | Richmond, Virginia | Renaissance Revival |
| Church of the Sacred Heart | | 1901 built 2002 NRHP-listed | 1401 Perry St. 37°31′21″N 77°26′57″W | Richmond, Virginia | Renaissance Revival |
| St. Peter's Church | | 1834 built 1969 NRHP-listed | 800 E. Grace St. 37°32′26″N 77°26′8″W | Richmond, Virginia | Neoclassical |
| St. Andrew's Church | | 1887 built 1973 NRHP-listed | 631 N. Jefferson St. 37°16′41″N 79°56′29″W | Roanoke, Virginia | Gothic Revival |

== Washington ==
| Church | Image | Dates | Location | City, state | Description |
|---|---|---|---|---|---|
| St. Anne's Church | | 1904 built 1976 NRHP-listed | West of Marysville on Mission Beach Rd. 48°03′43″N 122°16′34″W | Marysville, Washington | Gothic Revival |
| Holy Cross Polish National Catholic Church | | 1916 built 1987 NRHP-listed | 3rd & Queen Streets; 46°34′04″N 123°17′57″W | Pe Ell, Washington | Late Gothic Revival |
| Blessed Sacrament Church | | 1984 built | 5050 8th Avenue N.E. 47°40′0″N 122°19′03″W | Seattle | Near University of Washington; Order of Preachers |
| St. James Cathedral | | 1907 built; Seattle Landmark designated 1984 | 804 Ninth Ave. 47°36′27.7″N 122°19′32.9″W | Seattle | Renaissance Revival |
| Cathedral of Our Lady of Lourdes | | 1908 built | 1115 W. Riverside Ave. 47°39′28.6″N 117°25′42.4″W | Spokane, Washington | Romanesque Revival |
| Mary Queen of Heaven Church | | 1902 built 1990 NRHP-listed | North 1st & B Streets; 47°18′09″N 117°58′30″W | Sprague, Washington | Gothic Revival |
| Church of the Immaculate Conception | | 1864 built 1974 NRHP-listed | 1810 Nisqually St. 47°10′16.3″N 122°35′36.9″W | Steilacoom, Washington | First catholic church in Washington |
| St. Boniface Church | | 1905 built 1994 NRHP-listed | 206 St. Boniface St. 46°32′25″N 117°5′27″W | Uniontown, Washington | Romanesque Revival |
| Proto-Cathedral of St. James the Greater | | 1885 built | 218 W 12th St. 45°37′51″N 122°40′23″W | Vancouver, Washington | Gothic Revival |
| St. Paul Cathedral | | 1914 built | 15 S. 12th Ave. 46°35′46″N 120°31′33″W | Yakima, Washington | Spanish Colonial Revival |

== West Virginia ==
| Church | Image | Dates | Location | City, state | Description |
|---|---|---|---|---|---|
| St. Colman's Church | | built 1877; 1984 NRHP-listed | County Routes 20/6 and 17/2; 37°45′57″N 80°55′16″W | Beckley, West Virginia | On Irish Mountain |
| St. Bernard Church | | built 1909; 1985 NRHP-listed | County Routes 20/6 and 17/2; 38°59′35″N 80°35′34″W | Camden, West Virginia | Gothic Revival |
| Basilica of the Co-Cathedral of the Sacred Heart | | built 1897; 2006 NRHP-listed | 1114 Virginia Street, East; 38°20′50.37″N 81°37′58.26″W | Charleston, West Virginia | Romanesque Revival; Contributing property in the Downtown Charleston Historic District |
| Good Shepherd Church | | built 1877; 1990 NRHP-listed | SR 61 SW of East Bank; 38°12′37″N 81°27′22″W | Coalburg, West Virginia | Gothic Revival |
| St. Peter's Church | | built 1833; 1973 NRHP-listed | Church St. and Jefferson Rock Trail; 39°19′28″N 77°43′53″W | Harpers Ferry, West Virginia | Late Gothic Revival |
| St. Francis Xavier Church | | built 1869; 1978 NRHP-listed | 532 Market St. 39°15′57″N 81°33′34″W | Parkersburg, West Virginia | Gothic Revival, Romanesque Revival |
| St. Charles Church | | built 1876; 2024 NRHP-listed | Winchester St. 39°31′57″N 78°27′28″W | Paw Paw, West Virginia | Simple Gothic Revival |
| Cathedral of Saint Joseph | | 1926 built 1999 NRHP-listed | 231 Bluff St. 40°3′59.47″N 80°43′11.82″W | Wheeling, West Virginia | Romanesque Revival; the seat of the Diocese of Wheeling-Charleston |

== Wisconsin ==
| Church | Image | Dates | Location | City, state | Description |
|---|---|---|---|---|---|
| St. Patrick's Church | | built 1877; 1983 NRHP-listed | County Road A 43°37′0″N 87°55′49″W | Adell, Wisconsin | Late Gothic Revival |
| St. Peter's Church | | built 1901; 1980 NRHP-listed | Sherman Ave. roughly between Marston Ave. and N. Brearly St. 43°5′24″N 89°22′27″W | Ashton, Wisconsin | |
| Notre Dame Church | | built 1872; 1983 NRHP-listed | 117 Allen St. 44°56′9″N 91°23′12″W | Chippewa Falls, Wisconsin | Romanesque |
| St. Joseph's Chapel | | built 1896; 1988 NRHP-listed | Sacred Heart Cemetery, Omaha St. 44°49′27″N 91°28′50″W | Eau Claire, Wisconsin | Gothic Revival |
| St. Patrick's Church | | built 1885; 1963 NRHP-listed | 322 Fulton St. 44°48′41″N 91°30′30″W | Eau Claire, Wisconsin | Late Gothic Revival/Romanesque |
| Holy Hill National Shrine of Mary, Help of Christians | | built 1862; 1992 NRHP-listed | 1525 Carmel Rd. 43°14′42″N 88°19′38″W | Erin, Wisconsin | Romanesque Revival |
| Holy Cross Church | | built 1862; 2001 NRHP-listed | 3001 Bay Settlement Rd. 44°33′20″N 87°53′27″W | Green Bay, Wisconsin | Romanesque & Italianate |
| St. Francis Xavier Cathedral | | built 1881 | 140 S. Monroe Ave. 44°30′40.86″N 88°0′41.02″W | Green Bay, Wisconsin | Romanesque Revival |
| St. Mary of the Angels Church | | 2019 NRHP-listed | 645 S. Irwin Ave. 44°30′0.9″N 88°0′08.3″W | Green Bay, Wisconsin | Gothic Revival |
| Historic Saint Ann's Church | | built 1888; 1995 NRHP-listed | W3963 Brehm Ave. 45°16′50″N 90°15′2″W | Greenwood, Taylor County, Wisconsin | Late Gothic Revival |
| Our Lady of Loretto Church | | built 1880; 1990 NRHP-listed | Co. Hwy. C, 1 mi. W of Denzer; 43°21′3″N 89°54′17″W | Honey Creek, Wisconsin | Gothic Revival |
| St. John the Baptist Church | | built 1857; 1980 NRHP-listed | N9288 County Road W 43°52′36″N 88°17′26″W | Johnsburg, Wisconsin | Romanesque |
| Holy Cross Church | | built 1898; 1984 NRHP-listed | 309 Desnoyer St. 44°17′03″N 88°16′08″W | Kaukauna, Wisconsin | Diocese of Green Bay |
| St. Mary's Church | | built 1898; 1984 NRHP-listed | 119 W. 7th St. 44°16′27″N 88°16′34″W | Kaukauna, Wisconsin | Neo-Gothic and Ecclesiastical |
| St. John of God Church | | built 1891; 1979 NRHP-listed | 43°30′48″N 88°6′35″W | Kewaskum, Wisconsin | Gothic Revival |
| Cathedral of Saint Joseph the Workman | | built 1962 | 530 Main St. 43°48′40″N 91°14′55″W | La Crosse, Wisconsin | Modern Gothic Revival |
| Maria Angelorum Chapel | | built 1906; 2006 NRHP-listed | 901 Franciscan Way; 43°48′14″N 91°14′37″W | La Crosse, Wisconsin | Romanesque |
| St. Francis of Assisi Mission Church | | built 1884; 1979 NRHP-listed | 45°18′8″N 91°11′55″W | Ladysmith, Wisconsin | First church in Rusk County |
| St. Patrick's Church | | built 1889; 1982 NRHP-listed | 404 E. Main St. 43°04′37″N 89°22′44″W | Madison, Wisconsin | Romanesque Revival |
| Saint Joseph of the Lake Church | | built 1876; 2000 NRHP-listed | Address Restricted | Menominee Indian Reservation, Wisconsin | Gothic Revival |
| Basilica of St. Josaphat | | 1901 built 1973 NRHP-listed | 601 W. Lincoln Ave. 43°0′8.67″N 87°55′8.71″W | Milwaukee | Renaissance |
| Cathedral of St. John the Evangelist | | built 1847; 1974 NRHP-listed | 812 N. Jackson St. 43°2′30.43″N 87°54′14.88″W | Milwaukee | 13 large hand-cut stained glass windows |
| Gesu Church | | built 1894; 1986 NRHP-listed | 1145 W. Wisconsin Ave. 43°2′18″N 87°55′38″W | Milwaukee | French Gothic; Marquette University |
| Holy Trinity Church | | 1862 built 1972 NRHP-listed | 605 S. 4th St. 43°1′30″N 87°54′57″W | Milwaukee | |
| Old St. Mary's Church | | built 1847; 1973 NRHP-listed | 844 N. Broadway; 43°2′29″N 87°54′28″W | Milwaukee | Greek-Ionic |
| St. George Melkite Catholic Church | | built 1986 NRHP-listed | 1617 W. State St. 43°2′35″N 87°56′0″W | Milwaukee | Byzantine Revival |
| St. Patrick's Church | | built 1893; 1974 NRHP-listed | 1105 S. 7th St. 43°1′12″N 87°55′13″W | Milwaukee | Gothic Revival |
| Saints Peter and Paul Church | | built 1889; 1991 NRHP-listed | 2474 and 2490 N. Cramer St., 2479 and 2491 N. Murray Ave. 43°3′48″N 87°53′10″W | Milwaukee | Romanesque & Classical Revival |
| Saint Augustine Church | | built 1844; 1972 NRHP-listed | Off County Road W 42°31′59″N 90°20′1″W | New Diggings, Wisconsin | Italianate, Greek Revival |
| St. Peter's and St. Joseph's Catholic Churches | | built 1899; 1980 NRHP-listed | 516 Brazeau Ave. and 705 Park Ave. 44°53′29″N 87°51′54″W | Oconto, Wisconsin | Gothic, Romanesque |
| St. Mary's Church | | built 1882; 1977 NRHP-listed | 430 N. Johnson St. 43°23′30″N 87°52′10″W | Port Washington, Wisconsin | Gothic Revival |
| St. Patrick's Church | | built 1925; 1979 NRHP-listed | 1100 Erie St. 42°44′04″N 87°47′15″W | Racine, Wisconsin | Prairie School Style |
| St. Joseph Church | | built 1864; 1980 NRHP-listed | County Highway Q and Rich Rd. 43°14′28″N 88°47′16″W | Shields, Wisconsin | Country Church Style & Gothic |
| St. Lawrence Church | | built 1892; NRHP-listed | Jct. of WI 163 and County Hwy. J 44°23′58″N 87°41′5″W | Stangelville, Wisconsin | American Foursquare |
| Cathedral of Christ the King | | 1927 built | 1111 Belknap Street; 46°43′14.25″N 92°5′39.34″W | Superior, Wisconsin | Italianate |
| St. Augustine Church | | 1856 built 1856; 1990 NRHP-listed | Co. Hwy. Y 3 mi. S of jct. of Co. Hwy. Y and SR 33; 43°23′3″N 88°2′28″W | Trenton, Wisconsin | Romanesque |
| St. Wenceslaus Church | | built 1863; 1975 NRHP-listed | SE of Waterloo at jct. of Blue Point and Island Rds. 43°5′24″N 89°22′27″W | Waterloo, Wisconsin | For Czech community in origin |
| Saint Bernard's Church | | built 1873; 2003 NRHP-listed | 100,108 S. Church St., 111 S. Montgomery St. 43°09′40″N 88°55′16″W | Watertown, Wisconsin | Victorian Gothic |
| St. Joseph Church | | built 1888; 1983 NRHP-listed | 818 N. East Ave. 43°0′27″N 88°13′37″W | Waukesha, Wisconsin | Greek Revival, Late Victorian |

== Wyoming ==
| Church | Image | Dates | Location | City, state | Description |
|---|---|---|---|---|---|
| Church of Saint Anthony | | built 1997 NRHP-listed | 604 S. Center St. 42°50′37″N 106°19′29″W | Casper, Wyoming | Romanesque Revival/Italianate |
| St. Mary's Cathedral | | built 1906; 1974 NRHP-listed | 2107 Capitol Ave. 41°8′15″N 104°49′3″W | Cheyenne, Wyoming | Victorian Gothic |
| Our Lady Sorrows Church | | built 1932; 1997 NRHP-listed | A at Broadway; 41°34′58″N 109°13′18″W | Rock Springs, Wyoming | Romanesque Revival; Maginnis and Walsh |
| Saints Cyril and Methodius Church | | built 1925; 2015 NRHP-listed | 633 Bridger Ave. 41°35′28.7″N 109°13′11.9″W | Rock Springs, Wyoming | Romanesque Revival |
| Holy Name Catholic Church (Sheridan) | | built 1894 | | Sheridan, Wyoming | |
| Saint Patrick's Church (Casper) | | built 1961 | | Casper, Wyoming | |
| Church of the Holy Trinity (Cheyenne) | | | | Cheyenne, Wyoming | |
| St. John the Baptist Church (Buffalo) | | | | Buffalo, Wyoming | |
| Our Lady of Fatima Church (Casper) | | built 1954 | | Casper, Wyoming | |
| St. James Church (Douglas) | | | | Douglas, Wyoming | |
| St. Louis Church (Glenrock) | | | | Glenrock, Wyoming | |

== Related, other ==
NRHP-listed notable Catholic church-related properties, for which the corresponding churches are likely notable, or for which they should be added to List of Catholic schools, include:

| Church | Image | Dates | Location | City, state | Description |
|---|---|---|---|---|---|
| Blocton Italian Catholic Cemetery | | 1896 built 1999 NRHP-listed | Primitive Ridge Road; 33.112778°N 87.113611°W | West Blocton, Alabama | 86 funerary monuments |
| St. Columba Catholic Campus | | 1914 built 2005 NRHP-listed | 3514 West Market Street; 38.260882°N 85.809494°W | Louisville, Kentucky | |
| League of Catholic Women Building | | 1927 built 1997 NRHP-listed | 100 Parsons Street; 42.347778°N 83.061389°W | Detroit | Late 19th & 20th Century Revivals, Colonial Revival |
| Port Gibson Catholic Cemetery | | 1840 built 1979 NRHP-listed | 700 Coffee Street; 31.955698°N 90.979086°W | Port Gibson, Mississippi | |
| Saints Cyril and Methodius School | | 1920 built 2007 NRHP-listed | 144-146 Clinton Street; 42.105856°N 75.924546°W | Binghamton, New York | Late 19th & 20th Century Revival |
| Sisters of St. Dominic Motherhouse Complex | | 1878 built 2007 NRHP-listed | 555 Albany Avenue; 40.704442°N 73.403593°W | North Amityville, New York | Greek Revival, Gothic Revival |
| Enid Cemetery and Calvary Catholic Cemetery | | 1898 built 1996 NRHP-listed | 200 block of West Willow Avenue; 36.421667°N 97.879722°W | Enid, Oklahoma | Mission Revival, Neo-Classical |
| Catholic Belltower | | 1909 tower built 1980 tower NRHP-listed | Catholic Mission; 6.968417°N 158.211472°E | Kolonia (Ponape), Federated States of Micronesia | Originally a cathedral, now a belltower & an apse |

== See also ==
- List of Catholic cathedrals in the United States
- List of parishes in Louisiana
- List of parishes in the Roman Catholic Diocese of Albany
- List of parishes in the Roman Catholic Diocese of Fresno
- List of Roman Catholic churches in the Archdiocese of Atlanta
- List of Roman Catholic churches in the Diocese of Charleston
- List of parishes of the Roman Catholic Diocese of Honolulu
- List of churches in the Roman Catholic Archdiocese of New York
- Catholic churches in Vermont
- Catholic Mass Times: see Mass and Adoration schedules of United States churches
