= List of churches dedicated to Saint Joseph =

A number of churches and basilicas are named after Saint Joseph. Cathedrals are listed separately at St. Joseph's Cathedral. Notable churches include:

== Australia ==
- St Joseph's Church, North Ward, Queensland
- St Joseph's Church, Subiaco, Western Australia

== Belarus ==
- St. Joseph Church, Minsk

== Bosnia and Herzegovina ==
- St. Joseph's Church, Sarajevo

== Brazil ==
- St. Joseph's Cathedral, Fortaleza
- St. Joseph's Cathedral, Macapá
- São José Church, Belo Horizonte
- St. Joseph's Cathedral, Criciúma

== Canada ==
- Saint Joseph's Oratory, Montréal
- St. Joseph (Ottawa)

== Cambodia ==
- St. Joseph's Church, Phnom Penh

== China ==
- St. Joseph's Church, Beijing
- St. Joseph's Church, Jinan
- St. Joseph's Church, Shanghai
- St. Joseph's Church, Shaoxing

== Colombia ==
- Saint Joseph's Church, Envigado

== Croatia ==
- National Shrine of Saint Joseph (Karlovac)

== Finland ==
- Saint Joseph's Church, Kuopio

== France ==
- St. Joseph's Church, Le Havre

== French Guiana ==
- Saint Joseph's Church, Iracoubo

== Germany ==
- St. Joseph's Church, Königsberg
- St. Joseph's Church, Mühlhausen
- St. Joseph's Church, Starnberg

== India ==
- St. Joseph's Catholic Church (Baramulla), Jammu and Kashmir
- St. Joseph Church, Belman, Karnataka
- St. Joseph's Church, Chennamkary, Kerala
- St. Joseph Church, Kathanpallam, Tamil Nadu

== Indonesia ==
- St. Joseph's Church, Semarang

== Ireland ==
- St. Joseph's Church, East Wall

== Israel ==
- St. Joseph's Church, Nazareth

== Italy ==
- San Giuseppe Lavoratore, Alcamo, Sicily
- San Giuseppe Sposo, Bologna, Emilia-Romagna
- San Giuseppe Sposo di Maria, Fanano, Emilia-Romagna
- San Giuseppe a Chiaia, Naples, Campania
- San Giuseppe dei Ruffi, Naples, Campania
- San Giuseppe delle Scalze a Pontecorvo, Naples, Campania
- San Giuseppe Maggiore dei Falegnami, Naples, Campania
- San Giuseppe dei Teatini, Palermo, Sicily
- San Giuseppe in Ospedale, Piacenza, Emilia-Romagna
- San Giuseppe al Trionfale, Rome, Lazio
- San Giuseppe all'Aurelio, Rome, Lazio
- San Giuseppe alla Lungara, Rome, Lazio
- San Giuseppe dei Falegnami, Rome, Lazio
- San Giuseppe dei Falegnami, Todi, Umbria

== Japan ==
- St. Joseph Roman Catholic Church, Nishijin, Kyoto

== Jordan ==
- St. Joseph's Church, Amman

== Latvia ==
- St. Joseph's Church, Riga

== Lithuania ==
- Church of St. Joseph the Betrothed, Vilnius

== Macao ==
- St. Joseph the Worker Church (Macau)

== Malaysia ==
- St. Joseph's Cathedral, Kuching, Sarawak

== Malta ==
- Parish Church of St Joseph, Manikata
- St Joseph's Church, Msida
- Church of St Joseph, Santa Venera
- Old St Joseph's in the Citadel, Victoria

== Netherlands ==
- St. Joseph, Leiden

== New Zealand ==
- St Joseph's Church, Mt Victoria
- St Joseph's Church, Darfield

== Philippines ==
- Mandaue Church (National Shrine of Saint Joseph)
- Saint Joseph Church (Las Piñas), Metro Manila
- Santuario de San Jose, Mandaluyong
- Saint Joseph the Patriarch Church (Batangas)
- Saint Joseph the Worker Cathedral, San Jose, Occidental Mindoro
- Dingras Church (Saint Joseph Parish Church), Dingras, Ilocos Norte
- St. Joseph Church (Baras, Rizal)

== Poland ==
- Church of St. Joseph, Craftsman, Bydgoszcz
- St. Joseph's Church, Klimontów
- Church of St. Joseph, Kraków (Podgórze)
- St. Joseph's Church, Lublin
- St. Joseph Church in Międzygórze
- St. Joseph's Church, Podgórze
- St. Joseph Church, Prudnik
- Carmelite Church, Warsaw (dedicated to the Assumption of the Virgin and to Saint Joseph)
- St Joseph's Church, Zabrze

== Romania ==
- St. Joseph's Roman Catholic Church (Sighișoara)

== Serbia ==
- Church of St. Joseph the Worker in Belgrade

== Singapore ==
- Saint Joseph's Church, Bukit Timah
- Saint Joseph's Church, Victoria Street

== United Kingdom ==
=== England ===
- St Joseph's Church, Aldershot, Hampshire
- St Joseph's Church, Birkdale, Merseyside
- St Joseph's Church in the parish of St Patrick's Church, Bradford, West Yorkshire
- St Joseph's Church, Brighton
- St Joseph's Church, Burslem
- St Joseph's Church, Dorking
- St Joseph's Roman Catholic Church, Gateshead
- St Joseph's Church, Handsworth, Sheffield, South Yorkshire
- St Joseph's Church, Hartlepool
- St Joseph's Church, Highgate, London
- St Joseph's Roman Catholic Church, Leigh
- St Joseph's Church, Maidenhead
- St Joseph's Church, Newbury
- St Joseph's Church, Preston
- St Joseph and St Francis Xavier Church, Richmond, North Yorkshire
- St Joseph Church, Roehampton, London
- St Joseph's Church, Wembley, London
- St Joseph and St Etheldreda, Rugeley, Staffordshire
- St Joseph's Church, Southampton
- St Joseph's Church, Stockport
- St Joseph's Church, Weston-super-Mare

=== Wales ===
- St Joseph's Church, Port Talbot
- St Joseph's Roman Catholic Church, Colwyn Bay

== United States ==
Churches include (listed by State):

- Saint Joseph's Roman Catholic Church (Mobile, Alabama)
- Old St. Joseph's Catholic Church, Nome, Alaska
- St. Joseph Catholic Church (Tontitown, Arkansas)
- Saint Joseph Parish (Mountain View, California)
- Cathedral Basilica of St. Joseph (San Jose), California
- St. Joseph's Church (Capulin, Colorado), listed on the National Register of Historic Places (NRHP) in Conejos County
- St. Joseph's Roman Catholic Church (Denver), Colorado
- St. Joseph's Polish Roman Catholic Church, Denver, Colorado
- St. Joseph Church (Ansonia, Connecticut)
- St. Joseph Church (Brookfield, Connecticut)
- St. Joseph Church (Danbury, Connecticut)
- Saint Joseph Church (Norwalk, Connecticut)
- St. Joseph's Catholic Church (Wilmington, Delaware)
- St. Joseph's Catholic Church (Palm Bay, Florida)
- Saint Joseph's Catholic Church (Macon, Georgia)
- St. Joseph's Catholic Church (Bovill, Idaho), listed on the National Register of Historic Places in Latah County, Idaho
- St. Joseph's Catholic Church (Pocatello, Idaho)
- St. Joseph the Betrothed Ukrainian Greek Catholic Church, Chicago, Illinois
- St. Joseph Roman Catholic Church (Chicago), Illinois
- St. Joseph Catholic Church (Wilmette, Illinois)
- St. Joseph's Catholic Church (Jasper, Indiana)
- St. Joseph's Catholic Church (Bauer, Iowa)
- St. Joseph's Catholic Church (Davenport, Iowa)
- Saint Joseph's Prairie Church, Dubuque, Iowa
- St. Joseph's Catholic Church (Elkader, Iowa)
- St. Joseph's Church Complex (Fort Madison, Iowa)
- Saint Joseph's Catholic Church (Key West, Iowa)
- St. Joseph's Roman Catholic Church (Stone City, Iowa)
- St. Joseph Catholic Church (Damar, Kansas)
- St. Joseph's Catholic Church (Topeka, Kansas)
- St. Joseph's Catholic Church (Bowling Green, Kentucky)
- St. Joseph Catholic Church (Camp Springs, Kentucky)
- St. Joseph's Catholic Church (Owensboro, Kentucky)
- Saint Joseph's Church (Biddeford, Maine)
- St. Joseph's Catholic Church (Lewiston, Maine)
- St. Joseph Catholic Church (Boston, Massachusetts)
- St. Joseph's Church (Fall River, Massachusetts)
- St. Joseph Catholic Church (Roxbury, Massachusetts)
- St. Joseph's Church (Springfield, Massachusetts)
- Saint Joseph Church and Shrine, Cambridge Township, Michigan
- St. Joseph Oratory, Detroit, Michigan
- Saint Joseph Church and Shrine, Lenawee County, Michigan
- St. Joseph Roman Catholic Church (Apple Creek, Missouri)
- St. Joseph's Roman Catholic Church (St. Louis, Missouri), listed on the National Register of Historic Places in St. Louis
- St. Joseph Church (Westphalia, Missouri)
- St. Joseph's Catholic Church (Hardin, Montana)
- St. Joseph's Catholic Church (Moiese, Montana)
- St. Joseph's Catholic Mission Church, Townsend, Montana,
- St. Joseph's Polish Catholic Church, Camden, New Jersey
- Church of St. Joseph (Bronxville, New York)
- St. Joseph Church (Yorkville, Manhattan), New York
- St. Joseph's Church (Utica, New York), listed on the NRHP
- St. Joseph's Catholic Church (Mountain Island, North Carolina)
- St. Joseph's Catholic Church (Egypt, Ohio)
- St. Joseph Catholic Church (Ironton, Ohio)
- St. Joseph's Catholic Church (Springfield, Ohio)
- Saint Joseph's Roman Catholic Church (Massillon, Ohio)
- St. Joseph's Catholic Church (Krebs, Oklahoma)
- St. Joseph's Catholic Church (Salem, Oregon)
- Old St. Joseph's Church, Philadelphia, Pennsylvania
- St. Joseph's Roman Catholic Church (Providence, Rhode Island)
- St. Joseph Church (St. Joseph, Tennessee)
- St. Joseph's Church (Galveston, Texas)
- St. Joseph Catholic Church (San Antonio, Texas)
- Saint Joseph Catholic Church (Alexandria, Virginia)
- St. Joseph's Church (Seattle), Washington
- National Shrine of Saint Joseph (De Pere, Wisconsin)
- Saint Joseph's Oratory (Green Bay, Wisconsin), now named St. Patrick's Oratory
- St. Peter's and St. Joseph's Catholic Churches, Oconto, Wisconsin
- St. Joseph's Roman Catholic Church (Shields, Wisconsin)
- St. Joseph's Catholic Church Complex (Waukesha, Wisconsin)
- Saint Joseph of the Lake Church and Cemetery, Menominee Indian Reservation, Wisconsin

== Vietnam ==
- St. Joseph's Cathedral, Hanoi
