= Hōchōdō =

Traditional Japanese culinary art form

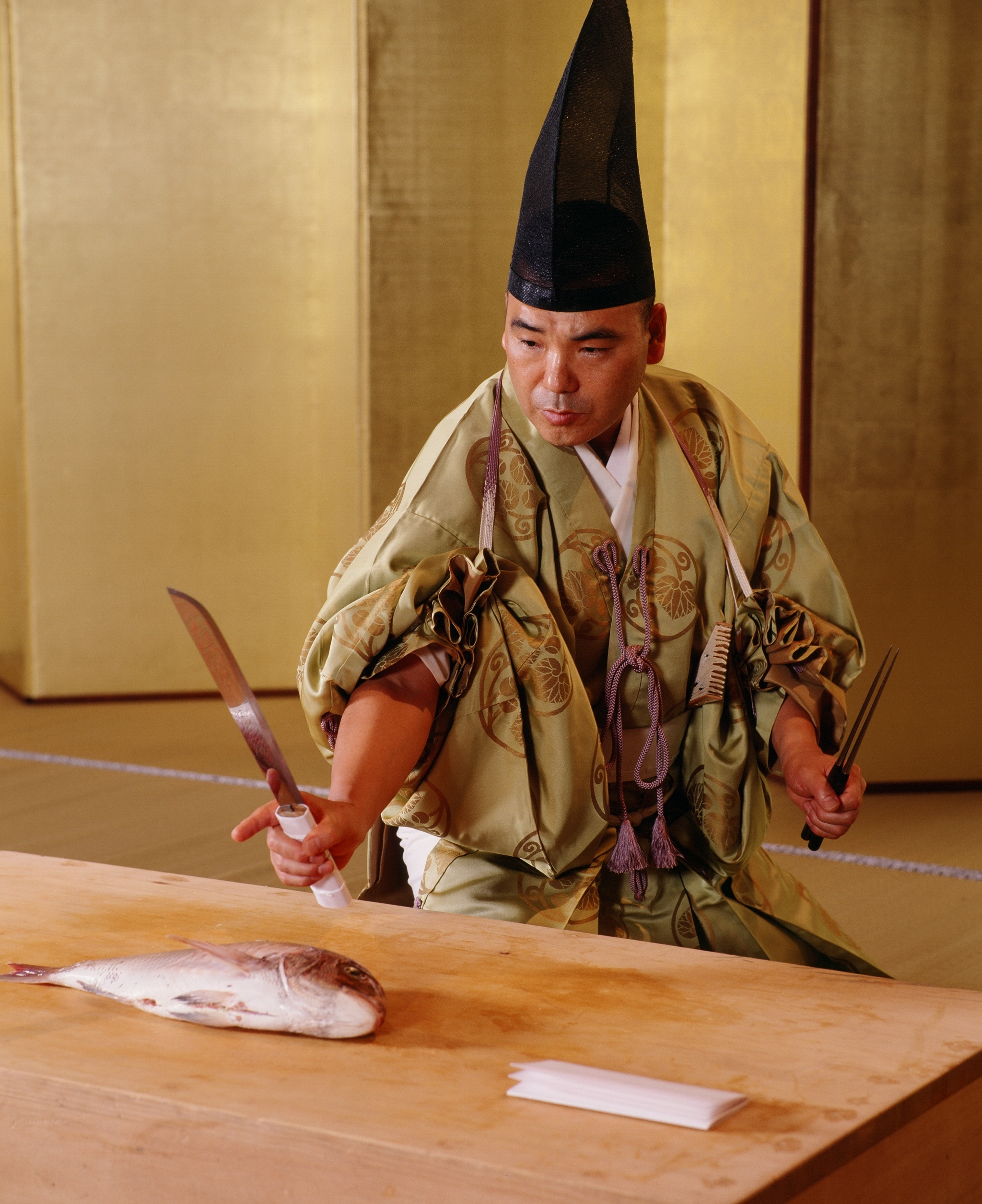
Chef Yoshimi Tanigawa of Kichisen demonstrating Ikama school knife ceremony

Hōchōdō (庖丁道; the way of the cleaver) is a traditional Japanese culinary art form of filleting a fish or fowl without touching it with one's hands.

It is also known as hōchōshiki (庖丁式; knife ceremony) or shikibōchō (式庖丁; ceremonial knife), and survives to the present day, with occasional demonstrations, particularly in Kyoto.

== Ritual origin ==
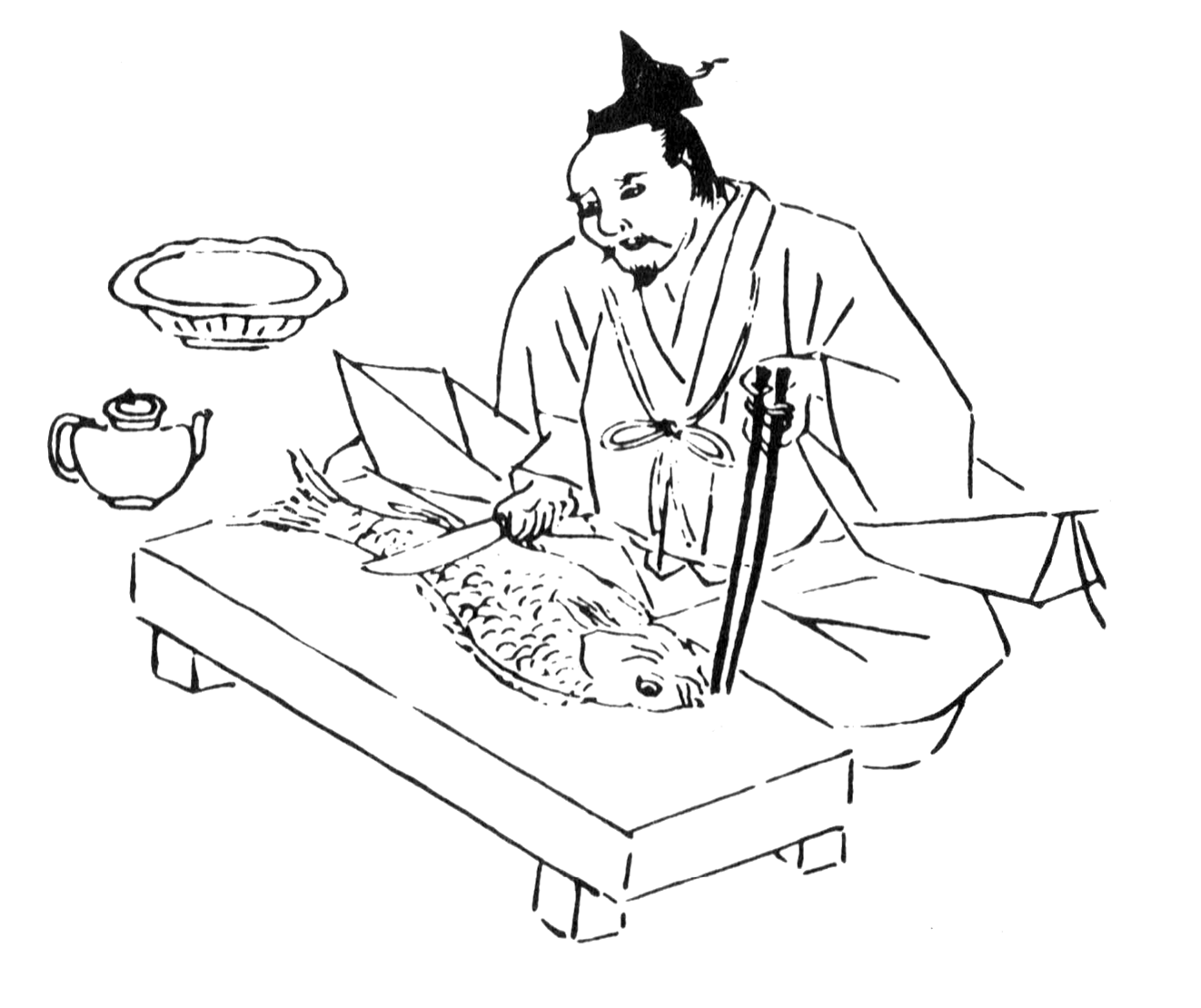
Drawing from circa 1500, in 七十一番職人歌合.

It is a Shinto ritual, properly an offering to the gods, and originates in the court cuisine of yūsoku ryōri, dating to the Heian period.

== Technique ==
The filleting is done using only a knife (庖丁, hōchō) (Note: 庖丁 is the spelling with traditional characters, while 包丁 is a simplification, and hence also commonly seen.) and a pair of metal chopsticks (真魚箸, manabashi), without touching the fish with one's hands. The chef is dressed in Heian period clothing, most notably an eboshi (烏帽子) hat and hitatare (直垂) robe. The hitatare features long sleeves and a drawstring, which is used to tie up the sleeves during the ceremony.

== Schools ==
The oldest school is Shijō school, "Fourth street school" (四条流, Shijō-ryū), which originated with Fujiwara no Yamakage (藤原山蔭) in the early Heian period (9th century). He was also known as shijō chūnagon (四条中納言; Fourth street middle counselor), due to the mansion he built at the intersection of Shijō Street and Ōmiya street (current Ōmiya Station), hence the name of the style.

The main surviving school is the Ikama school (生間流, Ikama-ryū). The current head (29th generation) is Shigeyoshi Konishi (小西重義) (art name Masayasu Ikama (生間正保)), of Mankamerō (萬亀楼) restaurant in Kyoto's Nishijin neighborhood. This style originated in the early Kamakura period (late 12th century), in warrior households that had been bestowed the "Ikama" name by the emperor. In this school the art is called shikibōchō (式庖丁), hence this name is commonly used today.

== Demonstrations ==
The ritual is occasionally done as an offering at shrines, with irregular schedule, and private displays are available by appointment with practitioners. The main event featuring hōchōdō is a demonstration by many practitioners at the Kyoto cuisine exhibition (京料理展示大会), held annually in Kyoto in December.
