= Saint Joseph Parish =

Saint Joseph Parish may refer to:

- Saint Joseph Parish, Barbados
- Saint Joseph Parish, Dominica

== See also ==
- St. Joseph Church (disambiguation)
