= St. Joseph Roman Catholic Church, Nishijin, Kyoto =

Roman Catholic Church in Kyoto city, Japan

St. Joseph Roman Catholic Church
- カトリック西陣聖ヨゼフ教会
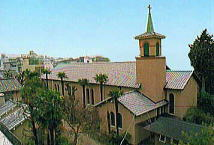
- St. Joseph Roman Catholic Church
- 35°1′36.2″N 135°45′21.1″E
- Location: Kyoto
- Country: Japan
- Denomination: Roman Catholic Church

History
- Founded: 1907

Architecture
- Completed: 1949

Administration
- Province: Osaka
- Diocese: Kyoto

The St. Joseph Roman Catholic Church (カトリック西陣聖ヨゼフ教会) is s a parish of the Roman Catholic Church in the Nishijin district of the city of Kyoto. It is the second oldest Catholic Church in Kyoto.

== History ==
The church was founded in year of 1907 in the vicinity of the intersection of Nijō and Shinmachi streets.

In 1909 the church was moved to the vicinity of the intersection of Kuromon and Nakadachiuri streets.

In 1917 the church closed temporarily.

In 1930 the church reopened and was moved near to its current location, but was then moved again to a site near the intersection of Ōmiya and Sasaya-cho streets.

In 1935 the church was moved again to the intersection of Ōmiya and Nakadachiuri streets.

In 1939, after a period of constant relocations, the church was finally moved to its current site 3, north of the intersection of Ichijō and Shinmachi streets.

In 1941 the church was closed for the second time, due to WWII, reopening in 1946.

In 1949 the church building that stands today was built.

The church celebrated its 100th foundation anniversary in the year 2007.

== Present day ==
Nowadays mass is held in Japanese at 9:00 a.m. on the 1st, 2nd, and 4th Sundays of the month.
