= St. Joseph's Church, Jinan =

- 济南圣若瑟堂
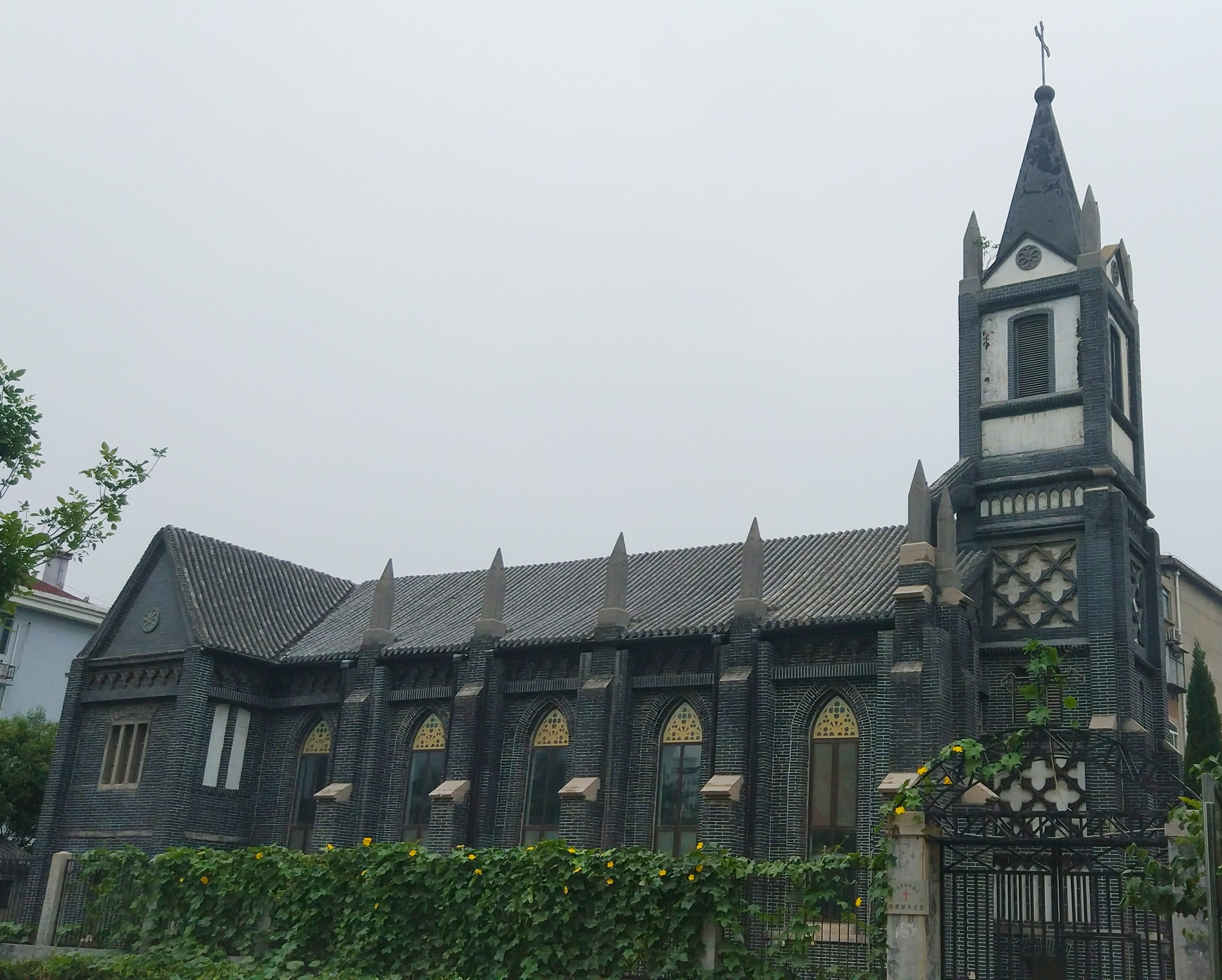
- St. Joseph's Church, Jinan in 2018

- Location in Shandong
- 36°40′51″N 117°00′35″E
- Location: Tianqiao District, Jinan, Shandong, China
- Denomination: Roman Catholic

History
- Status: Parish church
- Founded: 1660

Architecture
- Functional status: Active
- Architectural type: Church building
- Style: Gothic architecture
- Completed: 1907 (reconstruction)

Specifications
- Materials: Granite

Administration
- Archdiocese: Roman Catholic Archdiocese of Jinan

Chinese name
- Simplified Chinese: 济南圣约瑟堂
- Traditional Chinese: 濟南聖約瑟堂
Transcriptions
Standard Mandarin
- Hanyu Pinyin: Jǐnán Shèngyuēsè Táng

St. Joseph's Church, Chenjialou
- Simplified Chinese: 陈家楼圣若瑟堂
- Traditional Chinese: 陳家樓聖約瑟堂
Transcriptions
Standard Mandarin
- Hanyu Pinyin: Chénjiālóu Shèngyuēsè Táng

St. Joseph's Church, Jinan (Chinese: 济南圣约瑟堂), locally known as St. Joseph's Church, Chenjialou (陈家楼圣若瑟堂), is an early 20th-century Gothic Catholic church in Tianqiao District of Jinan, Shandong, China.

== History ==
The St. Joseph's Church was originally built in 1660 and was the second Catholic church in Jinan, Shandong, after the Church of the Immaculate Conception, Jinan. In 1907, Franciscan Italian priest rebuilt the church in Chenjialou with a Gothic architecture style.

In 2007, it was inscribed as a municipal cultural relic preservation organ by the Jinan government.
