= Saint Joseph Church and Shrine =

Historic church in Michigan, United States

- U.S. National Register of Historic Places
- U.S. Historic district
- Michigan State Historic Site
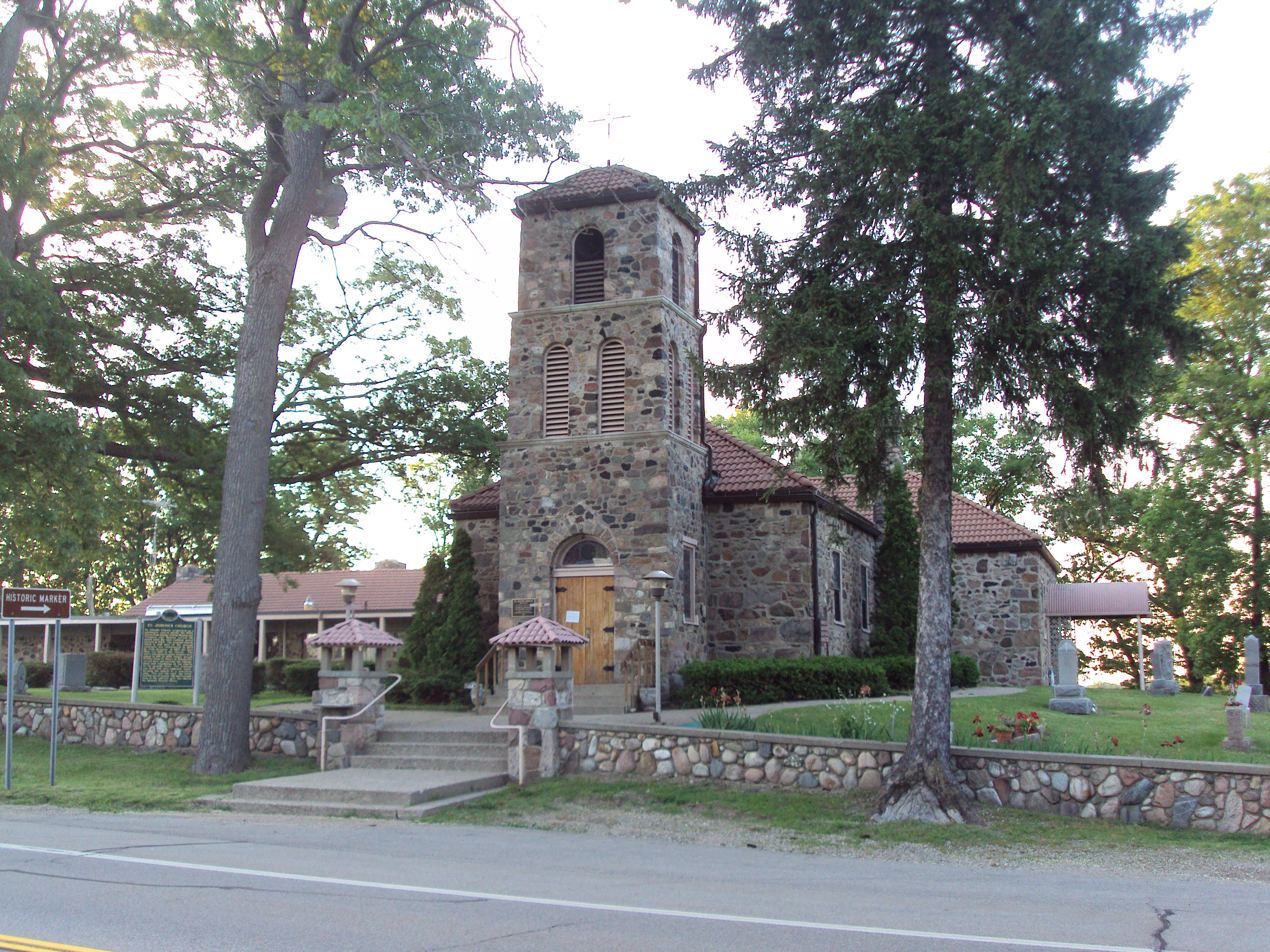

- Location within Michigan Location within the United States
- Interactive map
- Location: 8742 U.S. Route 12; Cambridge Township, Michigan
- Coordinates: 42°03′24″N 84°09′51″W
- Built: 1854
- Architect: Dionicio Rodriguez, Leo Ouelette, and Ralph Corona
- Architectural style: Spanish Colonial Revival, Mission Revival
- NRHP reference No.: 07000382

Significant dates
- Added to NRHP: May 4, 2007
- Designated MSHS: April 19, 1990

The Saint Joseph Church and Shrine is a historic district located at 8742 U.S. Route 12 in the Irish Hills region in rural Cambridge Township in Lenawee County, Michigan. The district was designated as a Michigan Historic Site on April 19, 1990, and added to the National Register of Historic Places on May 4, 2007.

== History ==
The church traces its origins to its founding as a missionary church in 1854 by the area's earliest Irish settlers. Irish Catholics had trickled into the area beginning in the 1830s, and they met in private homes for occasional mass. By 1852, a large enough number were in the area that a church was needed, and Humphrey and Ann Agan, and Martin Kelly deeded the site on which this church stands to the Bishop of Detroit. Work on the church itself commenced in 1854, and continued on and off until 1862. Originally, the church was a very simple fieldstone church with no exterior adornments.

The church's tower, sacristy, and stained glass windows were added in 1911. A new roof, transept, and sanctuary were added in 1928. In 1932, the shrine was completed under the supervision of Hispanic architects Leo Ouelette, Dionicio Rodriguez, and Ralph Corona. The first resident priest of the church arrived in 1954. and the church continues to function as a Catholic church.

== Description ==
The district consists of a church edifice and a shrine. The district also consists of a cemetery with graves dating back to the 1850s. The church is a fieldstone cruciform-plan structure with a hip roof. A square-plan, hip-roof bell tower at the front contains an entry vestibule. Both the church and tower are topped with a red ceramic tile roof. A 1954 addition is located in one corner of the church.
