= St. Joseph's Catholic Church (Topeka, Kansas) =

Historic church in Kansas, United States

- U.S. National Register of Historic Places
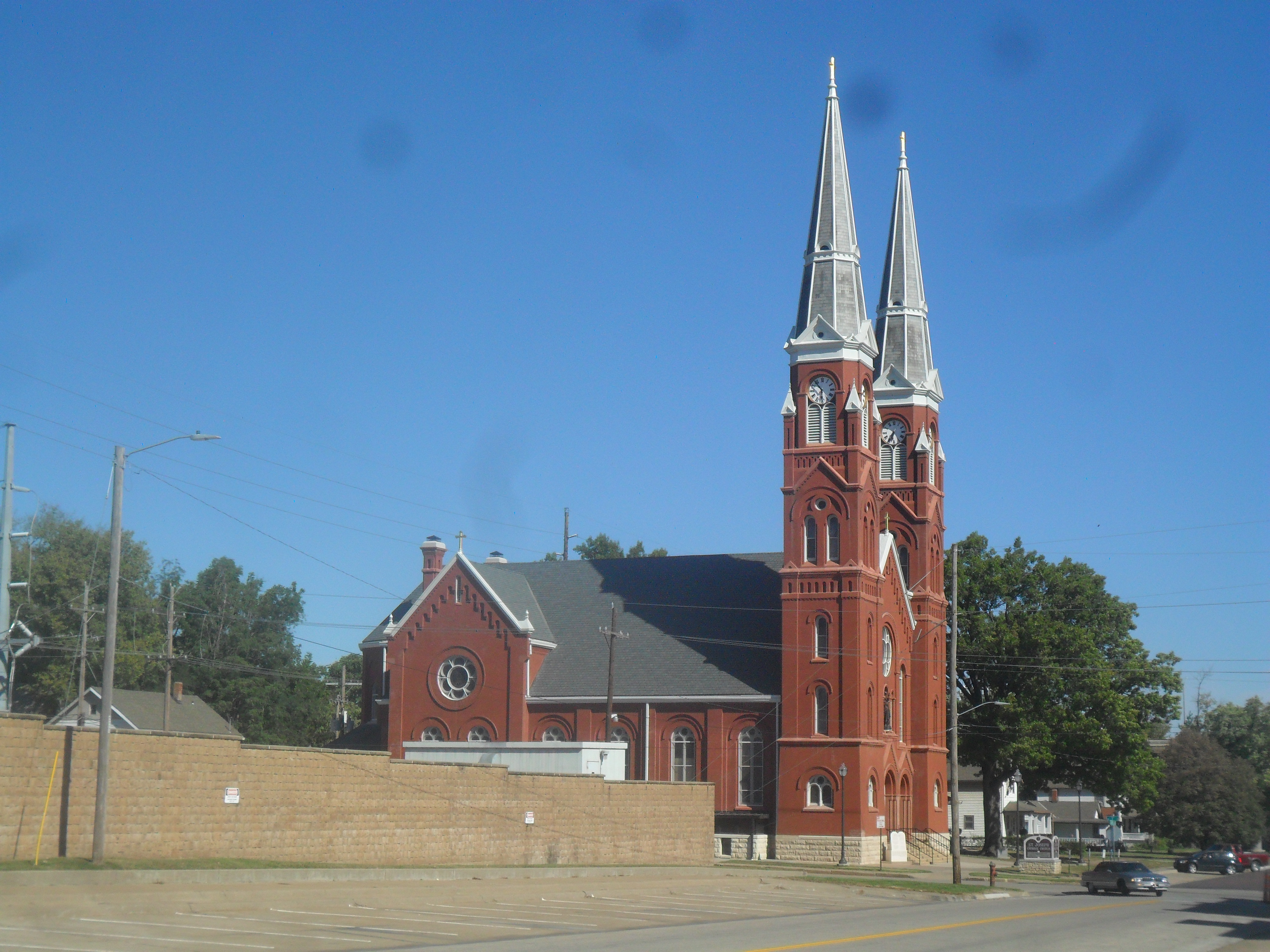
- St. Joseph's Catholic Church in 2018

- Location within Kansas Location within the United States
- Location: 235 Van Buren St., Topeka, Kansas
- Coordinates: 39°3′25″N 95°40′29″W
- Area: 1 acre (0.40 ha)
- Built: 1901
- Architect: Staudaher
- NRHP reference No.: 71000331
- Added to NRHP: February 24, 1971

St. Joseph's Catholic Church is a historic Roman Catholic church in Topeka, Kansas, United States. It was established to serve the needs of the growing population of Volga Germans, ethnic Germans from Russia.

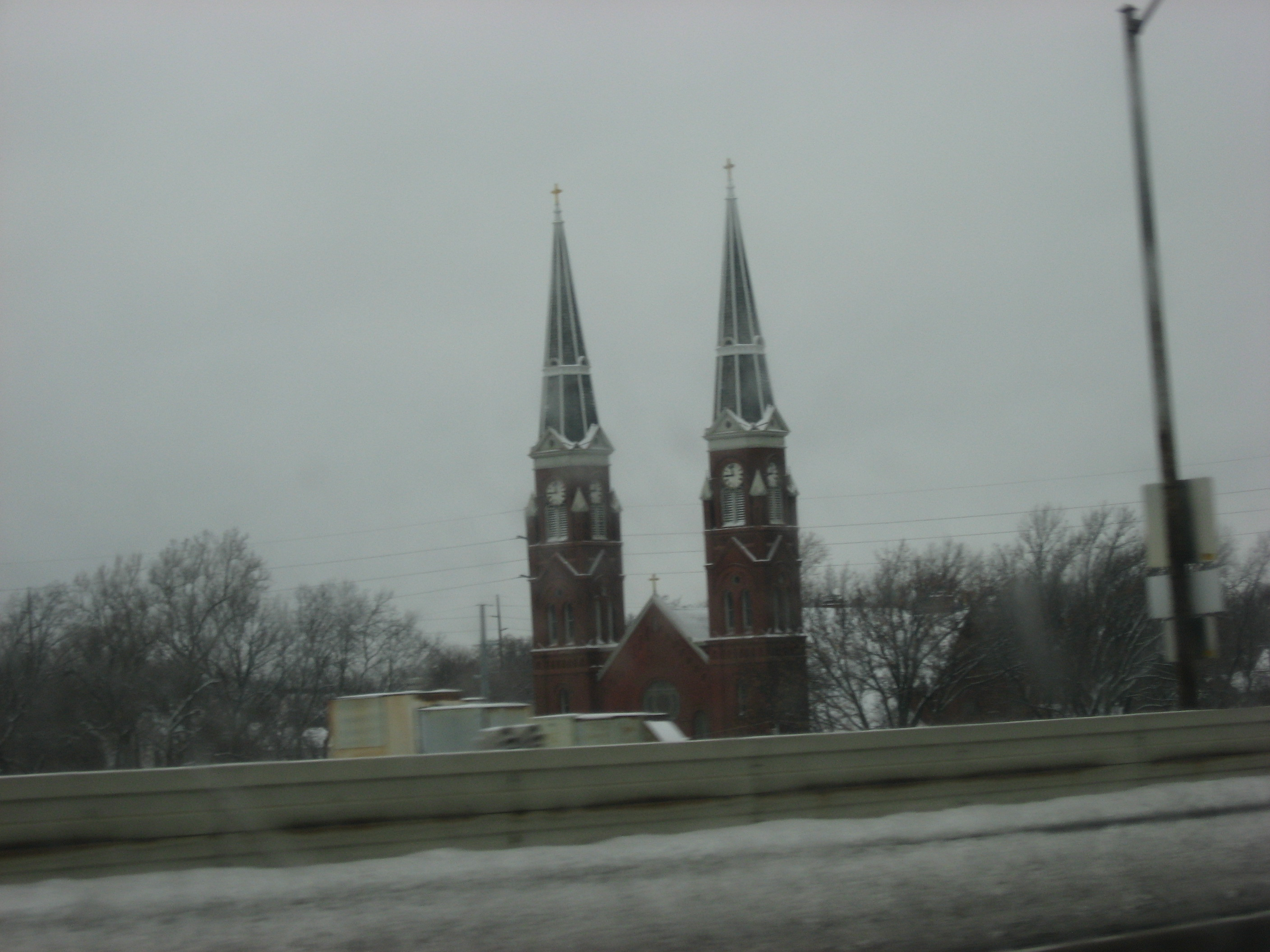
St. Joseph's, viewed from Interstate 70

The church was listed on the National Register of Historic Places in 1971. It was deemed "an outstanding Kansas example of a large 19th century brick church building."

It is a red brick church. Its NRHP nomination states: "Most impressive to one approaching the church are the two identical steeples towering over all the neighboring buildings and trees. These towers begin as squares and then are quite nicely transformed into octagons. This transformation is executed very gracefully by first cutting off the square corners at the clock level; the next logical step is an octagon roof with equal sides."
