= St. Joseph's Church, Riga =

Church in Riga, Latvia

Coordinates: 56°57′47″N 24°04′05″E

St. Joseph Church, Riga
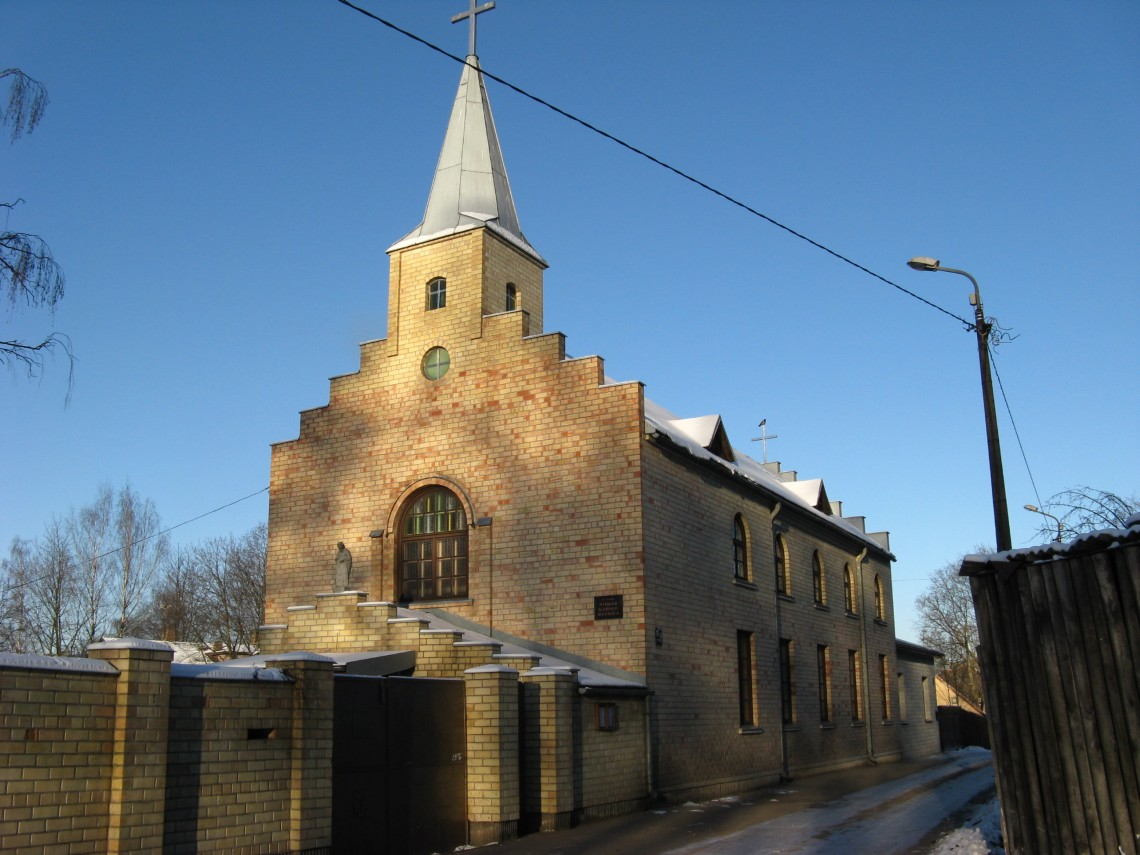

Religion
- Affiliation: Roman Catholicism
- Diocese: Diocese of Riga
- Year consecrated: 1992

Location
- Location: Embūtes iela 12/14, Riga, Latvia
- Interactive map of St. Joseph Church, Riga

Architecture
- Type: Church
- Completed: 1992

Specifications
- Length: 13 m.
- Width: 6 m.
- Materials: Brick

St. Joseph's Church (Latvian: Svētā Jāzepa Romas katoļu baznīca) is a catholic church in Riga, the capital of Latvia. The church is situated at the address 12/14 Embūte Street, in Iļģuciems neighbourhoud.

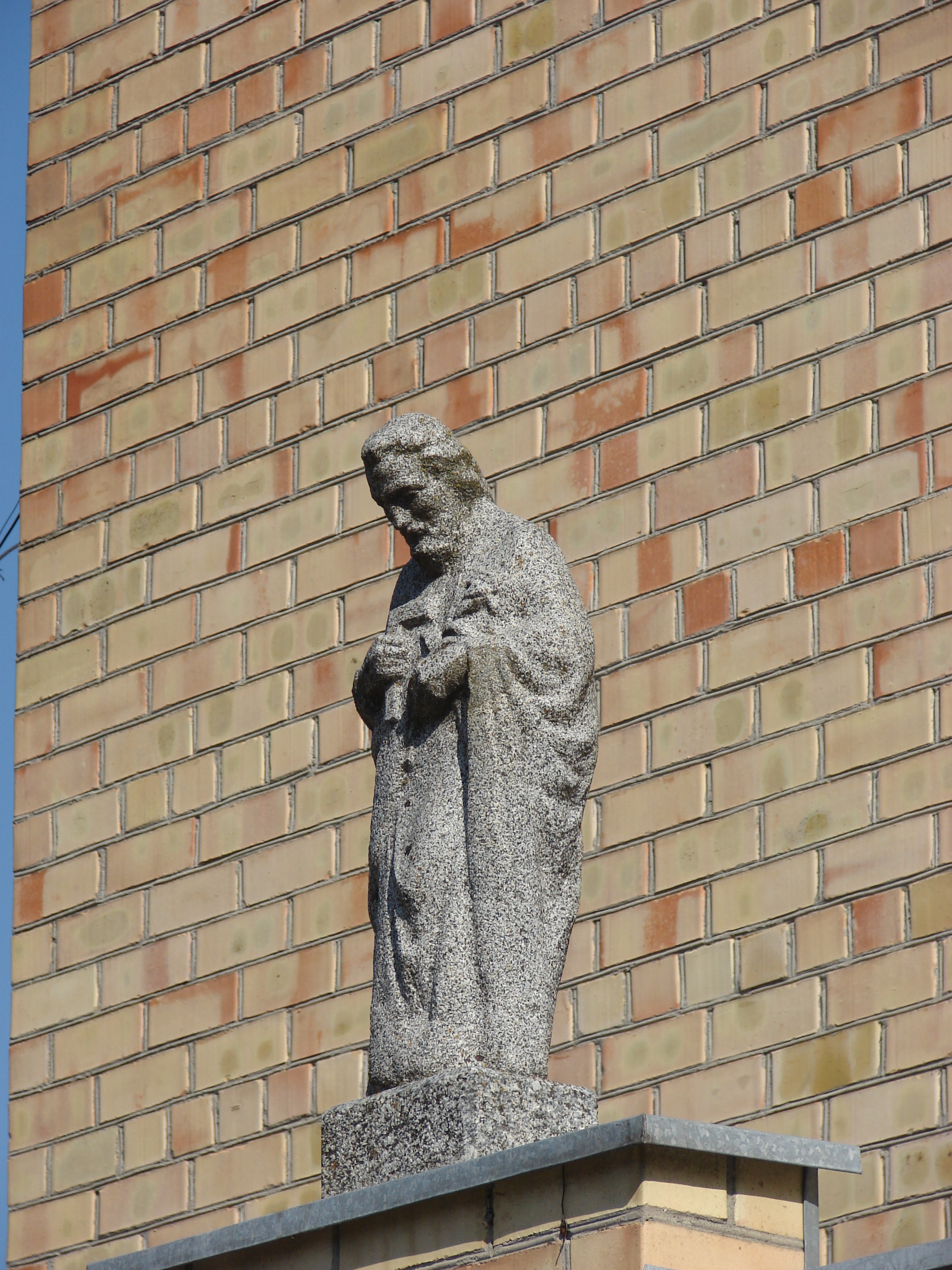
Statue of St. Joseph on church exterior
