= San Giuseppe a Chiaia =

Coordinates: 40.833210°N 14.228225°E

- Chiesa di San Giuseppe a Chiaia
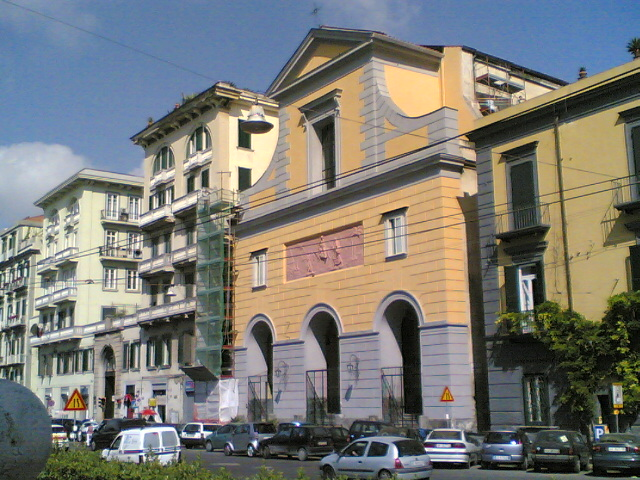
- The façade.
- San Giuseppe a Chiaia
- Location: Naples
- Country: Italy
- Denomination: Roman Catholic

Architecture
- Architectural type: Church

Administration
- Diocese: Roman Catholic Archdiocese of Naples

San Giuseppe a Chiaia is a church in Naples, Italy. Founded as a chapel for the Jesuit Order; it was enlarged during 1666-1673 under designs by Tommaso Carrere.

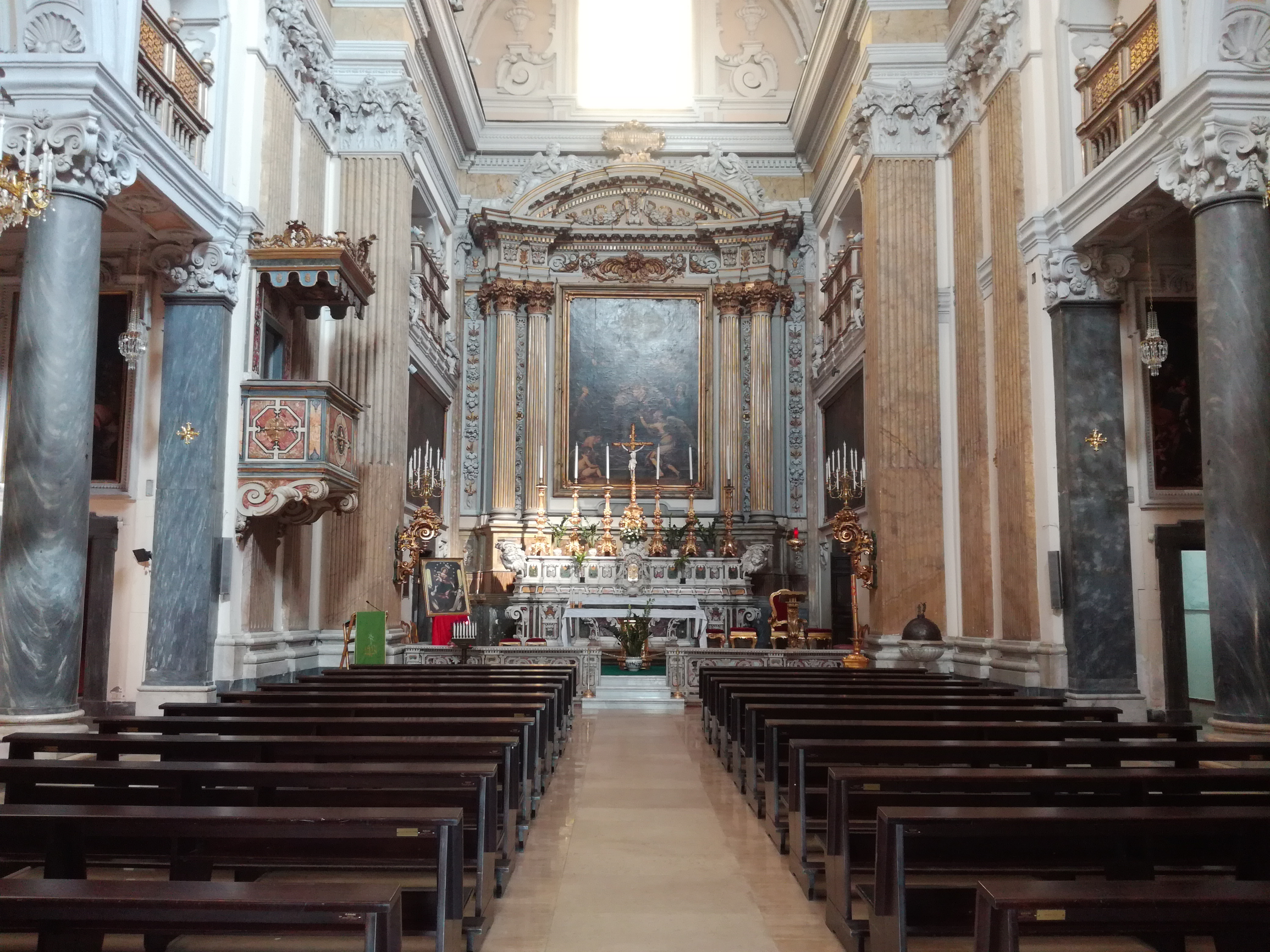
Interior

With the suppression of the Jesuit Order, the church changed management. About 1817, under the patronage of Ferdinando I it became a hospice for the blind called the Casa di San Giuseppe e Lucia.

The interior has a paintings of St Ignatius of Loyola by Luca Giordano, Family of the Virgin by Nicola Malinconico, a St Anne and Holy Family by Francesco di Maria.

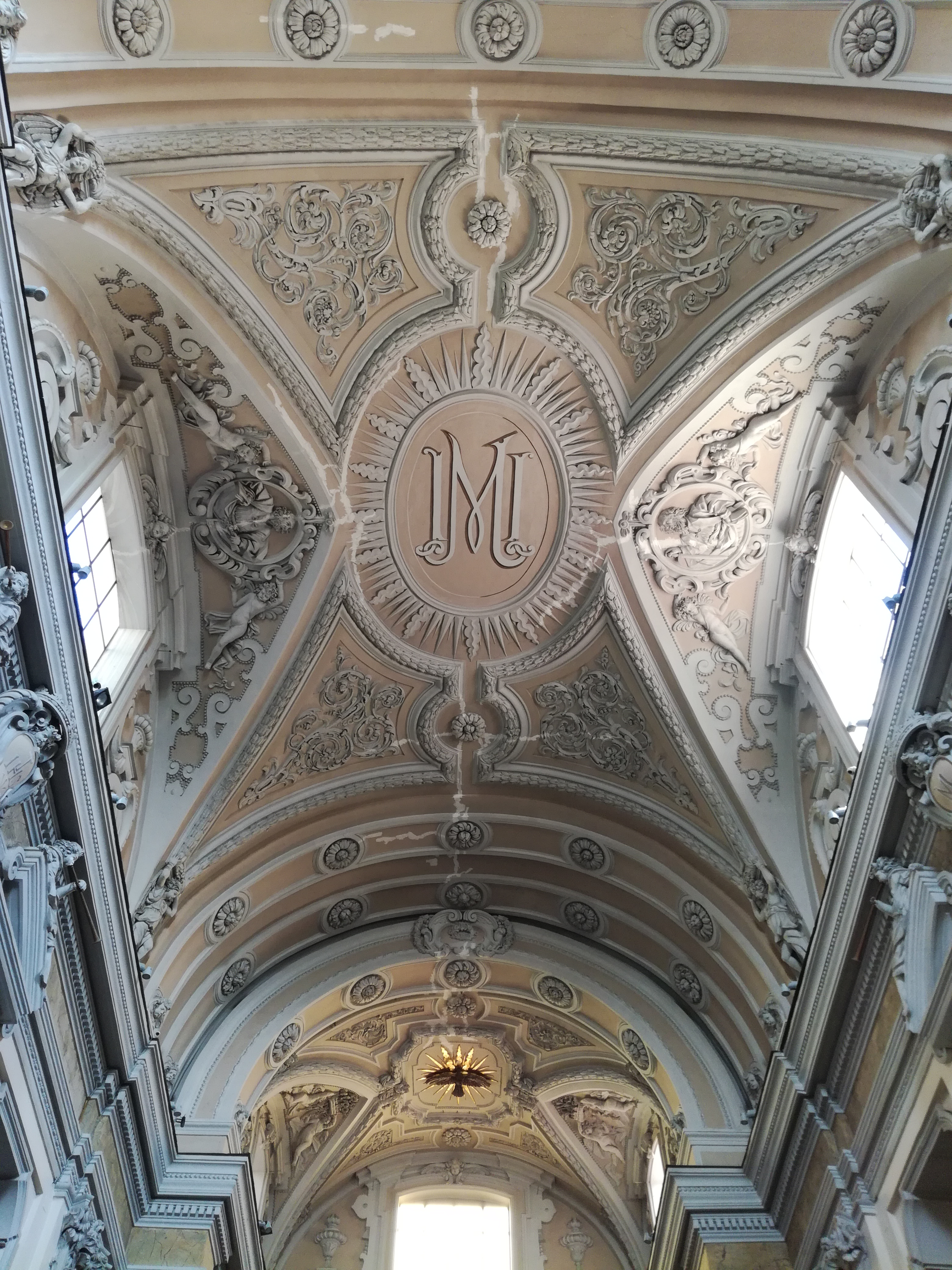
Stucco Ceiling

== See also ==
- List of Jesuit sites

== Bibliography ==
- Derived from Napoli e dintorni, Touring club Italia, Touring Editore, 2001. as quoted in Italian Wikipedia entry.
