= St. Joseph's Catholic Church (Hardin, Montana) =

Historic church in Montana, United States

- St. Joseph Catholic Church
- U.S. National Register of Historic Places
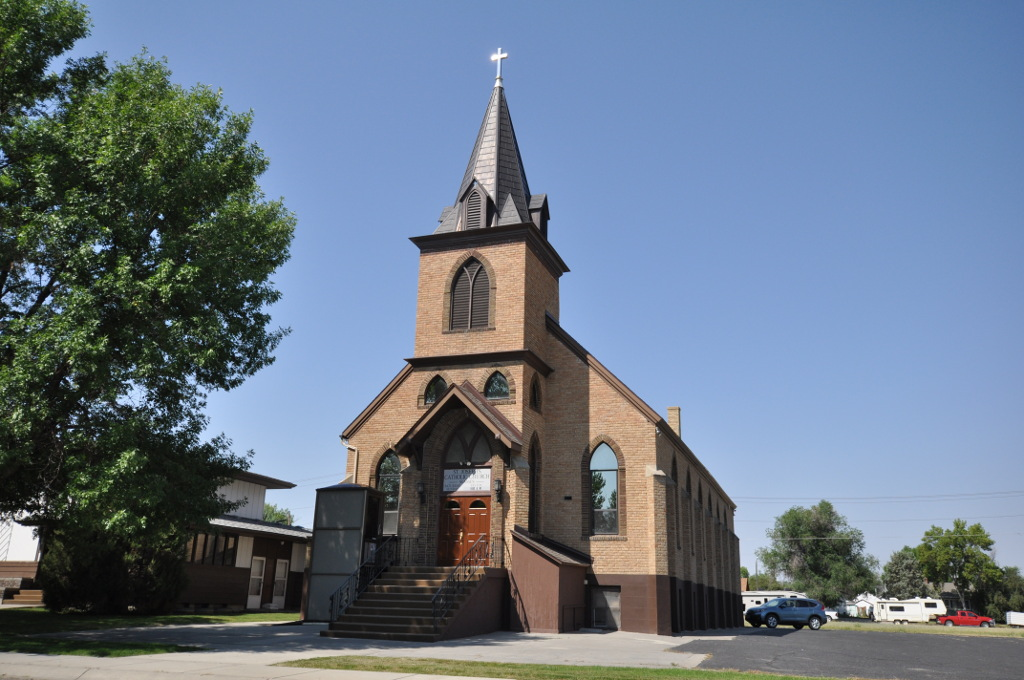

- Location within Montana Location within the United States
- Location: 710 N. Custer Ave., Hardin, Montana
- Coordinates: 45°44′9″N 107°36′26″W
- Area: less than one acre
- Built: 1919
- Built by: Russell, J. W.
- Architectural style: Late Gothic Revival
- MPS: Hardin MPS
- NRHP reference No.: 91000379
- Added to NRHP: April 11, 1991

The St. Joseph Catholic Church in Hardin, Montana, located at 710 N. Custer Ave., is a Late Gothic Revival-style church built in 1919. It was built by contractor J.W. Russell. It was listed on the National Register of Historic Places in 1991.

The church was deemed an "excellent example of Gothic Revival ecclesiastical architecture on a scale suited to a small, western rural town." It has a generally vertical character. Gothic Revival elements of its design include its steep roofs, its tall central portico rising to a steeple, and its tall Gothic-shaped windows with tracery and transoms.
