= St. Joseph's Church, Shaoxing =

- 绍兴圣若瑟堂
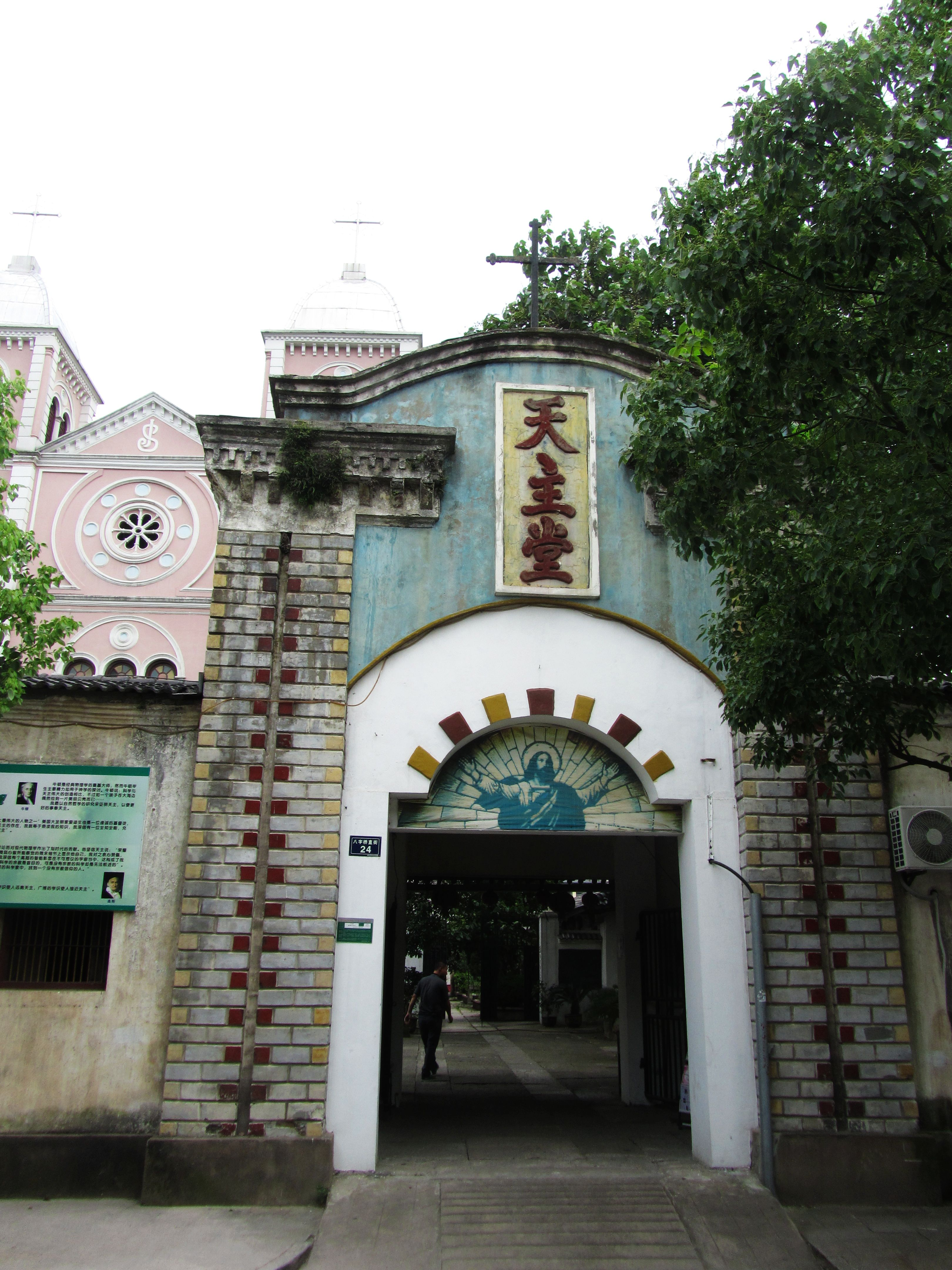
- St. Joseph's Church, Shaoxing in 2012

- Location in Zhejiang
- 30°00′23″N 120°35′51″E
- Location: Yuecheng District, Shaoxing, Zhejiang, China
- Denomination: Roman Catholic

History
- Status: Church
- Founded: 1871
- Founder: Andre Rene Guillot

Architecture
- Functional status: Active
- Architectural type: Church building
- Style: Romanesque architecture
- Groundbreaking: 1903
- Completed: 1907 (reconstruction)

Specifications
- Materials: Granite, bricks

Administration
- Diocese: Roman Catholic Diocese of Ningbo

Chinese name
- Simplified Chinese: 绍兴圣若瑟堂
- Traditional Chinese: 紹興聖約瑟堂
Transcriptions
Standard Mandarin
- Hanyu Pinyin: Shàoxīng Shèngyuēsètáng

St. Joseph's Church, Bazi Bridge
- Simplified Chinese: 八字桥圣若瑟堂
- Traditional Chinese: 八字橋聖約瑟堂
Transcriptions
Standard Mandarin
- Hanyu Pinyin: Bāzìqiáo Shèngyuēsètáng

St. Joseph's Church, Shaoxing (Chinese: 绍兴圣若瑟堂), locally known as St. Joseph's Church, Bazi Bridge (八字桥圣若瑟堂), is a Roman Catholic church located in Yuecheng District of Shaoxing, Zhejiang, China.

== History ==
The church was originally built by French missionary Andre Rene Guillot (1820–1887) in 1871. An extension of the entire church complex was carried out in 1903 by Italian missionary Jaoques Chianello (1865–1927), and was completed in 1907. Soon after, Benevolence Hall, Nursing Home, Nursery, Peide Primary School, Convenient Cloth Factory and Convenient Match Factory was successively added to the church.

The church was occupied by the Shaoxing Opera Troupe during the ten-year Cultural Revolution, and was officially reopened to the public in July 1988. In May 1993, it was designated as a municipal cultural relic preservation organ by the Shaoxing government.

== Gallery ==
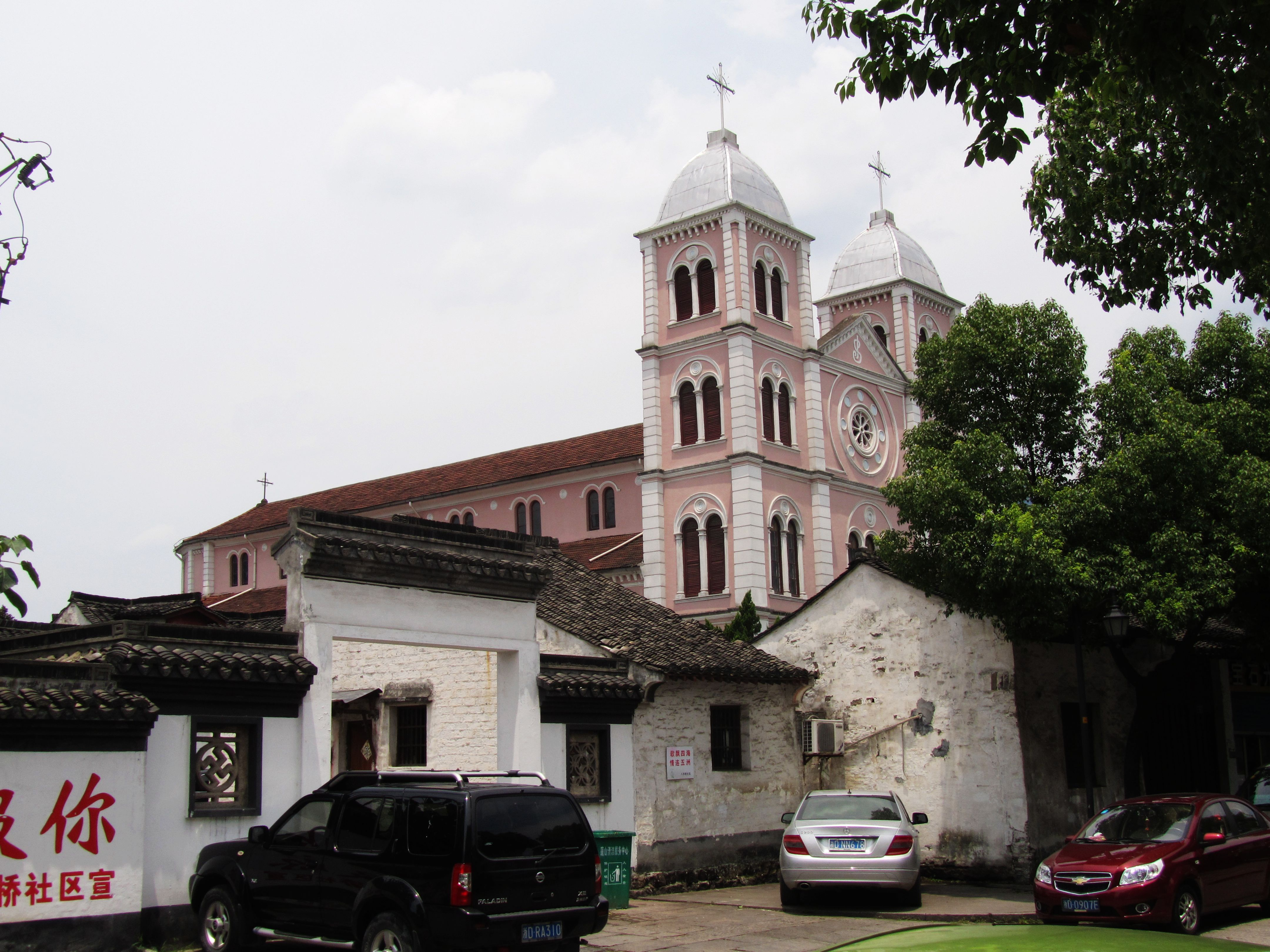

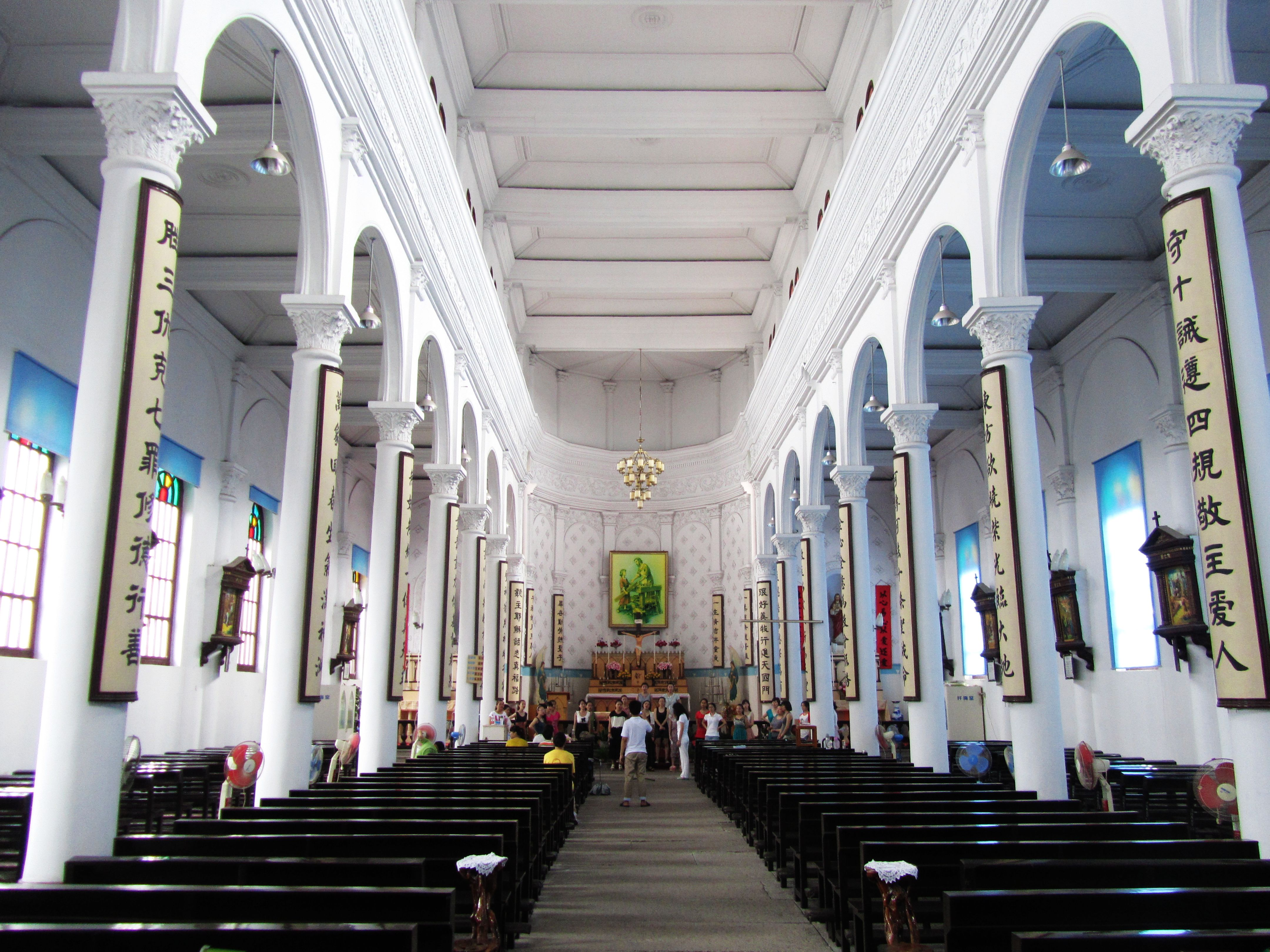
Interior of the church

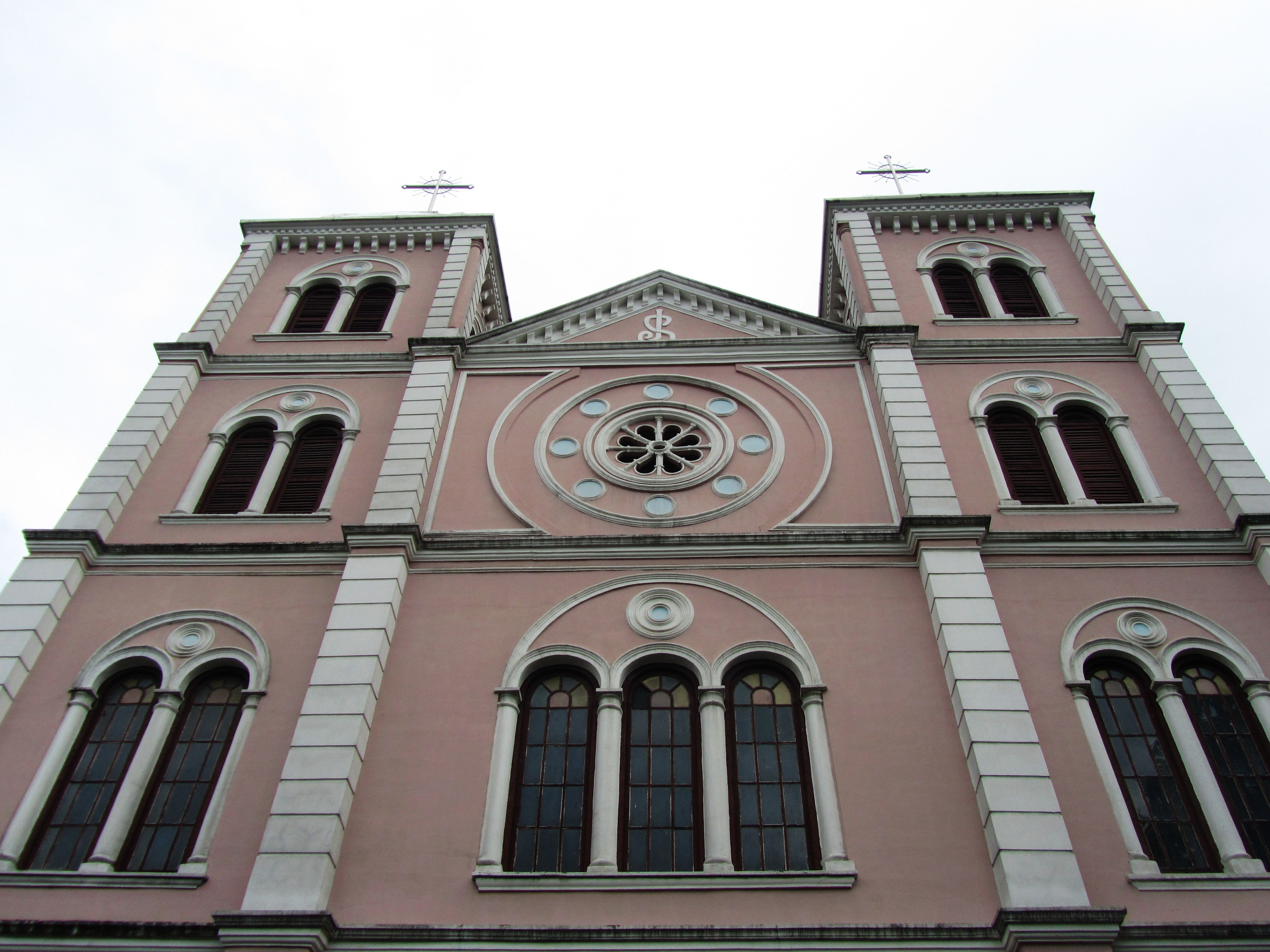
