= St. Joseph's Roman Catholic Church (Sighișoara) =

Romanian church

Coordinates: 46°13′16″N 24°47′34″E

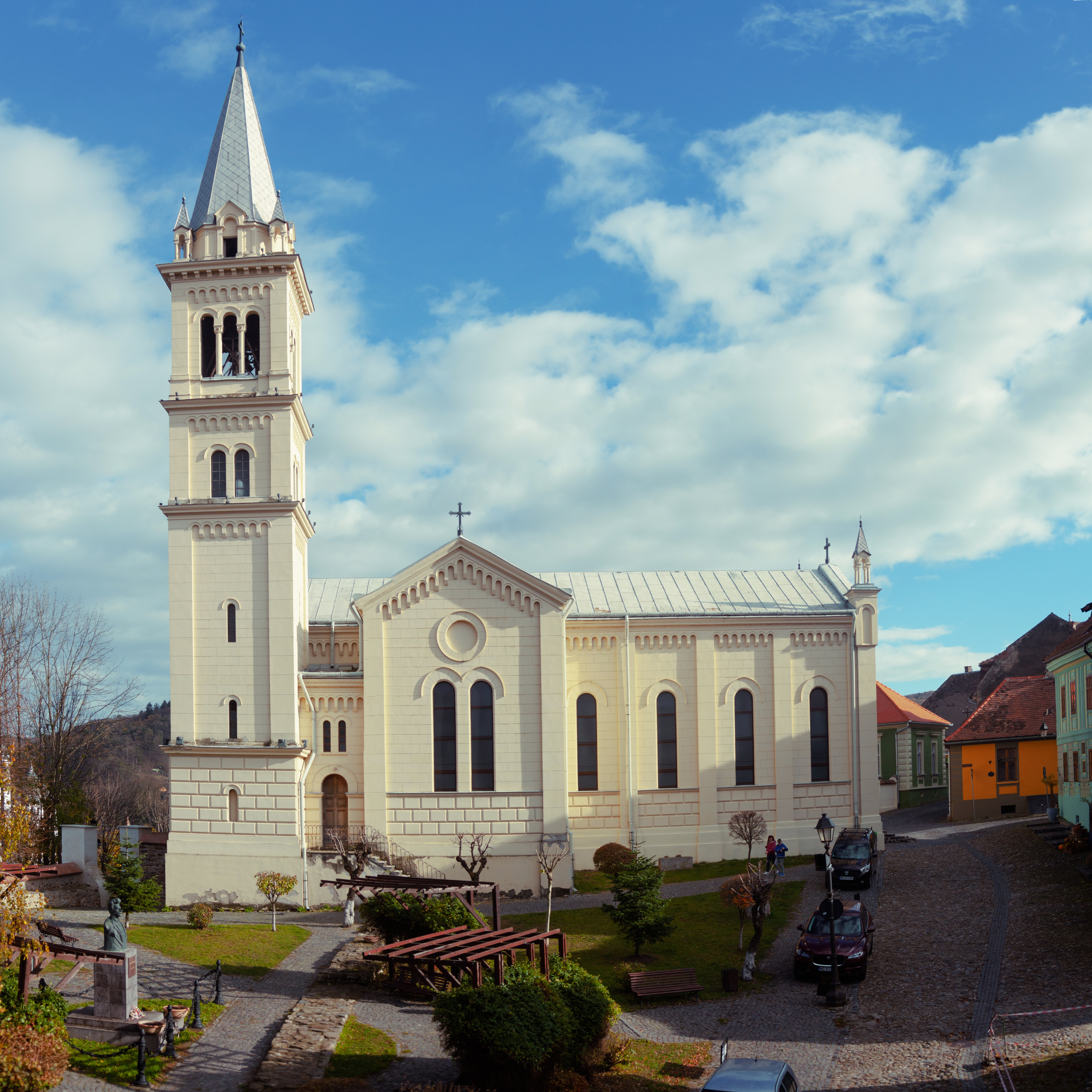
Saint Joseph's Roman Catholic Church

The Saint Joseph's Roman Catholic Church (Romanian: Catedrala Sfântul Iosif) is located on the north-eastern side of the citadel of Sighișoara, Mureș County in Romania, near the enclosure wall. Unlike the two other biggest churches of the city which were built by Transylvanian Saxons, this one was built by Hungarians. The monument was built between 1894 and 1896, after the demolition of the Franciscan nuns monastery and was designed by the architect Franz Letz. It follows an eclectic style with both Gothic and Neo-Roman elements and has a total length of 30 metres (98 feet). On the northern side it has a very tall belfry. The current interior is the result of changes occurred after the fire of 1983.

Between 2005 and 2007, the church was restored and renovated both internally and externally.
