= Church of St Joseph, Santa Venera =

Church of Saint Joseph
- Knisja ta' San Ġużepp
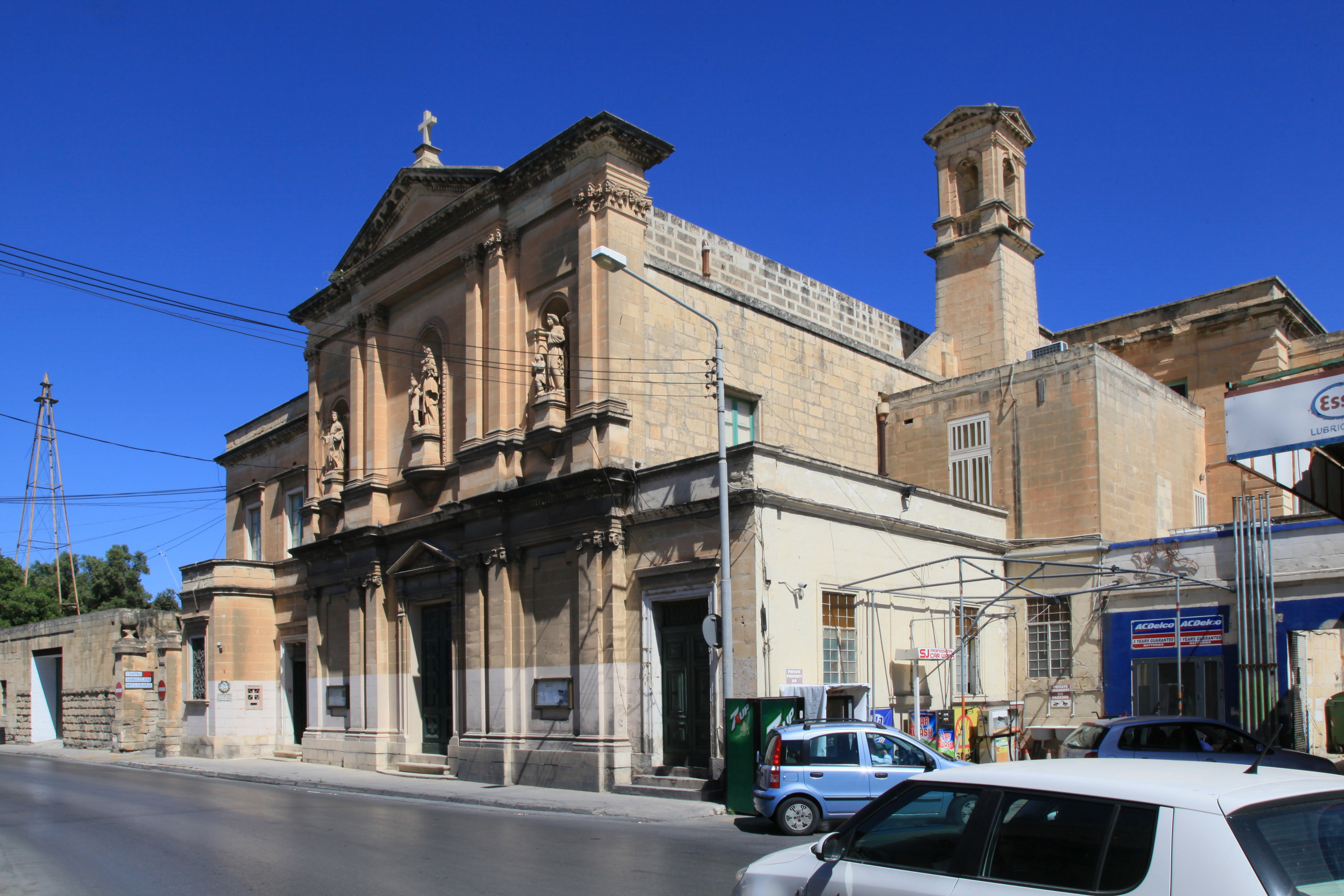
- The church in 2014
- Church of Saint Joseph
- 35°53′24.1″N 14°28′27.9″E
- Location: Santa Venera, Malta
- Denomination: Roman Catholic
- Religious institute: Missionary Society of St Paul

History
- Status: Church
- Dedication: Saint Joseph
- Dedicated: 14 May 1916

Architecture
- Functional status: Active

Specifications
- Materials: Limestone

Administration
- Archdiocese: Malta
- Parish: Santa Venera

The Church of Saint Joseph (Maltese: Knisja ta' San Ġużepp) is a Roman Catholic church in Santa Venera, Malta. It forms part of the St Joseph Institute which is run by the Missionary Society of St Paul.

== History ==
The Church of St Joseph forms part of the St Joseph Institute, and it was built on a plot of land which was acquired from the government to construct the institute. It was dedicated on 14 May 1916. The institute and church are currently administered by the Missionary Society of St Paul (MSSP).

Restoration works were carried out on the church's façade and bell tower by the Restoration Directorate between July 2019 and May 2020. The project was carried out under the direction of architect Jean Frendo at a cost of €59,000.

== Architecture ==
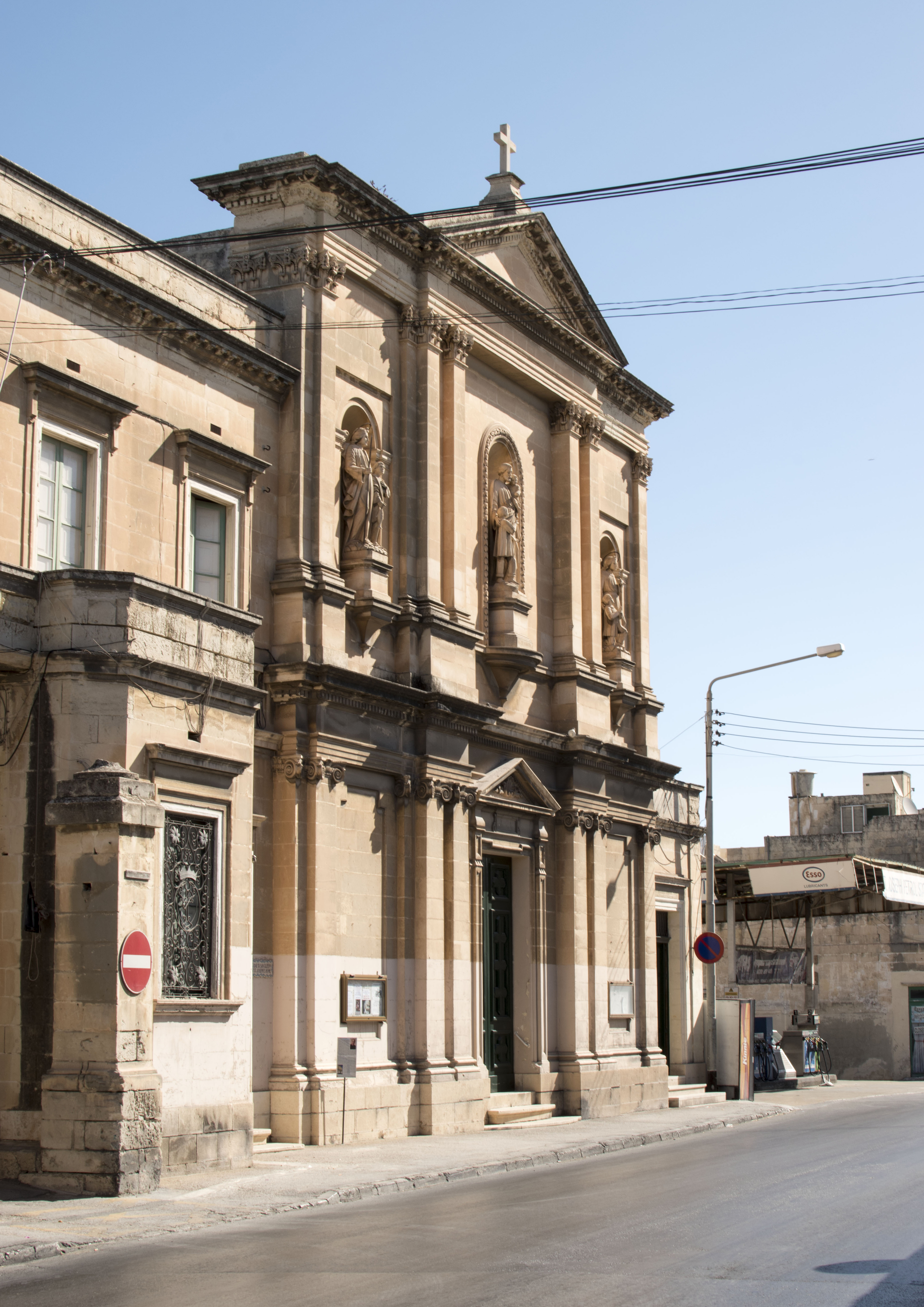
The church's façade in 2017

The church has a classical façade with two tiers, with the lower one being characterized by Ionic pilasters and containing the main doorway. The upper tier has Corinthian pilasters and it includes a central statue of St Joseph flanked by statues of guardian angels. A small bell tower is located at the rear of the building.
