= St. Joseph's Catholic Church (Owensboro, Kentucky) =

Historic church in Kentucky, United States

- St. Joseph Church
- U.S. National Register of Historic Places
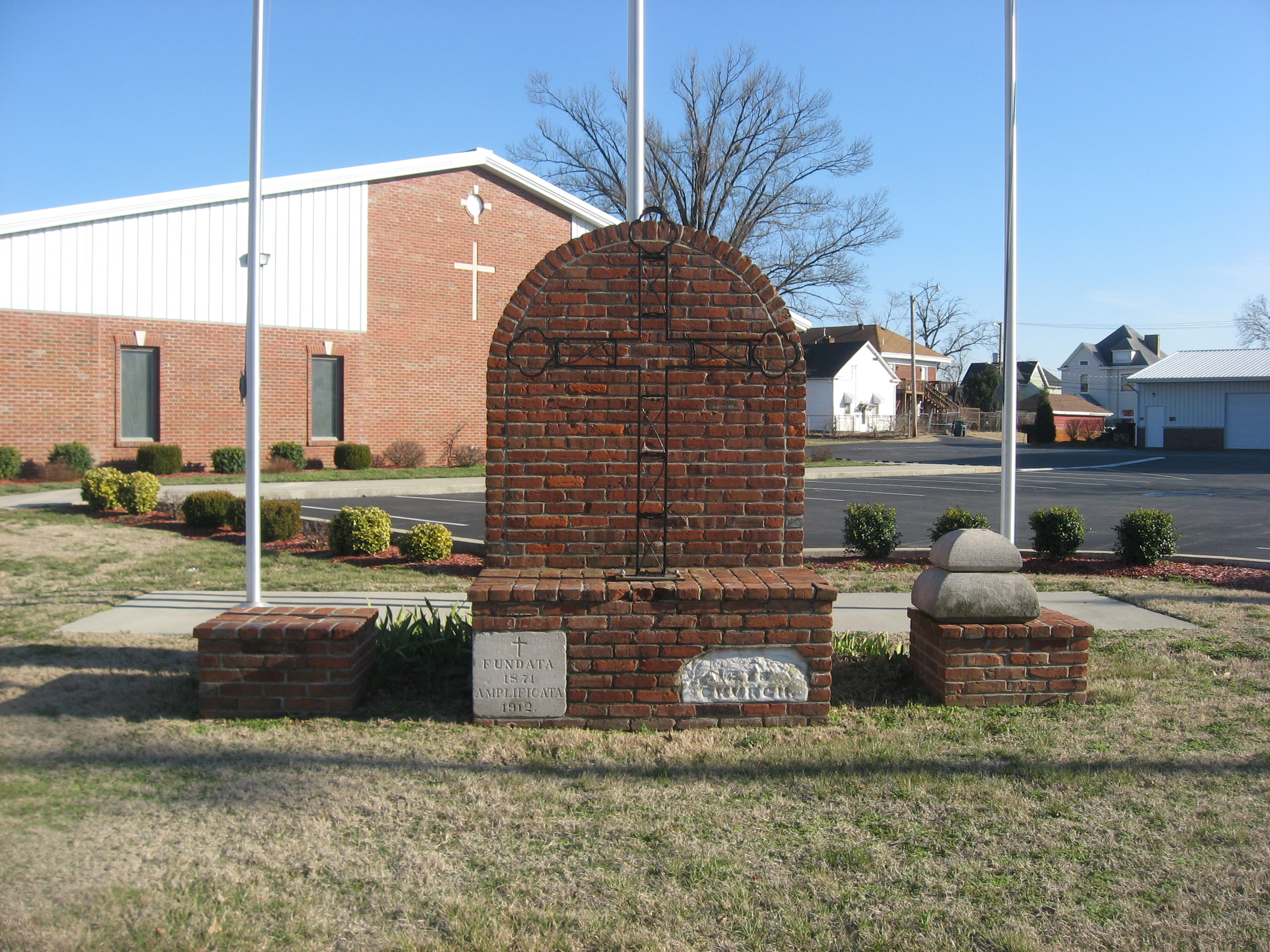
- Monument on the site of the demolished church, photographed in 2013

- Location within Kentucky Location within the United States
- Location: 4th and Clay Sts., Owensboro, Kentucky
- Coordinates: 37°46′21″N 87°06′21″W
- Area: 0.4 acres (0.16 ha)
- Built: 1878-1880
- Architectural style: Gothic
- NRHP reference No.: 83003651
- Added to NRHP: November 3, 1983

The St. Joseph Catholic Church in Owensboro, Kentucky, United States was a historic church at 4th and Clay Streets which was built in 1878 and demolished in 1989. It was added to the National Register of Historic Places in 1983.

It was deemed "significant as the best example of the Gothic Revival style of architecture in Owensboro and as the focal institution in the history of the German Roman Catholic community of Owensboro and Daviess County."

In 1948, the parish of St. Joseph was combined with the nearby Irish-American parish of St. Paul to form Sts. Joseph and Paul parish by Bishop Francis Cotton. St. Paul church was larger and newer so it was used as the main church. Regular services at St. Joseph ended in 1978. The church was only used for mass on special occasions until 1984 when a fire damaged the St. Paul church. St. Joseph was then used for regular mass until St. Paul's rededication in 1986.

The sixteen stained-glass windows of the church were gifted by the Diocese of Owensboro to the Owensboro Museum of Fine Arts in 1989 before the church was razed. The windows were created and painted by Emil Frei in the guild tradition and installed in the church between 1900 and 1910. The twelve largest windows are sixteen feet tall by four feet wide. The Frei family helped to restore the windows after the move.

It was a front-gable brick structure with a bell tower and eight-sided spire. It was 43 by 86 feet (13 m × 26 m) in plan.

Photographs of the church can be found here: six photos from 1977.
