= St. Joseph's Polish Roman Catholic Church =

Historic church in Colorado, United States

- U.S. National Register of Historic Places
- Colorado State Register of Historic Properties
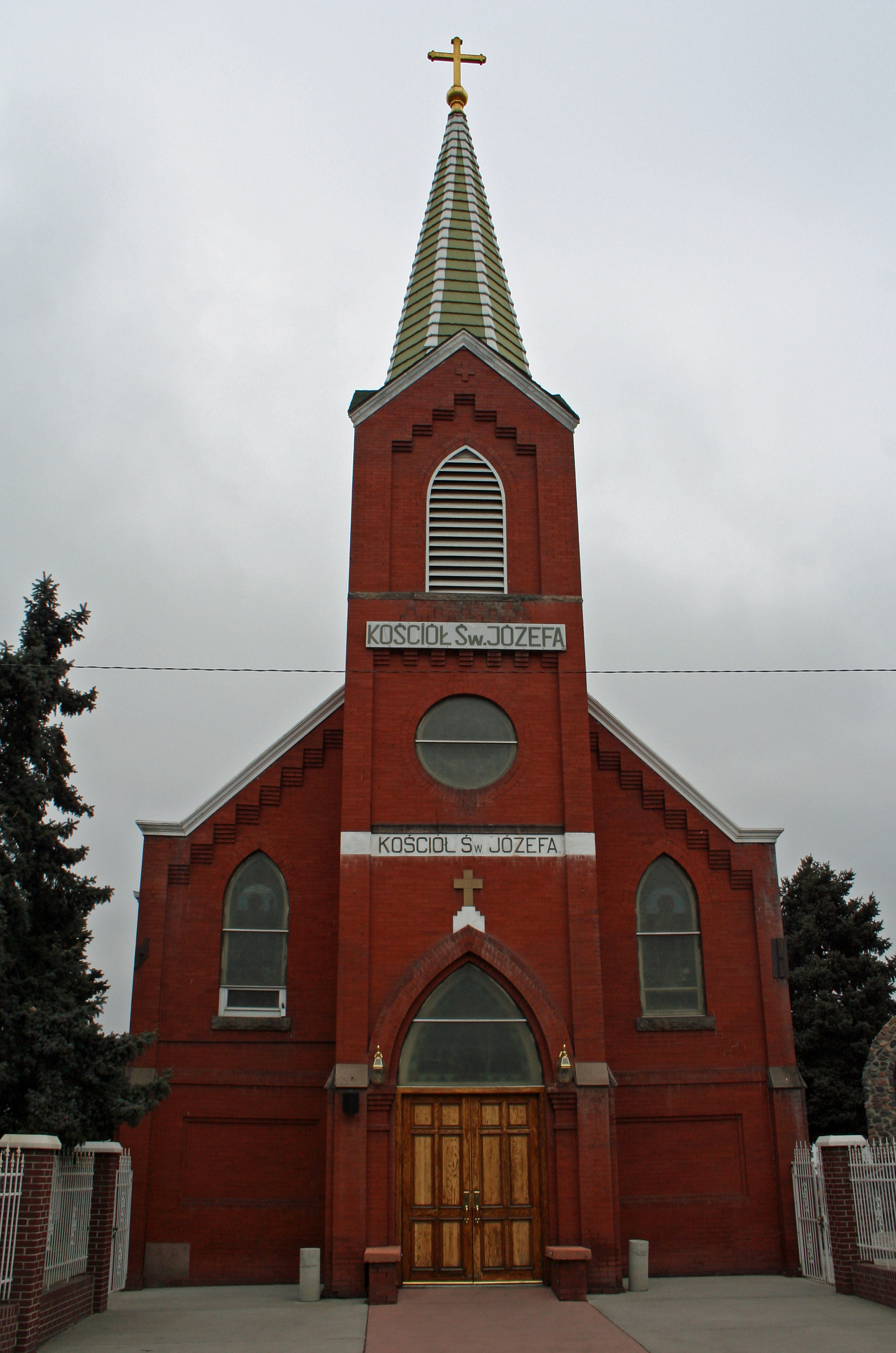

- Location within Colorado Location within the United States
- Location: 517 E. 46th Ave, Denver, Colorado
- Coordinates: 39°46′49″N 104°58′54″W
- Area: 0.1 acres (0.040 ha)
- Built: 1902
- Architect: Kirchof
- Architectural style: Gothic
- NRHP reference No.: 83001315
- CSRHP No.: 5DV.782
- Added to NRHP: April 21, 1983

The St. Joseph's Polish Roman Catholic Church is a historic church at 517 E. 46th Avenue in Denver, Colorado. It was built in 1902 and was added to the National Register of Historic Places in 1983.

It is 32 by 60 feet (9.8 m × 18.3 m) in plan and has some elements of Gothic Revival architecture. It was expanded in 1923.
