= St. Joseph's Catholic Church (Moiese, Montana) =

Historic church in Montana, United States

- U.S. National Register of Historic Places
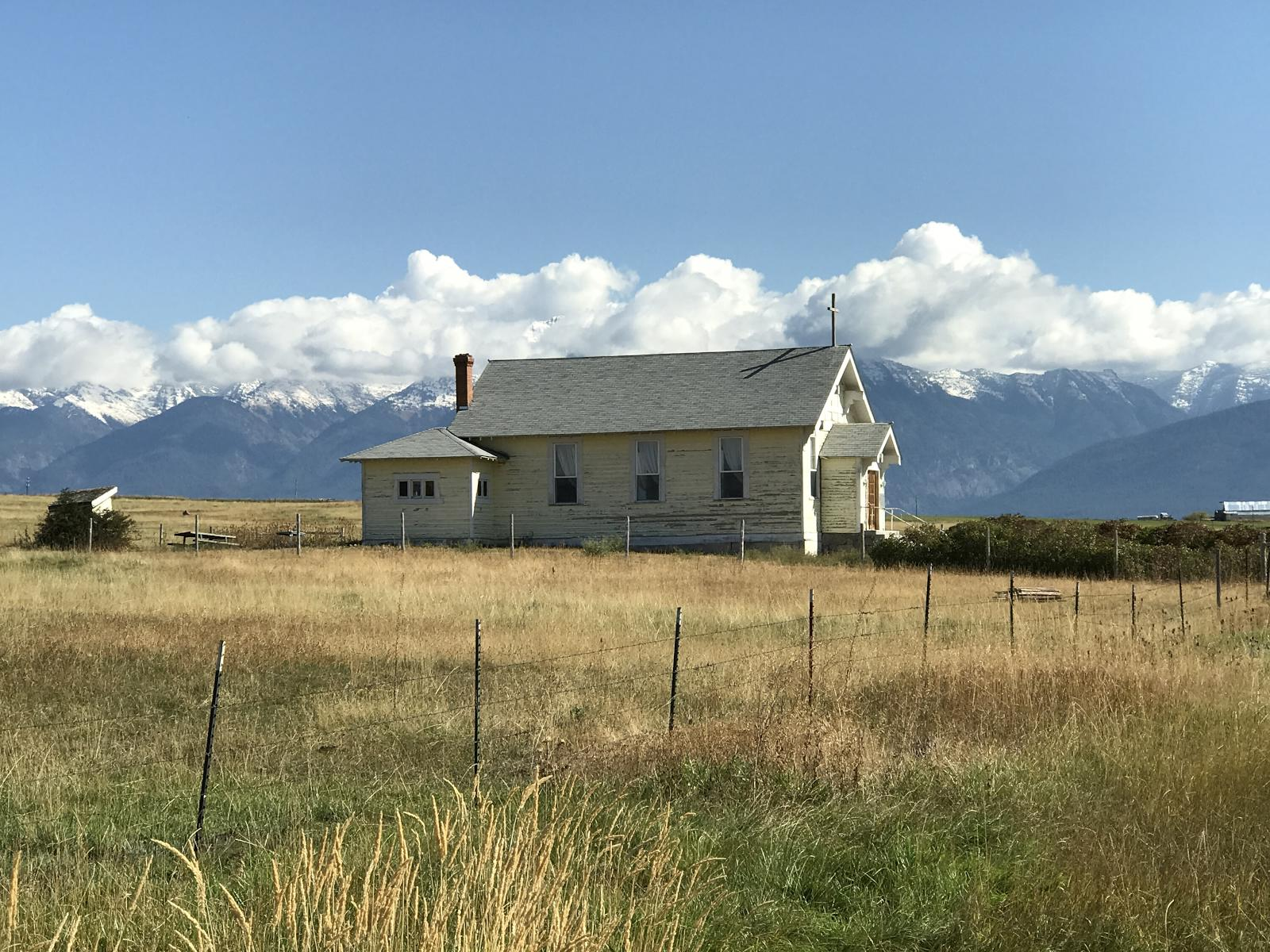

- Location within Montana Location within the United States
- Location: D'Aste Townsite, near Moiese, Montana
- Coordinates: 47°23′7″N 114°11′47″W
- Area: less than one acre
- Built: 1916
- Built by: McDonald, Tom; O'Maley, William
- Architectural style: Craftsman
- NRHP reference No.: 99000345
- Added to NRHP: March 18, 1999

The St. Joseph's Catholic Church is a site on the National Register of Historic Places located at the D'Aste Townsite. It was added to the Register on March 18, 1999.

It is a wood frame church built in 1916, with elements of Craftsman architecture. It is located between Charlo and Moiese, about 8 miles (13 km) northwest of St. Ignatius. The church stands by itself along a graveled county road.

== Gallery ==
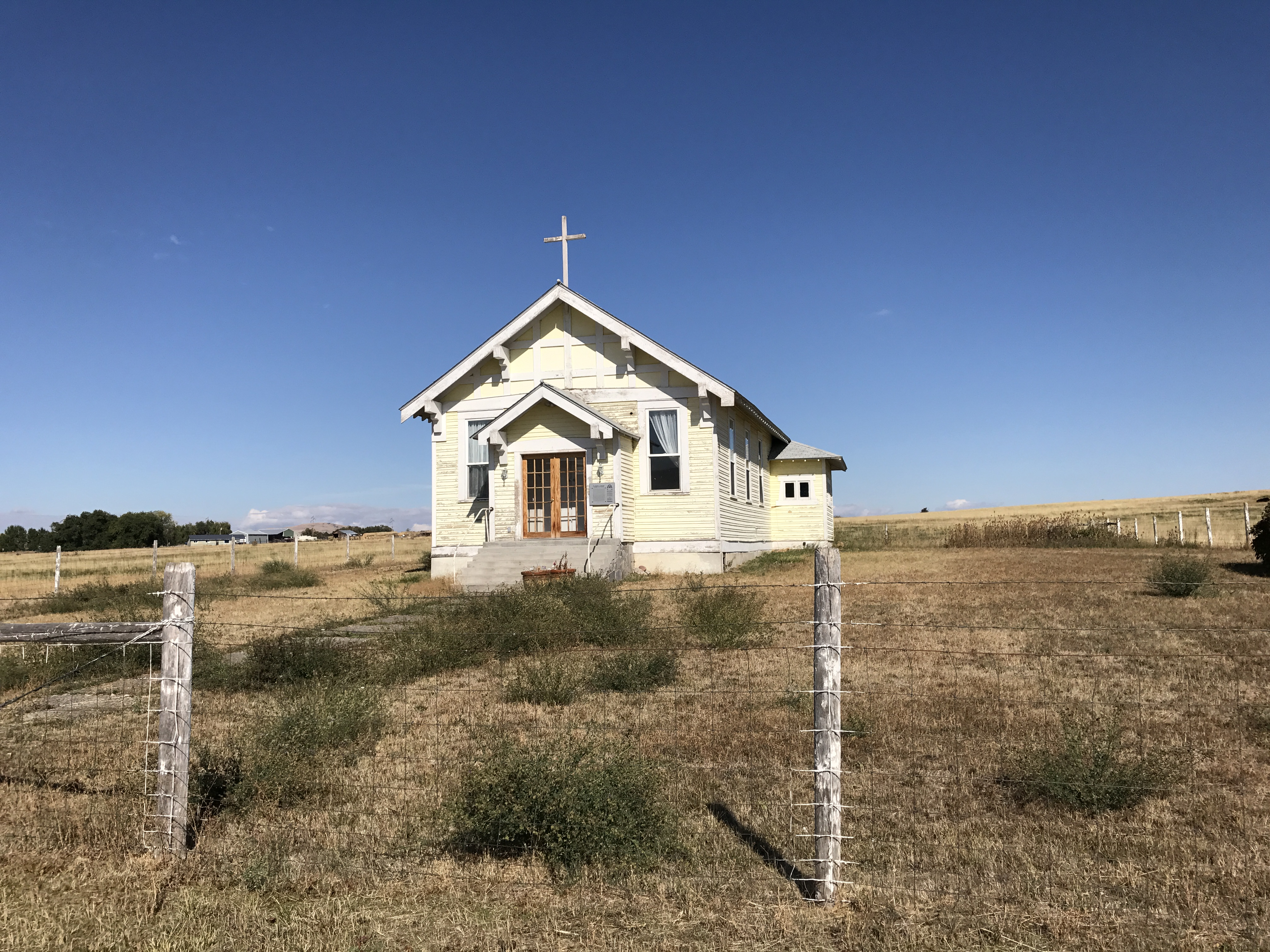

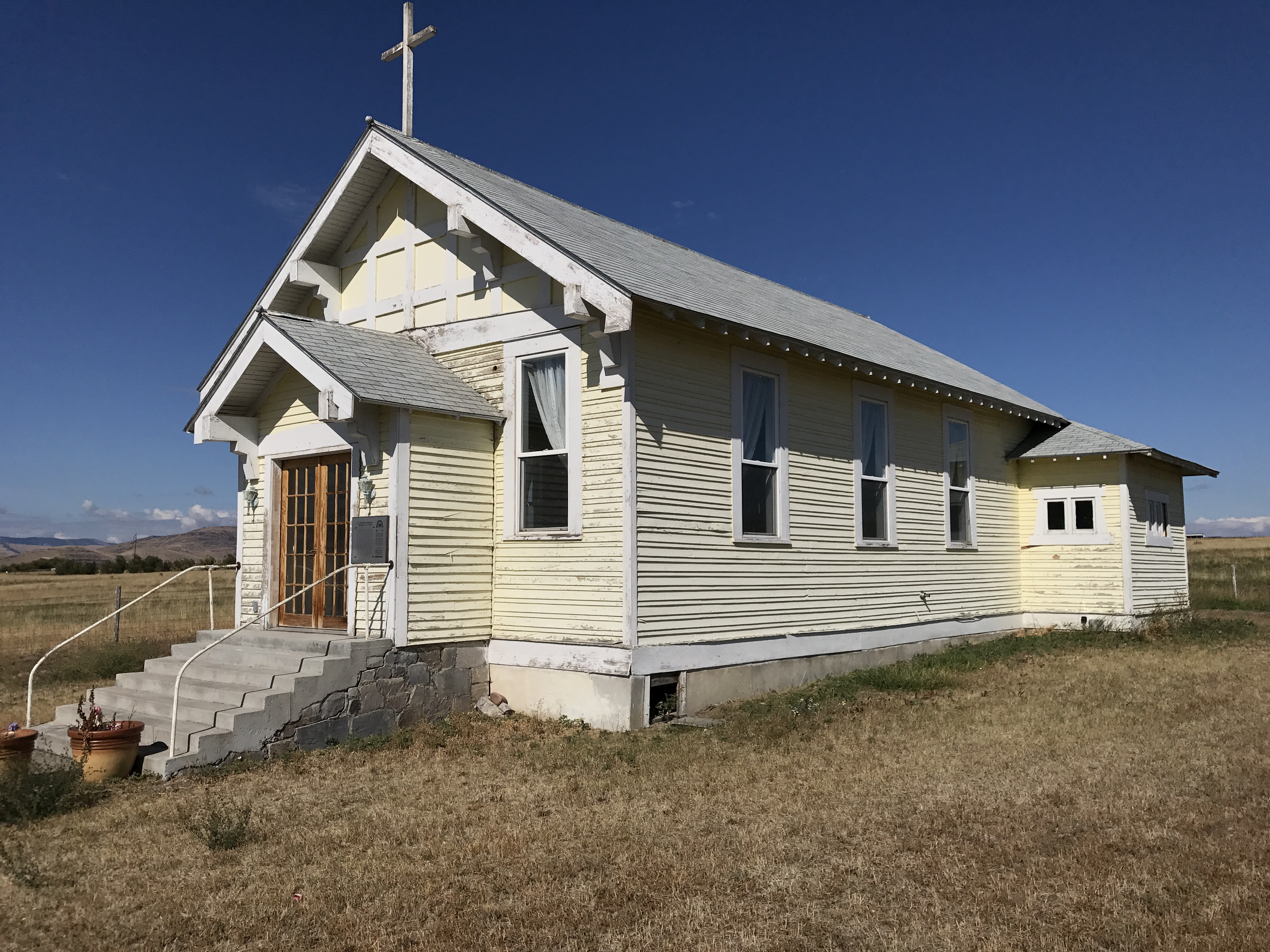

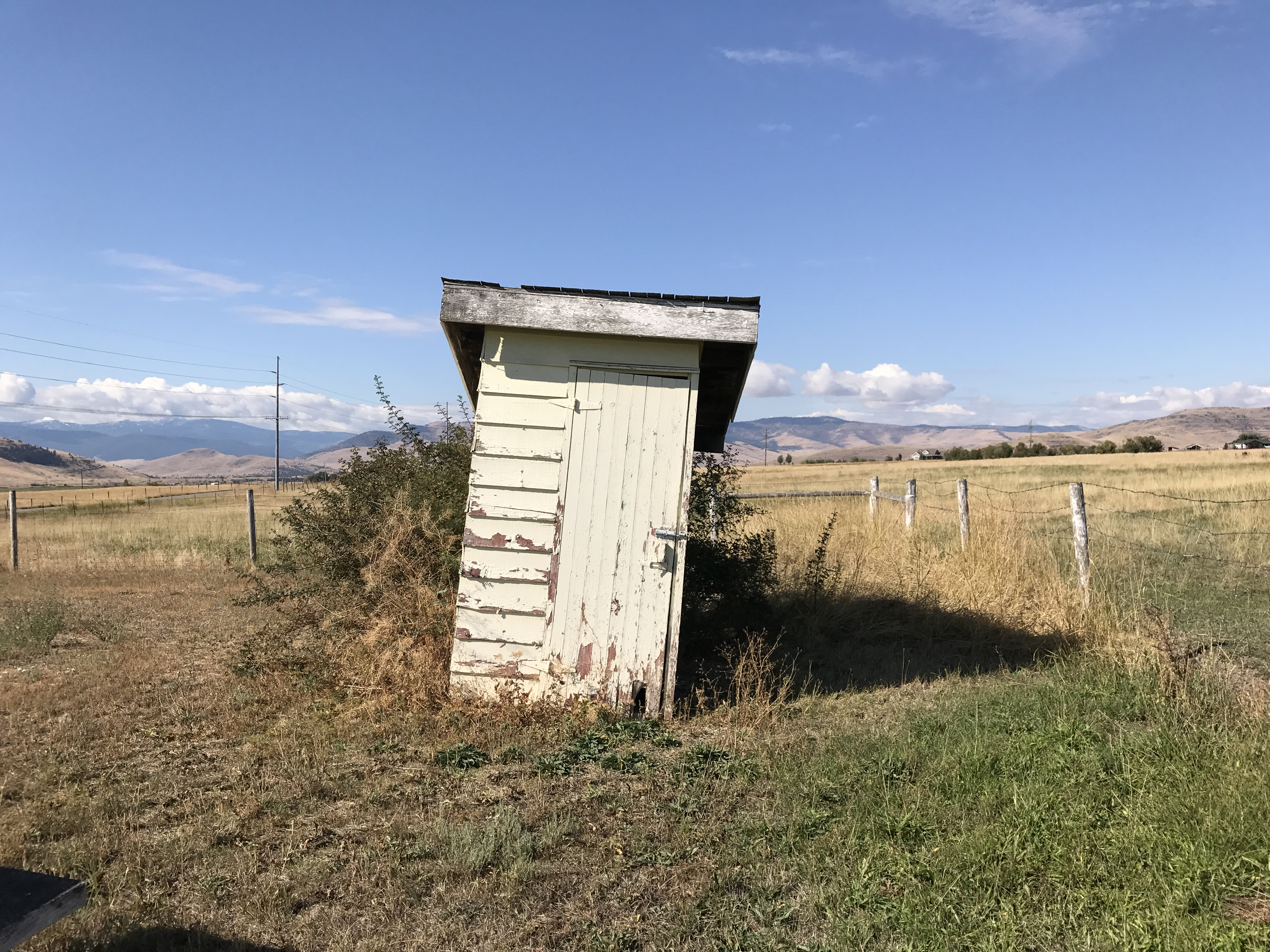

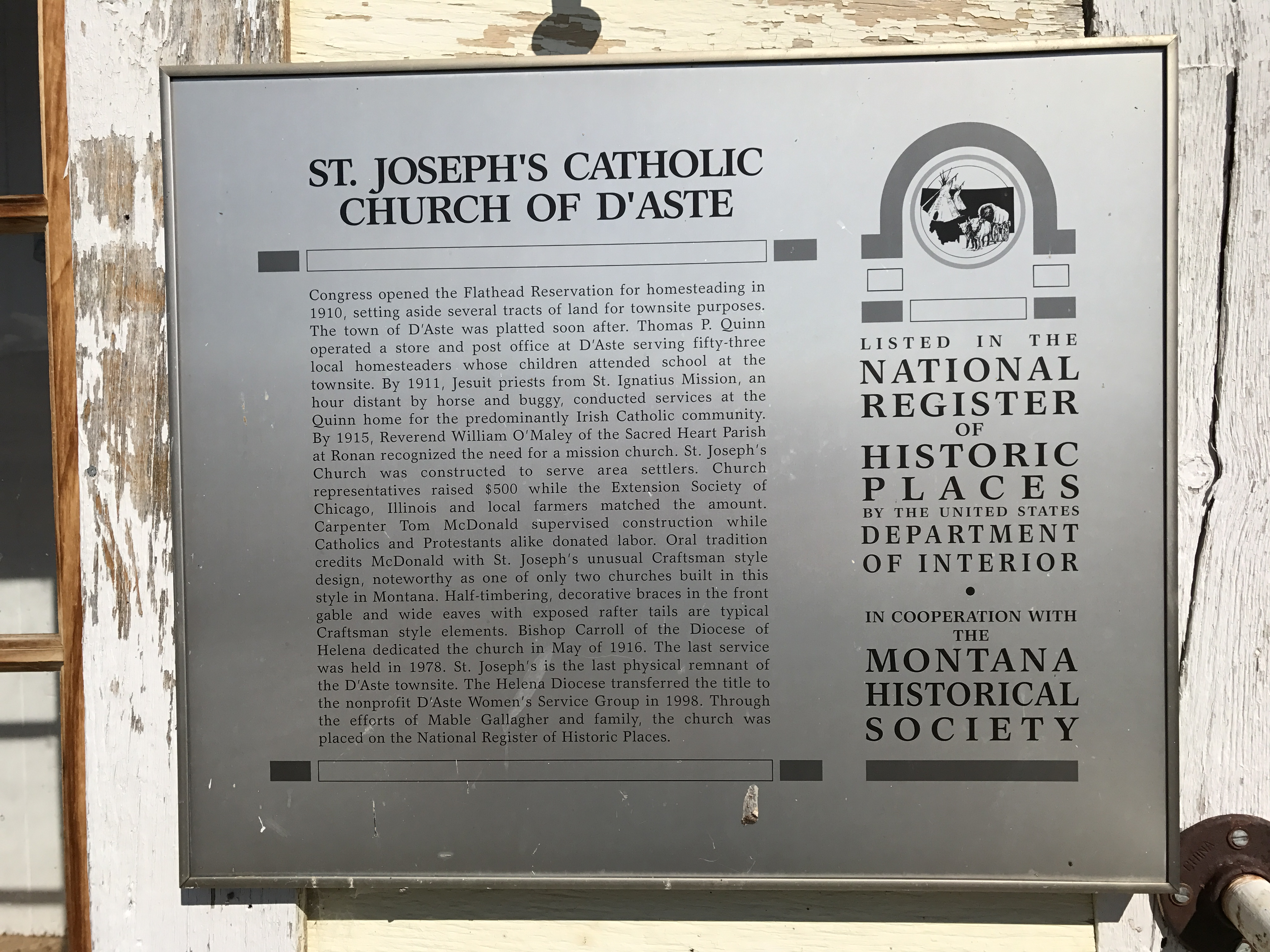
