= St. Peter's and St. Joseph's Catholic Churches =

Historic church in Wisconsin, United States

- U.S. National Register of Historic Places
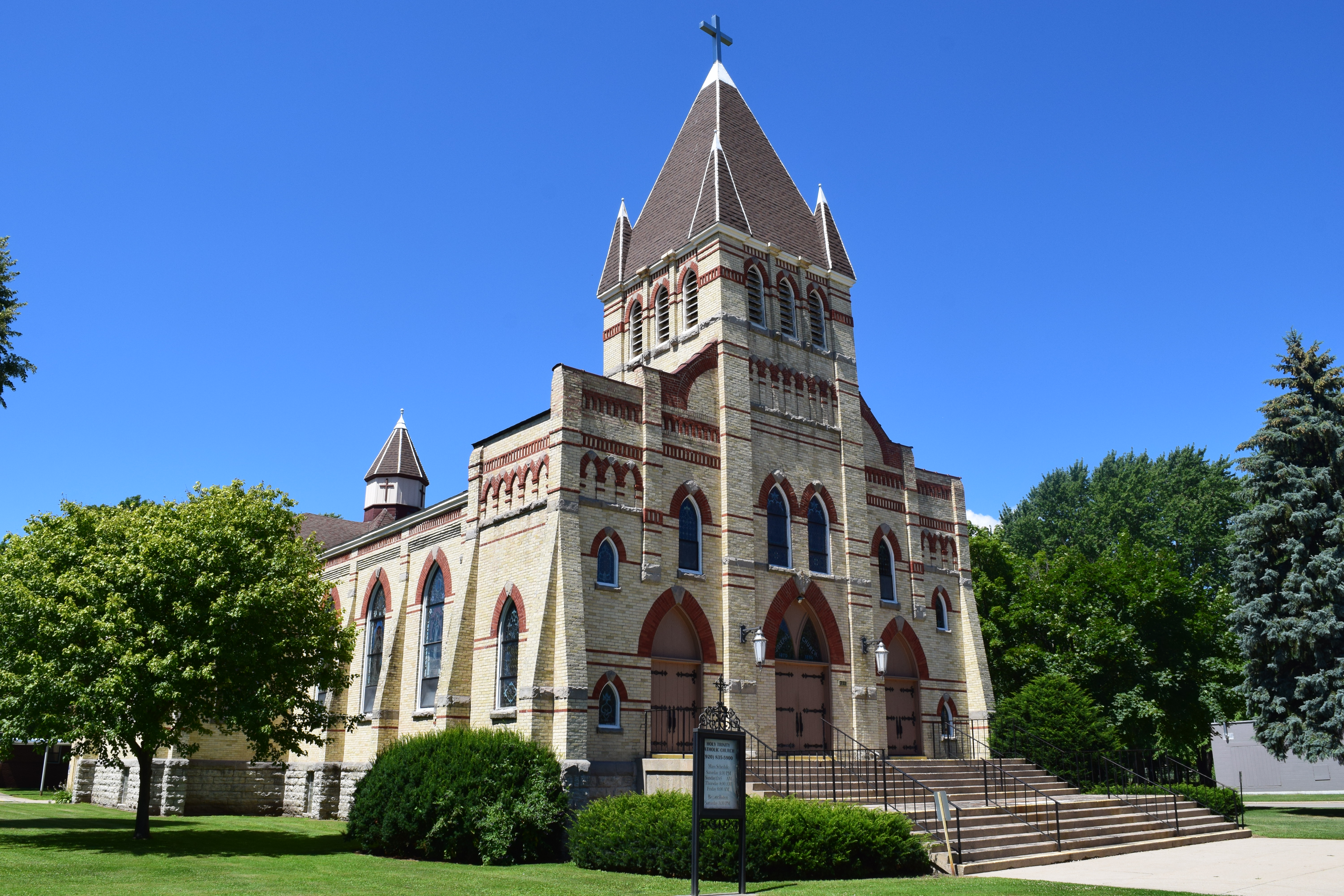
- St. Joseph's Catholic Church

- Location within Wisconsin Location within the United States
- Location: 516 Brazeau Ave. and 705 Park Ave., Oconto, Wisconsin
- Coordinates: 44°53′29″N 87°51′54″W
- Area: 0.5 acres (0.20 ha)
- Built: 1899
- Architect: Henry Foeller, Carlos C. Buck
- Architectural style: Gothic, Romanesque, Romanesque Revival
- NRHP reference No.: 80000172
- Added to NRHP: November 10, 1980

St. Peter's and St. Joseph's Catholic Churches are two historic Catholic churches in Oconto, Wisconsin, United States, both built in the 1890s. On November 10, 1980, they were added together to the National Register of Historic Places.

Oconto has a long history of French involvement, going back to the Jesuit missionary Allouez and fur-trading days. In 1857 the Catholic church established its first parish in Oconto, St Peter's, building a small wooden church. Initially the congregation was heavily French-American, and the French language was used in services.

But there were also non-French Catholics. Over time their numbers grew and they weren't satisfied with the French dominance at St Peter's. In 1869 100 families split off under Father Mathias Schwebach and formed St. Joseph's parish. Most of these families had German, Dutch or Irish roots. To hold the more diverse congregation together, services rotated between English, Dutch, German and Bohemian. Like St. Peter's, St. Joseph's initially built a small wooden church building.

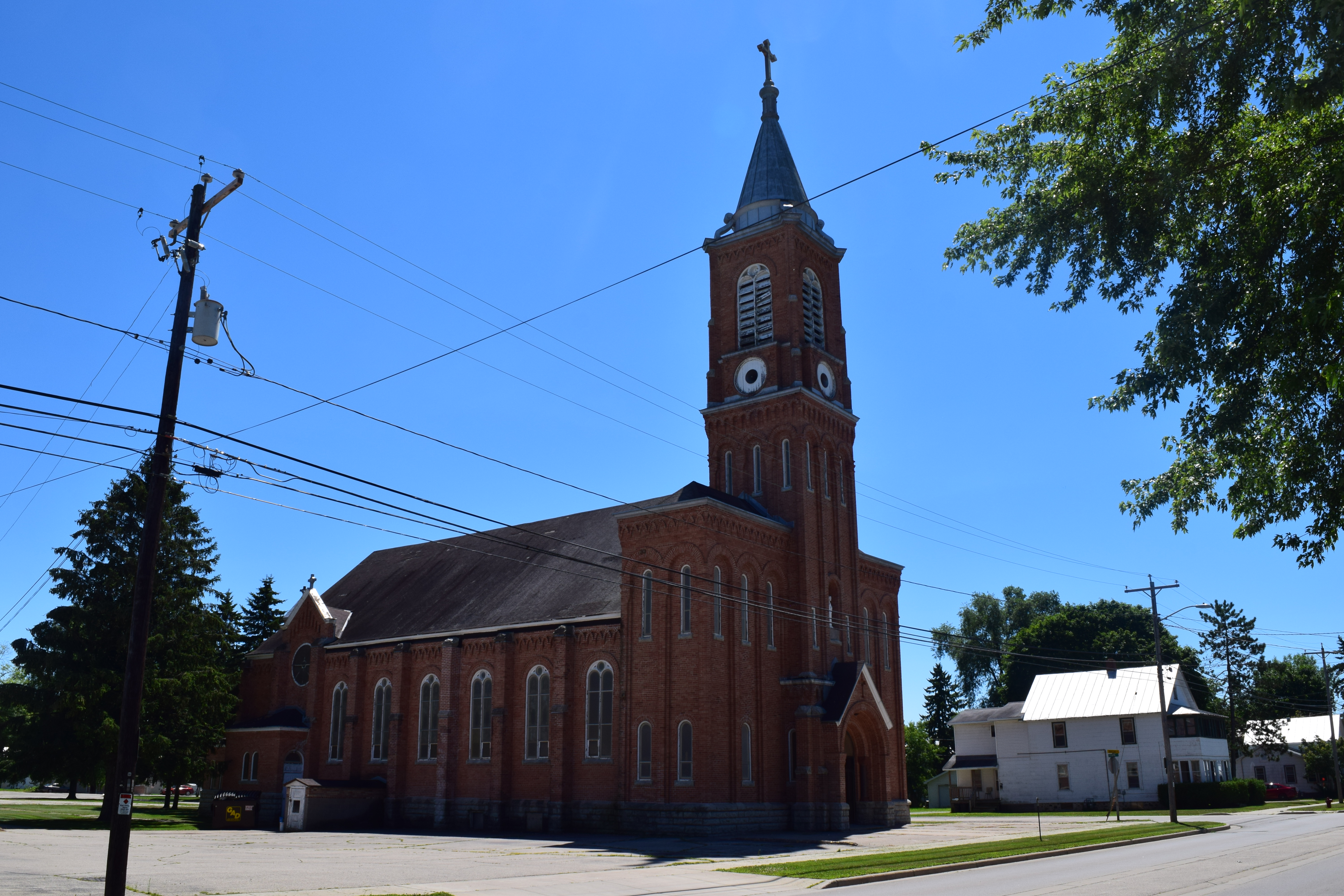
St. Peter's Catholic Church

But the parishes grew. In 1895 St. Joseph's replaced the wooden building with the brick church that stands today. Carlos Buck of Green Bay designed the new building in High Victorian Gothic style. From the rough stone foundation rise cream brick walls highlighted with red brick trim. Brick buttresses brace the walls. The main entrances on the front are three double doors. Above the central door is a stout tower braced by trompe-l'œil flying buttresses. The tower rises to a pyramidal spire with four smaller spires on the corners. The large central spire is topped with a cross. Behind the tower, an octagonal roof lantern perches where the gables cross. Inside, the ceiling is decorated with ornamental plaster work. When the church was built, various national groups donated stained glass windows depicting their favored saints.

In 1899, four years after St. Joseph's built, St. Peter's replaced their wooden church with a brick one. This one was designed by Henry Foeller of Green Bay, done in Romanesque Revival style. Typical of that style, the foundation is rusticated stone and the arches are round-topped. It is all in red brick, with arcades and emphasis on the vertical. Above the one main front entrance is a tall central tower, with a conical spire topped with a cross. The apse at the back of the building is lit by oculi windows.
