= San Giuseppe in Ospedale, Piacenza =

Church in Piacenza, Italy

Coordinates: 45.0562°N 9.6828°E

San Giuseppe in Ospedale is a Renaissance style, Roman Catholic parish church, located at via Campagna #68, in Piacenza, Region of Emilia Romagna, Italy.

== History ==
A church at this site had been present since the year 701, and been affiliated with the order of the Templars, and later the Knights of Malta. A hostel was attached, as was common for these orders, which likely served some of the pilgrims streaming to Rome and other religious sites South of here. In 1471 it was attached to the adjacent hospital. The church was noted for every Easter displaying the putatively miraculous relic of the Sacra Spina or Holy Thorn, putatively derived from the crown of thorns place on Christ, and brought to Piacenza in 1015. The church, once property of the Ospedale Grande, now is under the ownership of the Azienda Usl di Piacenza.

At the close of the 17th century, the church underwent a major reconstruction and refurbishment with works from Domenico Fontane, Provino Dalmazio Della Porta, and Michele Cremona. Robert De Longe painted a small canvas depicting St Joseph, St John the Baptist, and Jesus and in the choir, the Transit of St Joseph (Sanctified Ascension of Joseph). The nave ceiling was painted by Giuseppe Bernasconi.
