= St. Joseph Church, Minsk =

Former Roman Catholic church

Coordinates: 53°54′17″N 27°33′25″E

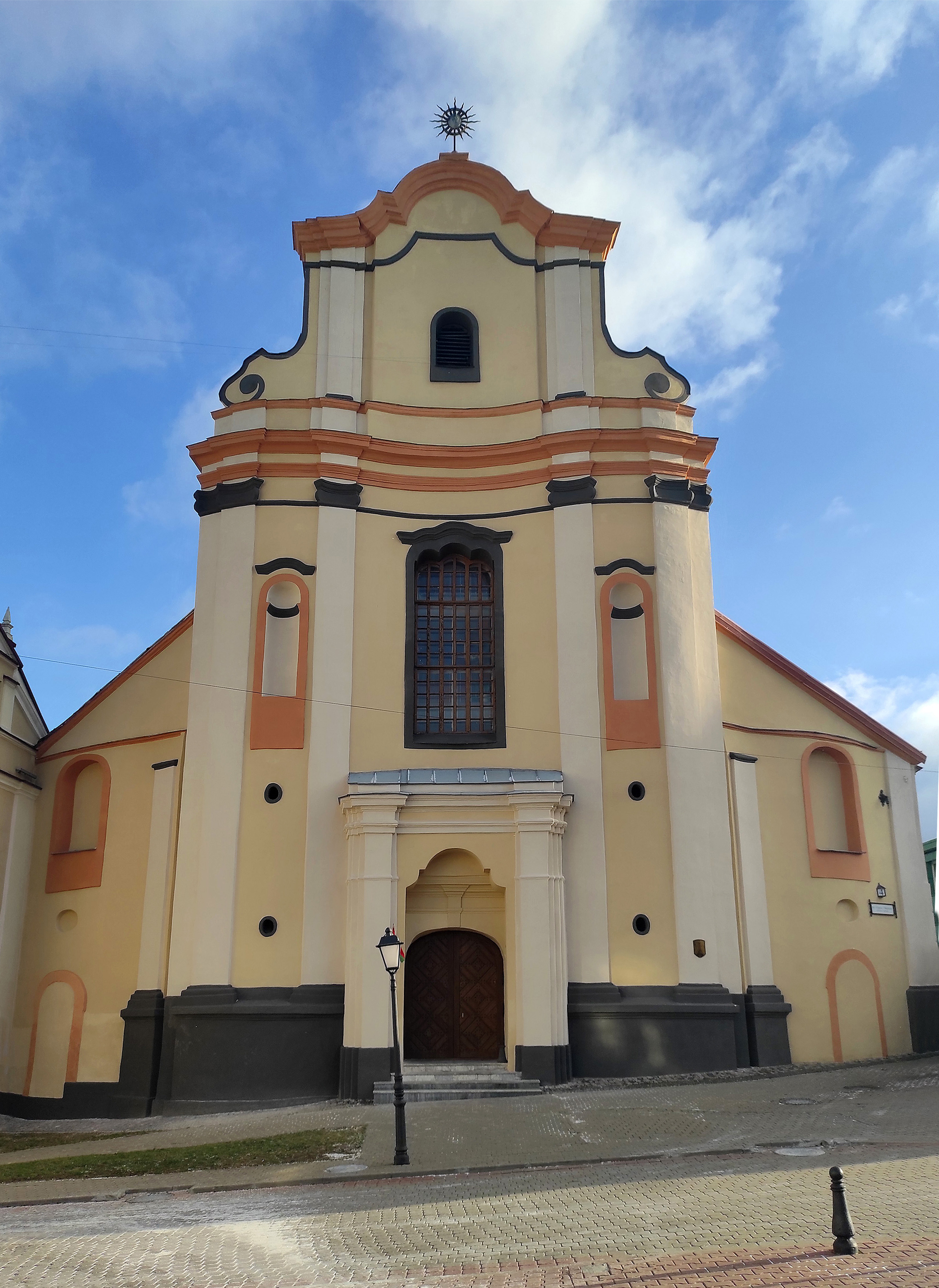
- St. Joseph Church

Religion
- Affiliation: Roman Catholic

Location
- Location: Minsk, Belarus
- Country: Belarus
- Interactive map of St. Joseph Church, Minsk

Architecture
- Type: Church
- Style: Baroque
- Completed: 1752

St. Joseph Church is a former Roman Catholic church in the Upper City (Minsk) district of Minsk, Belarus. The building, which is an example of the Baroque architecture style, was completed in 1752. The church was named after the monastery to which it belonged. It was closed in the 1860s and became an Eastern Orthodox Church. Since the late 19th century, it has been used to store archives.

== History ==
=== Construction and design ===
The Bernardines monastery was founded by Andej and Jan Kęsowski in 1624. The first monastery church was made from wood and constructed in the 1630s, but in 1644 it was destroyed by fire. In 1652 the new stone church was constructed and consecrated in the name of St. Joseph. The fires in 1656, 1740 and 1835 had severely damaged the monastery, however, it was reconstructed every time. The most significant restoration was made in 1752, then the buildings were redecorated in baroque style.

By the early XIX century the monastery occupied the whole block between the Small and Big Berdardinsky streets and Zybitskaya and Upper Markets squares. The ensemble included a church with a monks housing, a fratery, a school, a hospital, a stable, and a brewery, all enclosed by a high stone fence with several gates.

Nowadays the church looks like a three-aisled basilica. The highest central nave is covered with a gable roof with a protruding three-walled apse. The left and the right naves are shaped as chapels covered with cross-shaped vaults and lean-to roofs. The western facade is decorated with expressive pilasters, capitals, and volutes. Two sculptures, previously standing in the niches, are now lost. The front porch is topped with a massive triple window.

=== 19th—20th centuries ===
In the 1860s the monastery was closed and confiscated from the church as a punishment for participation in the January Uprising. Since 1872 it was used as an archive. In the early 20th century the gable roof was destroyed.

The latest restoration was completed in 1983. Nowadays the building serves as an archive of Belarusian art, literature, scientific, and technical documentation. Several monastery buildings were recently used as military and Prosecutor's offices. The archive currently holds more than 200 thousands items with such valuable ones as the post-war Minsk city planning designs. All modern restorations in Belarus use these archive documents as reference sources.

=== 21st century ===
By 2010 for more than 5 years the members of Christian community from Estonia, Russia, Ukraine, Lithuania, and Georgia tried to make the authorities return the building to the Church. The government, however, opened a hotel in the monastery wing.

In 2022, research and renovation work was carried out on the main façade of the church to restore its historical Baroque color scheme (architect R. Zabieła).
