= Ōmiya Street =

Street in Kyoto city, Japan

Ōmiya Street (大宮通 おおみやどおり Ōmiya dōri) is a major street running from north to south in the city of Kyoto, Japan. It extends about 10 km from Shikanoshimo Park in the north to Takeda Idebashi Street in the south, crossing the Kita-ku, Nakagyō-ku, Shimogyō-ku, Minami-ku and Fushimi-ku districts of Kyoto.

== History ==
Modern day Ōmiya Street corresponds to the Higashi Ōmiya Ōji of the Heian-kyō. After the decline of the Heian-kyō, as many other roads of the time it was extensively reduced, however it still remained by the time of the Kamakura period and beyond. Due to the construction of the Nijō Castle, the street was divided in two, in the section between Takeyamachi and Oshikoj streets.

== Present day ==
Nowadays Ōmiya Street is located between Horikawa Street (east) and Mibugawa Street (west). The section south of Shijō Street is currently a wide highway, however the northern part is a narrow local street, with many sections being one-way only. The section between Kamidachiuri and Motoseiganji streets crosses the hearth of the Nishijin district.

== Relevant landmarks along the street ==
Per the Encyclopedia of Kyoto:

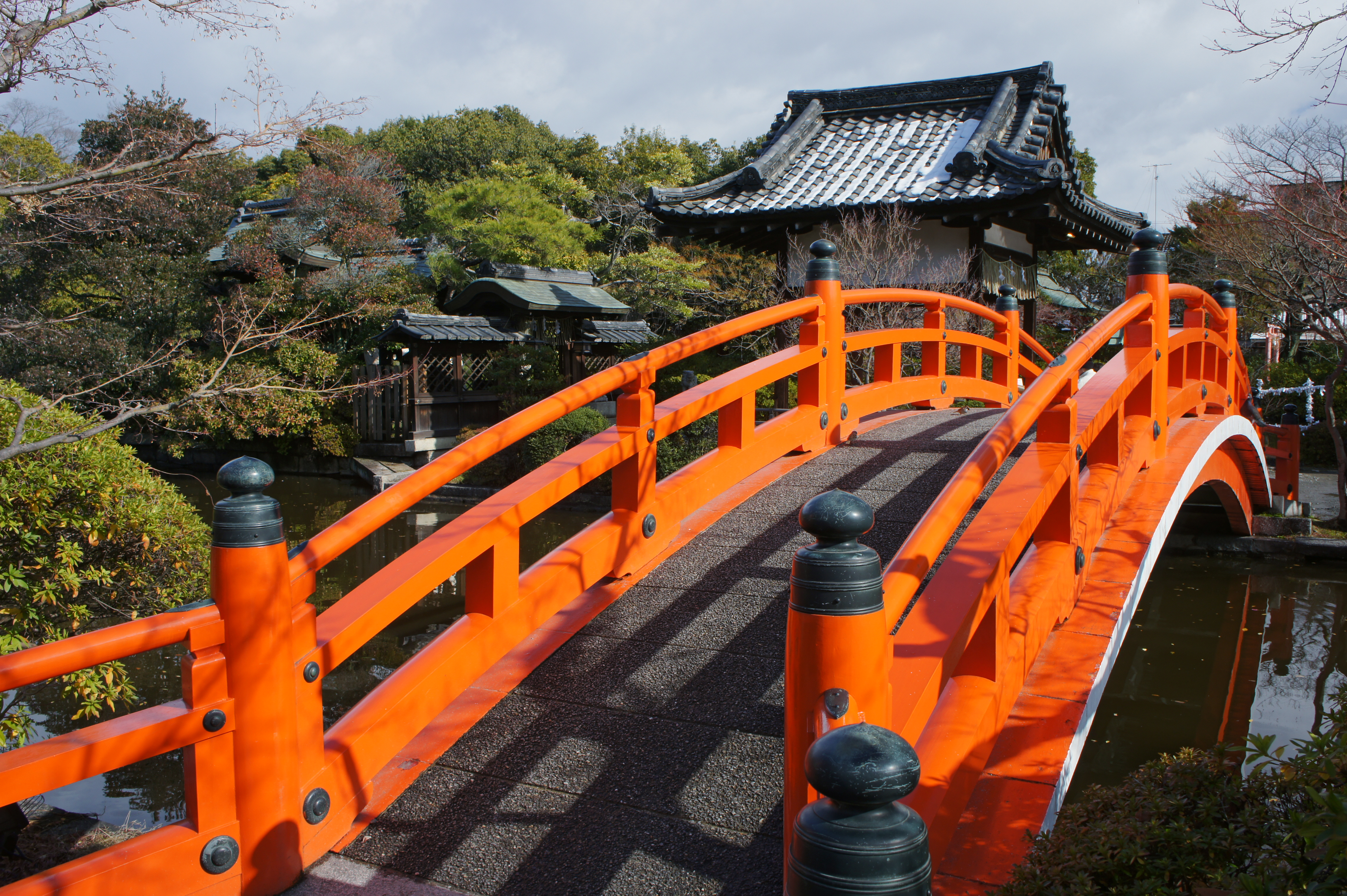
- Shinsenen.
  Nishijin
- Nijō Castle
- Shinsenen
- Ōmiya Station (Hankyu Kyoto Line)
- Shijō-Ōmiya Station (Randen)
- Nishi Hongan-ji
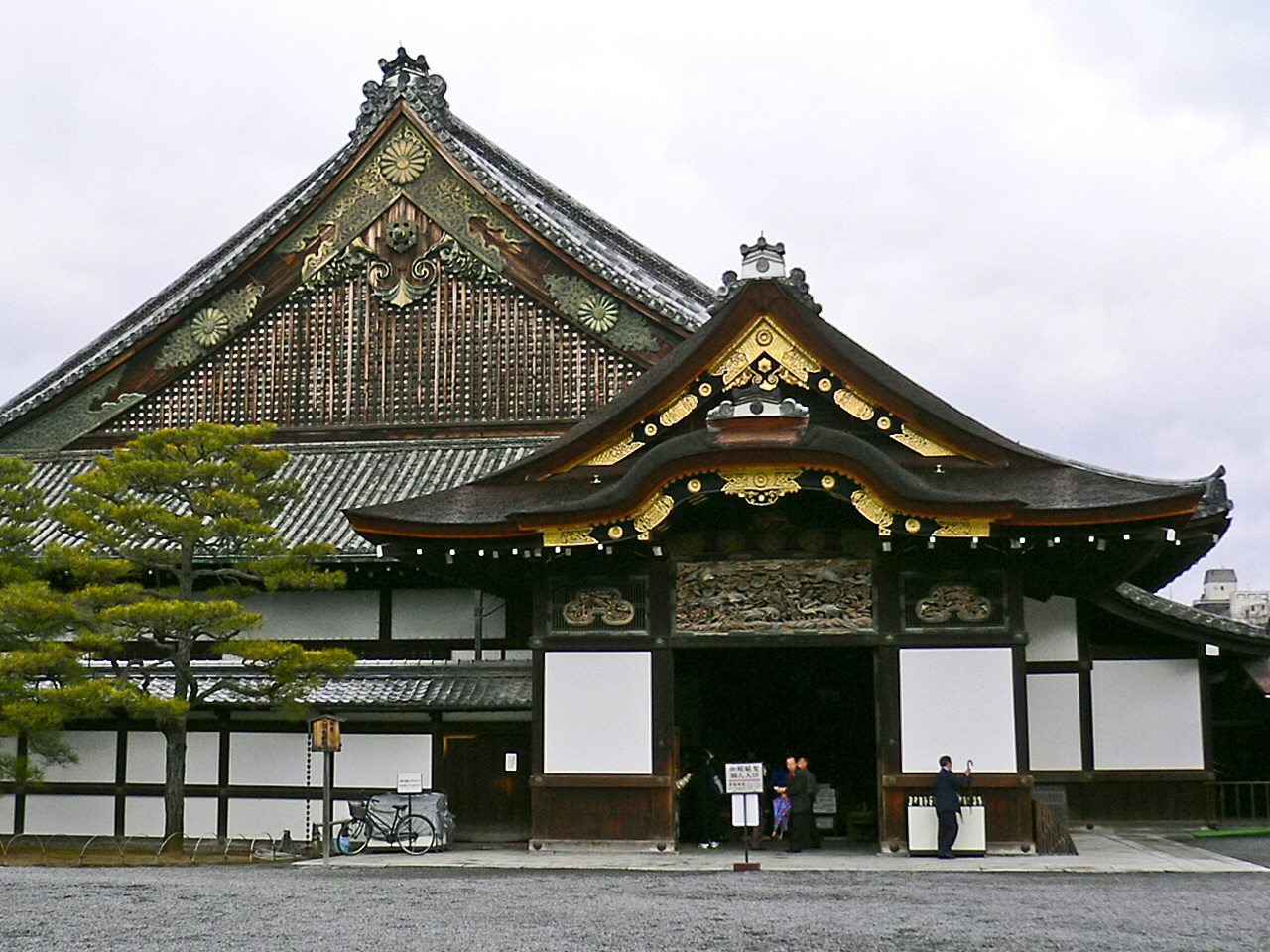
- Nijō Castle
  Ryukoku University
- Umekoji Park
- Tō-ji
