= List of Nysson species =

This is a list of 103 species in Nysson, a genus of hymenopterans in the family Bembicidae.

== Nysson species ==
- Nysson aequalis Vahl^{i c g b}
- Nysson alicantinus Mercet, 1909^{i c g}
- Nysson amurensis Nemkov, 1990^{i c g}
- Nysson argenteofasciatus Radoszkowski, 1877^{i c g}
- Nysson argenticus R. Bohart, 1968^{i c g}
- Nysson aridulus R. Bohart, 1968^{i c g}
- Nysson aurinotus Say, 1837^{i c g}
- Nysson bakeri R. Bohart, 1968^{i c g}
- Nysson barrei Radoszkowski, 1893^{i c g}
- Nysson basalis F. Smith, 1856^{c g}
- Nysson braunsii Handlirsch, 1900^{i c g}
- Nysson carinifrons Nemkov, 1995^{i c g}
- Nysson castaneus Radoszkowski, 1877^{i c g}
- Nysson castellanus Mercet, 1909^{i c g}
- Nysson chevrieri Kohl, 1879^{i c g}
- Nysson chiengmaiensis Tsuneki, 1963^{i c g}
- Nysson chumash Pate, 1940^{i c g}
- Nysson compactus Cresson, 1882^{i c g}
- Nysson costae Handlirsch, 1901^{i c g}
- Nysson daeckei Viereck, 1904^{i c g}
- Nysson decemmaculatus Spinola, 1807^{i c g}
- Nysson dimidiatus Jurine, 1807^{i c g}
- Nysson doriae Gribodo, 1884^{i c g}
- Nysson dubius Olivier, 1812^{i c g}
- Nysson dusmeti Mercet, 1909^{i c g}
- Nysson dutti R. Turner, 1917^{i c g}
- Nysson epeoliformis F. Smith, 1856^{i c g}
- Nysson erythropoda Cameron, 1890^{i c g}
- Nysson euphorbiae R. Bohart, 1968^{i c g}
- Nysson excavatus R. Turner, 1914^{i c g}
- Nysson fidelis Cresson, 1882^{i c g}
- Nysson fraternus Mercet, 1909^{i c g}
- Nysson freyigessneri ^{b}
- Nysson fulvipes A. Costa, 1859^{i c g}
- Nysson fulviventris Tsuneki, 1971^{i c g}
- Nysson gagates Bradley, 1920^{i c g}
- Nysson ganglbaueri Kohl, 1912^{i c g}
- Nysson gerstaeckeri Handlirsch, 1887^{i c g}
- Nysson grandissimus Radoszkowski, 1877^{i c g}
- Nysson guichardi de Beaumont, 1967^{i c g}
- Nysson handlirschi Schmiedeknecht, 1896^{i c g}
- Nysson harveyi de Beaumont, 1967^{i c g}
- Nysson hesperus R. Bohart, 1968^{i c g}
- Nysson hrubanti Balthasar, 1972^{i c g}
- Nysson humilis Handlirsch, 1895^{i c g}
- Nysson ibericus Handlirsch, 1895^{i c g}
- Nysson inornatus de Beaumont, 1967^{i c g}
- Nysson intermedius Viereck, 1908^{i c g}
- Nysson interruptus (Fabricius, 1798)^{i c g}
- Nysson kazenasi Nemkov and Gayubo, 2003^{i c g}
- Nysson kolazyi Handlirsch, 1887^{i c g}
- Nysson konowi Mercet, 1909^{i c g}
- Nysson laevis Pulawski, 1964^{i c g}
- Nysson lapillus de Beaumont, 1965^{i c g}
- Nysson lateralis Packard, 1867^{i c g b}
- Nysson laufferi Mercet, 1904^{i c g}
- Nysson maculosus (Gmelin, 1790)^{i c g}
- Nysson maderae (R. Bohart, 1968)^{i c g}
- Nysson miegi Mercet, 1909^{i c g}
- Nysson militaris Gerstäcker, 1867^{i c g}
- Nysson mimulus Valkeila, 1964^{i c g}
- Nysson minutus Arnold, 1929^{i c g}
- Nysson monachus Mercet, 1909^{i c g}
- Nysson nanus Handlirsch, 1898^{i c g}
- Nysson neorusticus R. Bohart, 1968^{i c g}
- Nysson niger Chevrier, 1868^{i c g}
- Nysson ohli (Schmid-Egger, 2011)^{i c g}
- Nysson paralias Standfuss, 2010^{i c g}
- Nysson parietalis Mercet, 1909^{i c g}
- Nysson plagiatus Günther, 1861^{i c g b}
- Nysson pratensis Mercet, 1909^{i c g}
- Nysson pumilus Cresson, 1882^{i c g}
- Nysson pusillus de Beaumont, 1953^{i c g}
- Nysson quadricolor Arnold, 1951^{i c g}
- Nysson quadriguttatus Spinola, 1807^{i c g}
- Nysson recticornis Bradley, 1920^{i c g b}
- Nysson roubali Zavadil, 1937^{i c g}
- Nysson rufiventris Cresson, 1882^{i c g}
- Nysson rufoflavus R. Bohart, 1968^{i c g}
- Nysson rufoniger R. Turner, 1912^{i c g}
- Nysson rufopictus F. Smith, 1856^{i c g}
- Nysson rufus Handlirsch, 1895^{i c g}
- Nysson rugosus Cameron, 1890^{i c g}
- Nysson ruspolii von Schulthess, 1893^{i c g}
- Nysson rusticus Cresson, 1882^{i c g b}
- Nysson ruthenicus Birula, 1912^{i c g}
- Nysson schlingeri R. Bohart, 1968^{i c g}
- Nysson schmiedeknechtii Handlirsch, 1900^{i c g}
- Nysson semenovi (Nemkov, 2001)^{i c g}
- Nysson sexguttatus Gussakovskij, 1952^{i c g}
- Nysson simplicicornis W. Fox, 1896^{i c g}
- Nysson spinosus (J. Forster, 1771)^{i c g}
- Nysson subtilis W. Fox, 1896^{i c g b}
- Nysson timberlakei R. Bohart, 1968^{i c g}
- Nysson trichopygus de Beaumont, 1967^{i c g}
- Nysson trichrus (Mickel, 1916)^{i c g}
- Nysson tridens Gerstäcker, 1867^{i c g}
- Nysson trimaculatus (Rossi, 1790)^{i c g}
- Nysson tristis Cresson, 1882^{i c g b}
- Nysson uniformis Pérez, 1895^{i c g}
- Nysson varelai Mercet, 1909^{i c g}
- Nysson variabilis Chevrier, 1867^{i c g}
- Nysson willowmorensis Brauns, 1911^{i c g}

Data sources: i = ITIS, c = Catalogue of Life, g = GBIF, b = Bugguide.net
