= Henry W. Brinkman =

American architect (1881–1949)

- Born: April 30, 1881; Westphalia
- Died: 1949 (aged 67–68)
- Education: Kansas State College (Graduated 1907)
- Occupation: Architect
- Years active: 1910–1947
- Partner: Stanley Hagen (1925–1948)
- Practice: Brinkman & Hagen
- Buildings: St. Joseph Catholic Church (Damar, KS)

Seven Dolors CC.jpg Seven Dolors Catholic Church, Manhattan, Kansas, U.S. (2009)

Henry W. Brinkman(1881–1949) was an American architect, from Emporia, Kansas, who practiced from 1910 to 1947.

== Early life and education ==
Henry Brinkman was born in Westphalia (in Europe) on April 30, 1881. After immigrating to America, his family settled in Olpe, Kansas.

He graduated from Kansas State College's school of architecture in Manhattan, Kansas, in 1907.

== Career ==
Brinkman went into partnership with Stanley Hagen in 1925, which continued until Brinkman's retirement in 1948.

His Romanesque-style St. Joseph Catholic Church in Damar, Kansas, was built in 1912. Several of his works survive and are listed on the U.S. National Register of Historic Places.

=== Notable works ===
Works (attribution) include:

- Cathedral of the Nativity of the Blessed Virgin Mary, 204 South Cedar Street, Grand Island, Nebraska, NRHP-listed
- Hoisington High School, 218 East 7th Street, Hoisington, Kansas, NRHP-listed
- St. Joseph Catholic Church, built 1912, 105 North Oak Street, Damar, Kansas, NRHP-listed
- St. Ludger Catholic Church, junction of MO K and High Street, Montrose, Missouri, NRHP-listed
- Seven Dolors Catholic Church, northeast of the junction of Juliette and Pierre Streets, Manhattan, Kansas, NRHP-listed
- St. Ann Catholic Church, Olmitz, Kansas, built 1913

== Death ==
Brinkman died on December 7, 1949.

== See also ==
- List of American architects
- List of people from Kansas
- List of Kansas State University people
