= Cresson =

Cresson is the French word for watercress. It may refer to:

Places

- Battle of Cresson, a small battle fought on May 1, 1187, in what now is Israel, near Nazareth
- Cresson, Kansas, a United States ghost town
- Cresson, Pennsylvania, a United States borough
- Cressona, Pennsylvania, a United States borough
- Cresson Township, Pennsylvania, a U.S. township
- Cresson, Texas, a United States city

People

- Cresson Kearny, U.S. survival guide writer

Other uses

- Cresson (wasp), a wasp in the family Crabronidae

== See also ==
- Cressonsacq, a village and commune in France
- Montcresson, a commune in France
- Saint-Martin-de-Bienfaite-la-Cressonnière, a commune in France
- Vaucresson, a commune in France
