= Zurich, Kansas =

City in Rooks County, Kansas

- City
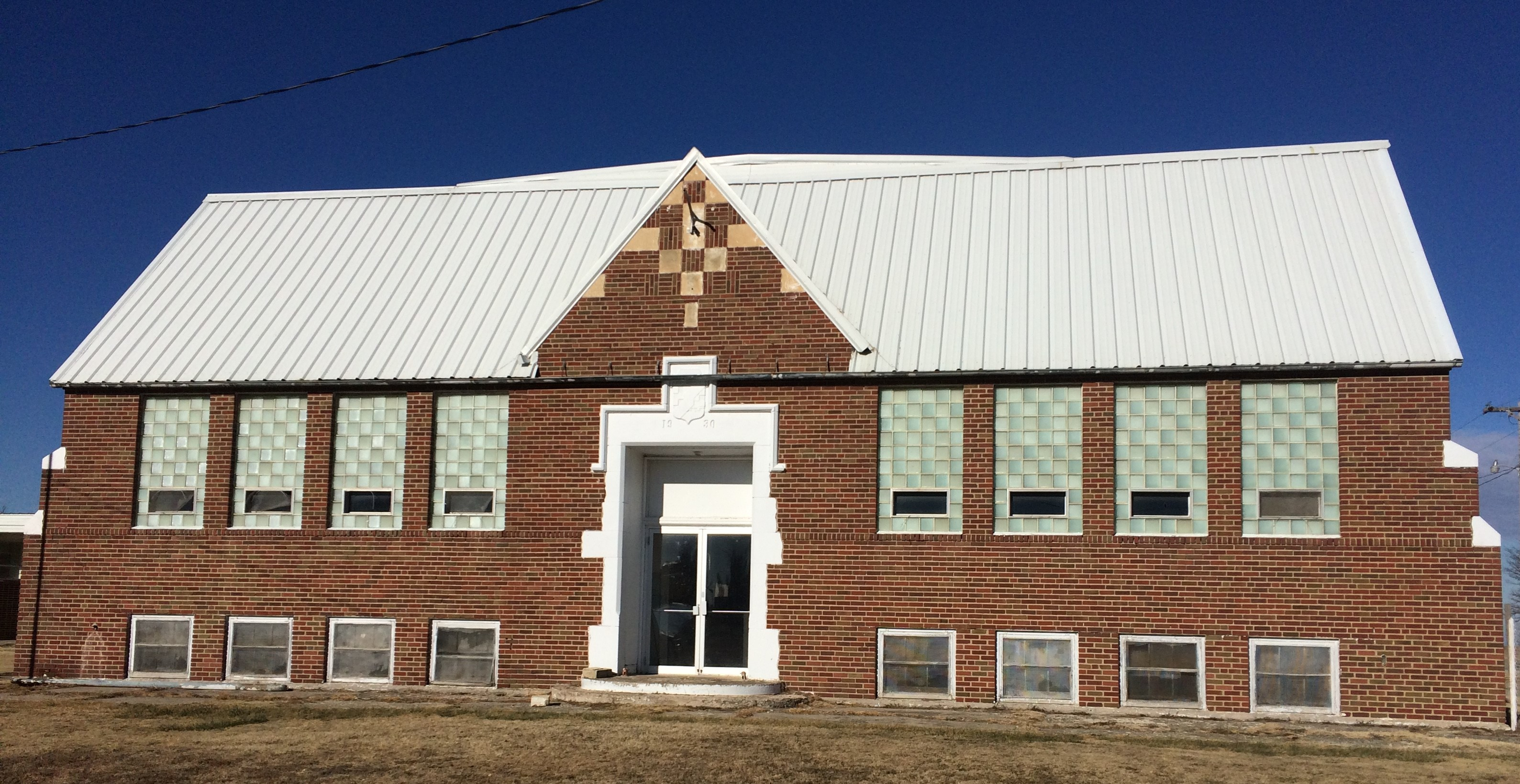
- Zurich Community Center est 1930

- Location within Rooks County and Kansas

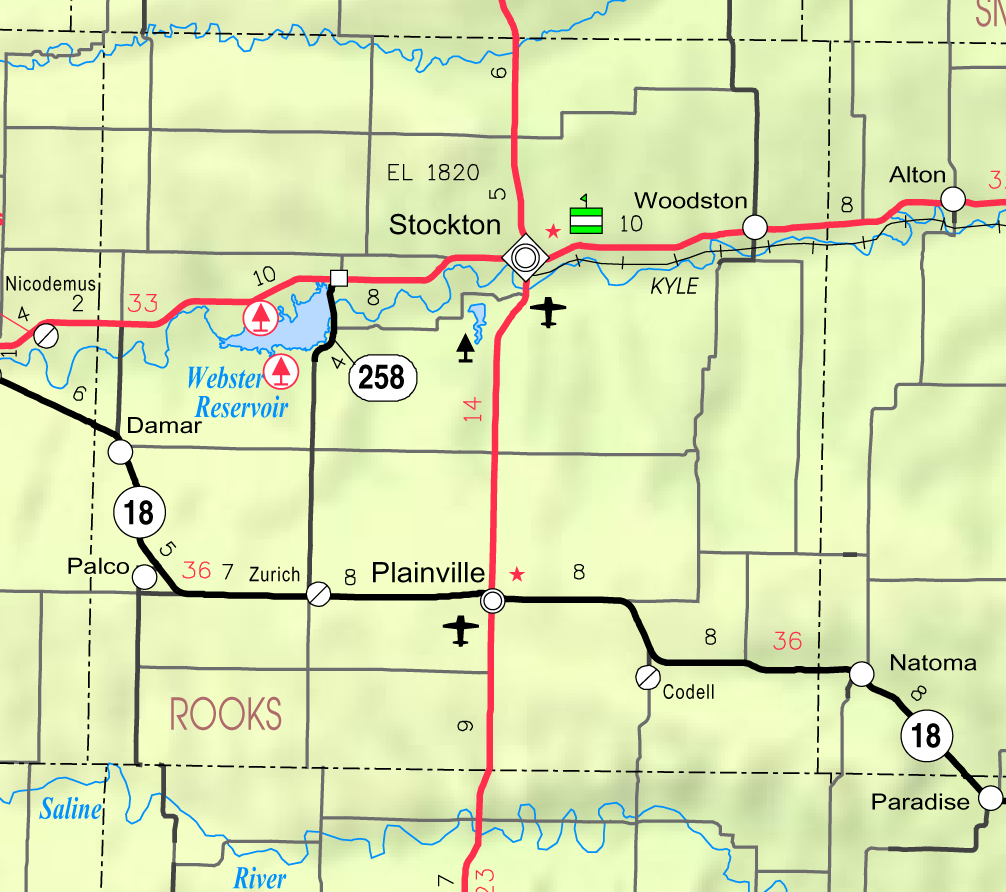
- KDOT map of Rooks County (legend)
- Coordinates: 39°13′56″N 99°26′05″W
- Country: United States
- State: Kansas
- County: Rooks
- Founded: 1870s
- Incorporated: 1946
- Named for: Zurich, Switzerland

Area
  - Total: 0.18 sq mi (0.47 km^{2})
  - Land: 0.18 sq mi (0.47 km^{2})
  - Water: 0 sq mi (0.00 km^{2})
- Elevation: 2,215 ft (675 m)

Population (2020)
  - Total: 89
  - Density: 490/sq mi (190/km^{2})
- Time zone: UTC-6 (CST)
  - Summer (DST): UTC-5 (CDT)
- ZIP Code: 67663
- Area code: 785
- FIPS code: 20-81025
- GNIS ID: 2397404

Zurich is a city in Rooks County, Kansas, United States. As of the 2020 census, the population of the city was 89.

== History ==
Zurich was established on the plains of northwestern Kansas in the late 1870s. In 1880, John and Armenda Webb, who were born in Zurich (Switzerland) filed a US postal service application using the name of their birthplace, Zurich. The application was granted and Armenda Webb became the first postmistress of Zurich, operating the post office from her home.

Union Pacific Railroad extended a line through western Kansas in 1888. The line was routed just south of Zurich where a train depot was established.

In 1918, fire destroyed most of the Zurich business district when the west side of Main Street caught fire. Three years later, fire claimed the post office, creamery and a store at the north end of Main Street.

"Zurich It's Never Idle" was a popular emblem sold in Zurich in the 1920s. The emblem was proudly displayed on car radiators at the time. The slogan was adopted for the 1980 Zurich centennial celebration.

The post office in Zurich was discontinued in 1996.

== Geography ==
According to the United States Census Bureau, the city has a total area of 0.17 square miles (0.44 km^{2}), all land.

== Demographics ==
Historical population
Census	Pop.	Note	%±
1950	186		—
1960	244		31.2%
1970	189		−22.5%
1980	185		−2.1%
1990	151		−18.4%
2000	126		−16.6%
2010	99		−21.4%
2020	89		−10.1%
U.S. Decennial Census

=== 2010 census ===
As of the census of 2010, there were 99 people, 46 households, and 24 families residing in the city. The population density was 582.4 inhabitants per square mile (224.9/km^{2}). There were 67 housing units at an average density of 394.1 per square mile (152.2/km^{2}). The racial makeup of the city was 99.0% White and 1.0% from two or more races.

There were 46 households, of which 19.6% had children under the age of 18 living with them, 41.3% were married couples living together, 6.5% had a female householder with no husband present, 4.3% had a male householder with no wife present, and 47.8% were non-families. 39.1% of all households were made up of individuals, and 8.7% had someone living alone who was 65 years of age or older. The average household size was 2.15 and the average family size was 3.00.

The median age in the city was 42.8 years. 20.2% of residents were under the age of 18; 13.2% were between the ages of 18 and 24; 19.3% were from 25 to 44; 33.4% were from 45 to 64; and 14.1% were 65 years of age or older. The gender makeup of the city was 48.5% male and 51.5% female.

=== 2000 census ===
As of the census of 2000, there were 126 people, 51 households, and 37 families residing in the city. The population density was 731.6 inhabitants per square mile (282.5/km^{2}). There were 60 housing units at an average density of 348.4 per square mile (134.5/km^{2}). The racial makeup of the city was 99.21% White and 0.79% African American.

There were 51 households, out of which 27.5% had children under the age of 18 living with them, 64.7% were married couples living together, 7.8% had a female householder with no husband present, and 25.5% were non-families. 21.6% of all households were made up of individuals, and 7.8% had someone living alone who was 65 years of age or older. The average household size was 2.47 and the average family size was 2.89.

In the city, the population was spread out, with 25.4% under the age of 18, 6.3% from 18 to 24, 26.2% from 25 to 44, 23.0% from 45 to 64, and 19.0% who were 65 years of age or older. The median age was 40 years. For every 100 females, there were 90.9 males. For every 100 females age 18 and over, there were 88.0 males.

The median income for a household in the city was $32,000, and the median income for a family was $33,125. Males had a median income of $25,313 versus $14,107 for females. The per capita income for the city was $12,235. There were 5.7% of families and 4.7% of the population living below the poverty line, including no under eighteens and 11.1% of those over 64.

== Education ==
The community is served by Palco USD 269 public school district. It has two schools: Damar Elementary School is located in Damar, Palco Jr-Sr High School is located in Palco.

Zurich High School was consolidated to Palco High School in 1955. Zurich grade school closed in 1977. The Zurich grade school mascot was Wildcats.
