= Epinysson tuberculatus =

Scientific classification
- Domain: Eukaryota
- Kingdom: Animalia
- Phylum: Arthropoda
- Class: Insecta
- Order: Hymenoptera
- Family: Bembicidae
- Tribe: Nyssonini
- Genus: Epinysson
- Species: E. tuberculatus

Binomial name
- Epinysson tuberculatus (Handlirsch, 1887)

Synonyms
- Epinysson guatemalensis (Rohwer, 1914); Epinysson guatemalensis hoplisivora (Rohwer, 1923); Nysson guatemalensis Rohwer, 1914; Nysson hoplisivora Rohwer, 1923; Nysson tuberculatus Handlirsch, 1887

Species of wasp

Epinysson tuberculatus is a species of wasp in the family Bembicidae. It is found in Central America and North America.
