= Nysson subtilis =

Scientific classification
- Domain: Eukaryota
- Kingdom: Animalia
- Phylum: Arthropoda
- Class: Insecta
- Order: Hymenoptera
- Family: Bembicidae
- Tribe: Nyssonini
- Genus: Nysson
- Species: N. subtilis

Binomial name
- Nysson subtilis W. Fox, 1896

Species of wasp

Nysson subtilis is a species of wasp in the family Bembicidae. It is found in North America. It can be easily distinguished from other wasps in the same genus by its entirely black front.
