= Foxia navajo =

Scientific classification
- Domain: Eukaryota
- Kingdom: Animalia
- Phylum: Arthropoda
- Class: Insecta
- Order: Hymenoptera
- Family: Bembicidae
- Tribe: Nyssonini
- Genus: Foxia
- Species: F. navajo

Binomial name
- Foxia navajo Pate, 1938

Species of wasp

Foxia navajo is a species of wasp in the family Bembicidae. It is found in North America.
