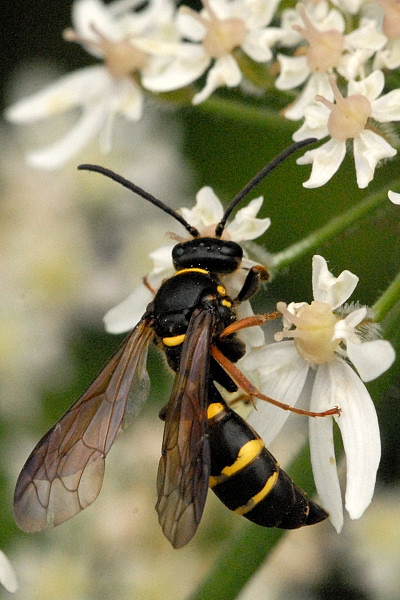
- Argogorytes mystaceus

Scientific classification
- Kingdom: Animalia
- Phylum: Arthropoda
- Class: Insecta
- Order: Hymenoptera
- Family: Bembicidae
- Subfamily: Bembicinae
- Tribe: Bembicini
- Subtribe: Exeirina
- Genus: Argogorytes; Ashmead, 1899

Type species
- Argogorytes carbonarius (Smith, 1856)

Synonyms
- Malaygorytes Nemkov

= Argogorytes =

Genus of wasps

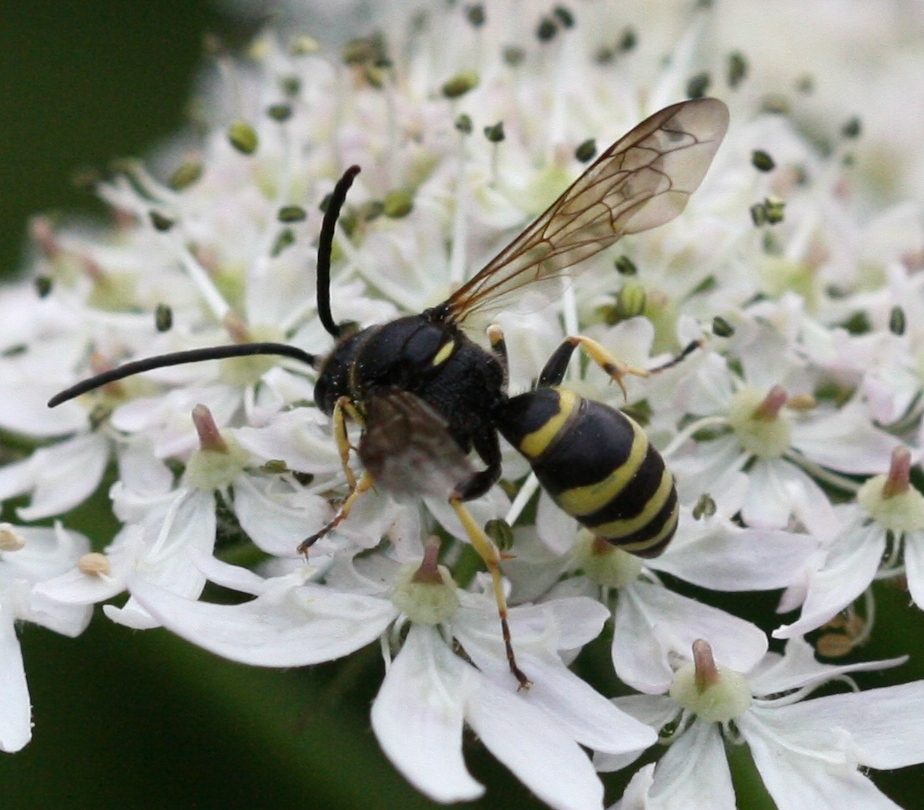
Argogorytes fargeii

Argogorytes is a genus of wasps in the family Bembicidae, with 31 known species. The genus is found around the world, with the exception of tropical Africa and Antarctica.

== Worldwide species ==
These 31 species belong to the genus Argogorytes:

- Argogorytes areatus (Taschenberg, 1875)^{i c g}
- Argogorytes basalis (F. Smith, 1860)^{i c g}
- Argogorytes bismarckianus Tsuneki, 1982^{i c g}
- Argogorytes caerulescens (R. Turner, 1914)^{i c g}
- Argogorytes carbonarius (F. Smith, 1856)^{i c g}
- Argogorytes clypealis R. Bohart, 2000^{i c g}
- Argogorytes constrictus (F. Smith, 1859)^{i c g}
- Argogorytes cruciger (Hacker and Cockerell, 1922)^{i c g}
- Argogorytes fairmairei (Handlirsch, 1893)^{i c g}
- Argogorytes fargeii (Shuckard, 1837)^{i g}
- Argogorytes fuliginosus Tsuneki, 1968^{i c g}
- Argogorytes hispanicus (Mercet, 1906)^{i c g}
- Argogorytes matangensis (R. Turner, 1914)^{i c g}
- Argogorytes mexicalis R. Bohart, 2000^{i c g}
- Argogorytes mystaceus (Linnaeus, 1761)^{i c g}
- Argogorytes nigrifrons (F. Smith, 1856)^{i c g b}
- Argogorytes nipponis Tsuneki, 1963^{i c g}
- Argogorytes palawanensis Tsuneki, 1976^{i c g}
- Argogorytes parkeri R. Bohart, 2000^{i c g}
- Argogorytes porteri R. Bohart, 2000^{i c g}
- Argogorytes quadrangulus R. Bohart, 2000^{i c g}
- Argogorytes rubrosignatus (R. Turner, 1915)^{i c g}
- Argogorytes rufomixtus (R. Turner, 1914)^{i c g}
- Argogorytes sapellonis (C. Baker, 1907)^{i c g}
- Argogorytes secernendus (R. Turner, 1915)^{i c g}
- Argogorytes similicolor (Dow, 1933)^{i c g}
- Argogorytes stenopygus (Handlirsch, 1895)^{i c g}
- Argogorytes tonkinensis (Yasumatsu, 1943)^{i c g}
- Argogorytes tristis Tsuneki, 1982^{i c g}
- Argogorytes umbratilis R. Bohart, 2000^{i c g}
- Argogorytes vagus (F. Smith, 1859)^{i c g}

Data sources: i = ITIS, c = Catalogue of Life, g = GBIF, b = Bugguide.net
