= Argogorytes nigrifrons =

Scientific classification
- Domain: Eukaryota
- Kingdom: Animalia
- Phylum: Arthropoda
- Class: Insecta
- Order: Hymenoptera
- Family: Bembicidae
- Tribe: Bembicini
- Subtribe: Exeirina
- Genus: Argogorytes
- Species: A. nigrifrons

Binomial name
- Argogorytes nigrifrons (F. Smith, 1856)

Synonyms
- Gorytes bollii Cresson, 1873; Gorytes neglectus Rohwer, 1911; Gorytes nigrifrons F. Smith, 1856

Species of wasp

Argogorytes nigrifrons is a species of sand wasp in the family Bembicidae. It is found in North America.
