= Epinysson basilaris =

Scientific classification
- Domain: Eukaryota
- Kingdom: Animalia
- Phylum: Arthropoda
- Class: Insecta
- Order: Hymenoptera
- Family: Bembicidae
- Genus: Epinysson
- Species: E. basilaris

Binomial name
- Epinysson basilaris (Cresson, 1882)

Synonyms
- Nysson basilaris Cresson, 1882; Nysson opulentus dakotensis Rohwer, 1921

Species of insect

Epinysson basilaris is a species of insect in the family Bembicidae. It is found in Central America and North America.
