= Nysson lateralis =

Scientific classification
- Domain: Eukaryota
- Kingdom: Animalia
- Phylum: Arthropoda
- Class: Insecta
- Order: Hymenoptera
- Family: Bembicidae
- Genus: Nysson
- Species: N. lateralis

Binomial name
- Nysson lateralis Packard, 1867

Species of wasp

Nysson lateralis is a species of wasp in the family Bembicidae, found in North America.
