= Epinysson mellipes =

Scientific classification
- Domain: Eukaryota
- Kingdom: Animalia
- Phylum: Arthropoda
- Class: Insecta
- Order: Hymenoptera
- Family: Bembicidae
- Genus: Epinysson
- Species: E. mellipes

Binomial name
- Epinysson mellipes (Cresson, 1882)

Synonyms
- Nysson mellipes Cresson, 1882; Nysson submellipes Viereck, 1904

Species of wasp

Epinysson mellipes is a species of wasp in the family Bembicidae. It is found in North America.
