= Nysson rusticus =

Scientific classification
- Domain: Eukaryota
- Kingdom: Animalia
- Phylum: Arthropoda
- Class: Insecta
- Order: Hymenoptera
- Family: Bembicidae
- Genus: Nysson
- Species: N. rusticus

Binomial name
- Nysson rusticus Cresson, 1882

Species of wasp

Nysson rusticus is a species of wasp in the family Bembicidae. It is found in North America.

== Subspecies ==
These two subspecies belong to the species Nysson rusticus:

- Nysson rusticus rusticus Cresson, 1882
- Nysson rusticus sphecodoides Bradley, 1920
