= Palco High School =

Palco Jr-Sr High School
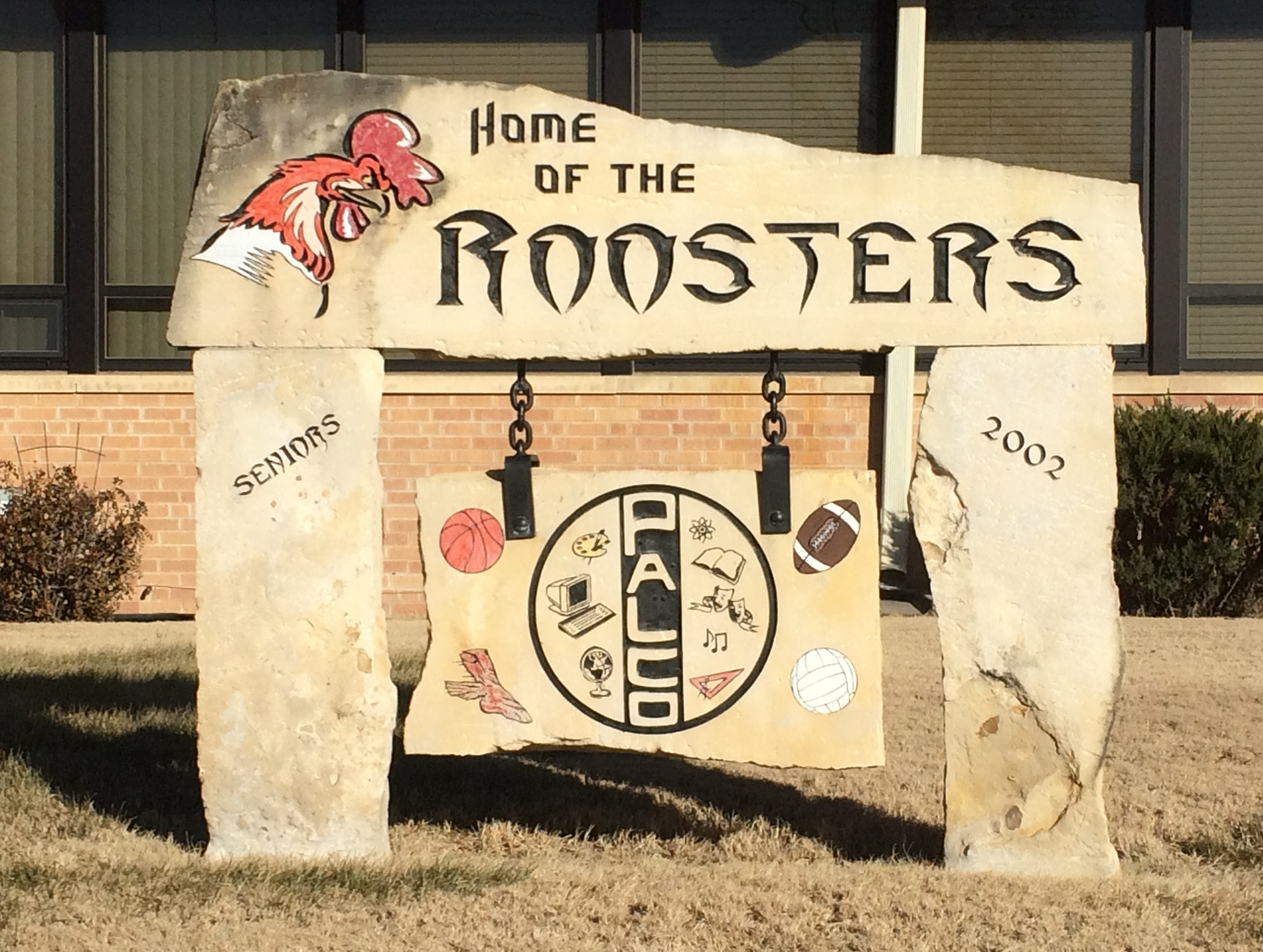
- Palco High School sign (2016)

Location
- 502 Ash Street; Palco, Kansas 67657; United States
- Coordinates: 39.2498°N 99.5651°W

Information
- School type: Public, High School
- Teaching staff: 3.62 (FTE)
- Enrollment: 19 (2024–2025)
- Student to teacher ratio: 5.25
- Color
- Team name: Roosters

Palco High School is a public high school in Palco, Kansas, United States. It is operated by Palco USD 269 school district, and serves the communities of Damar, Palco, and Zurich. The school mascot is a rooster and the school colors are black and gold. Palco High School is a relatively small and rural high school.

== History ==
The Palco Roosters won the Kansas State High School boys class B Indoor Track & Field championship in 1962.

== See also ==
- List of high schools in Kansas
- List of unified school districts in Kansas
