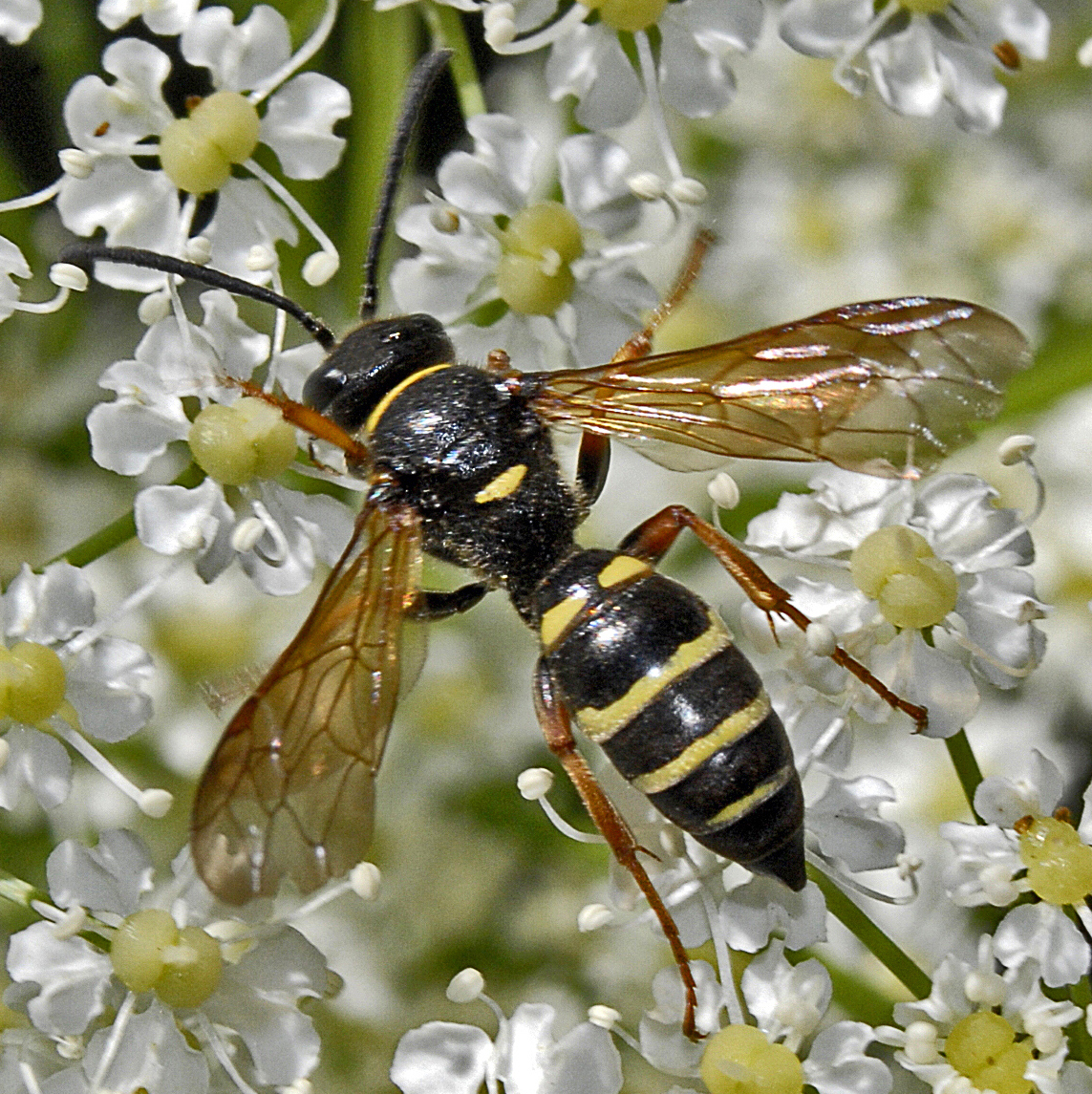
- Argogorytes mystaceus. Dorsal view

Scientific classification
- Kingdom: Animalia
- Phylum: Arthropoda
- Class: Insecta
- Order: Hymenoptera
- Family: Bembicidae
- Genus: Argogorytes
- Species: A. mystaceus

Binomial name
- Argogorytes mystaceus (Linnaeus, 1761)

Synonyms
- List: Apis mystacea Linné, 1761; Arpactus campestris Linné, 1761; Arpactus mystaceus Linné, 1761; Crabro bicinctus Fabricius, 1793; Crabro mystaceus Linné, 1761; Gorytes arpactus Fabricius, 1804; Gorytes campestris Linné, 1761; Gorytes mystaceus Linné, 1761; Gorytes mystaceus tonsus Bondroit, 1933; Gorytes tonsus Bondroit, 1933; Mellinus arpactus Fabricius, 1804; Mellinus campestris Linné, 1761; Mellinus mystaceus Linné, 1761; Sphex longicornis Rossi, 1790; Sphex mystaceus Linné, 1761; Vespa campestris Linné, 1761; Vespa flavicincta Donovan, 1808; Vespa inimica M. Harris, 1776

= Argogorytes mystaceus =

Species of wasp

Argogorytes mystaceus is a species of solitary wasp in the family Bembicidae.

== Distribution ==
This species has a Palearctic distribution occurring in most European countries from Ireland in the west and east to Siberia, Japan, Korea, China; south to Turkey.

== Habitat ==
These wasps prefer deciduous woodland and hedge rows with sandy soil in sunny mountain areas with abundant flowering plants, at an elevation of over 1,000 metres (3,300 ft) above sea level.

== Description ==
Argogorytes mystaceus can reach a length of 10–14 millimetres (0.39–0.55 in) in females, of 8–11 millimetres (0.31–0.43 in) in males. These medium-sized wasps have a black abdomen with a few yellow stripes and no petiole. In males antennae are very long. Mesothorax and scutellum are black. Legs are pale yellowish brown, with a black base.

== Biology ==
Females of Argogorytes mystaceus usually visit Apiaceae flowers, wood spurge and honeydew on sweet chestnut leaves. Males are known to be pollinator of the flowers of fly orchids (mainly Ophrys insectifera). The males of this species try to copulate (pseudocopulation) with these specialized flowers, that mimic (pouyannian mimicry) the shape and the scent of the females, with the purpose of deceiving them and thereby pollinate the flowers.

These solitary wasps nest in soil in dry banks. Larvae feed on nymphs of small leafhoppers and spittlebugs (mainly Philaenus and Aphrophora species). They fly in one generation from mid-May to mid-August. Among their natural enemies there are parasitoid wasps (especially Ichneumonidae larvae) and nest parasites (Nysson spinosus).
