= Losada (wasp) =

Scientific classification
- Domain: Eukaryota
- Kingdom: Animalia
- Phylum: Arthropoda
- Class: Insecta
- Order: Hymenoptera
- Family: Bembicidae
- Subfamily: Nyssoninae
- Tribe: Nyssonini
- Subtribe: Nyssonina
- Genus: Losada; Pate, 1940

Genus of wasps

Losada is a small genus of kleptoparasitic wasps found in South America. Species include:

- Losada mutilloides (Ducke, 1903)
- Losada paria Pate, 1840
- Losada penai Fritz, 1873
