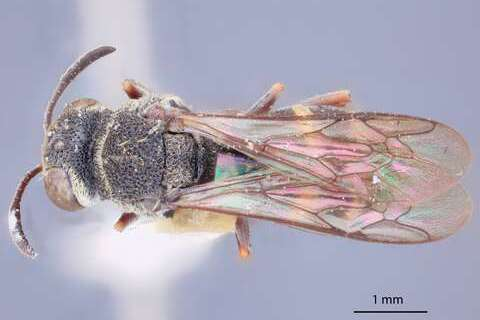

Scientific classification
- Kingdom: Animalia
- Phylum: Arthropoda
- Class: Insecta
- Order: Hymenoptera
- Family: Bembicidae
- Tribe: Nyssonini
- Genus: Foxia; Ashmead, 1898

Type species
- Foxia pacifica Ashmead, 1898

Species
- See text

= Foxia =

Genus of wasps

The genus Foxia is a group of cleptoparasitic bembicine wasps that occur in xeric habitats in the New World. There are 10 described species, ranging from Chile and Argentina to the United States.

== Species ==
These 10 species belong to the genus Foxia:

- Foxia cuna Pate, 1938^{i c g}
- Foxia deserticola Fritz, 1959^{i c g}
- Foxia divergens (Ducke, 1903)^{i c g}
- Foxia garciai Fritz, 1972^{i c g}
- Foxia martinezi Fritz, 1972^{i c g}
- Foxia navajo Pate, 1938^{i c g b}
- Foxia pacifica Ashmead, 1898^{i c g}
- Foxia pirita Fritz, 1972^{i c g}
- Foxia secunda (Rohwer, 1921)^{i c g}
- Foxia tercera Fritz, 1972^{i c g}

Data sources: i = ITIS, c = Catalogue of Life, g = GBIF, b = Bugguide.net
