= Nysson tristis =

Scientific classification
- Domain: Eukaryota
- Kingdom: Animalia
- Phylum: Arthropoda
- Class: Insecta
- Order: Hymenoptera
- Family: Bembicidae
- Genus: Nysson
- Species: N. tristis

Binomial name
- Nysson tristis Cresson, 1882

Species of wasp

Nysson tristis is a species of wasp in the family Bembicidae. It is found in North America.
