= Epinysson =

- Epinysson tramosericus

Scientific classification
- Kingdom: Animalia
- Phylum: Arthropoda
- Clade: Pancrustacea
- Class: Insecta
- Order: Hymenoptera
- Family: Bembicidae
- Tribe: Nyssonini
- Genus: Epinysson; Pate, 1935

Genus of wasps

Epinysson is a genus of kleptoparasitic wasps in the family Bembicidae. There are more than 20 described species in the genus Epinysson.

== Species ==
These 23 species belong to the genus Epinysson:

- Epinysson albomarginatus (Cresson, 1882)
- Epinysson arentis R. Bohart, 1968
- Epinysson aztecus (Cresson, 1882)
- Epinysson basilaris (Cresson, 1882)
- Epinysson bellus (Cresson, 1882)
- Epinysson bifasciatus (Brèthes, 1913)
- Epinysson borinquinensis (Pate, 1937)
- Epinysson casali (Fritz, 1968)
- Epinysson desertus R. Bohart, 1968
- Epinysson inconspicuus (Ducke, 1910)
- Epinysson mellipes (Cresson, 1882)
- Epinysson metathoracicus (H. Smith, 1908)
- Epinysson moestus (Cresson, 1882)
- Epinysson opulentus (Gerstäcker, 1867)
- Epinysson orientalis (Alayo Dalmau, 1969)
- Epinysson pacificus (Rohwer, 1917)
- Epinysson partamona (Pate, 1938)
- Epinysson sigua (Pate, 1938)
- Epinysson tomentosus (Handlirsch, 1887)
- Epinysson torridus R. Bohart, 1968
- Epinysson tramosericus (Viereck, 1904)
- Epinysson tuberculatus (Handlirsch, 1887)
- Epinysson zapotecus (Cresson, 1882)
