= Seven Dolors Catholic Church =

Historic church in Kansas, United States

- U.S. National Register of Historic Places
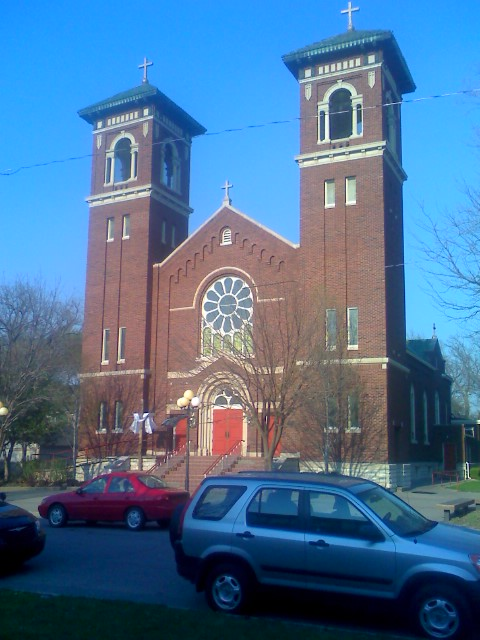
- Front of the church

- Location within Kansas Location within the United States
- Location: Northeast of the junction of Juliette and Pierre Sts. in Manhattan, Kansas
- Coordinates: 39°10′39″N 96°33′57″W
- Area: less than one acre
- Built: 1920
- Architect: H.W. Brinkman; Mont J. Green
- Architectural style: Romanesque
- NRHP reference No.: 95001054
- Added to NRHP: September 1, 1995

The Seven Dolors Catholic Church is a Catholic church in Manhattan, Kansas, United States, and is the see of the Seven Dolors Parish, which also contains Saint Patrick's Church in Ogden. The Parish is the easternmost in the Salina Diocese.

Built in 1920, the church was added to the National Register of Historic Places in 1995.
