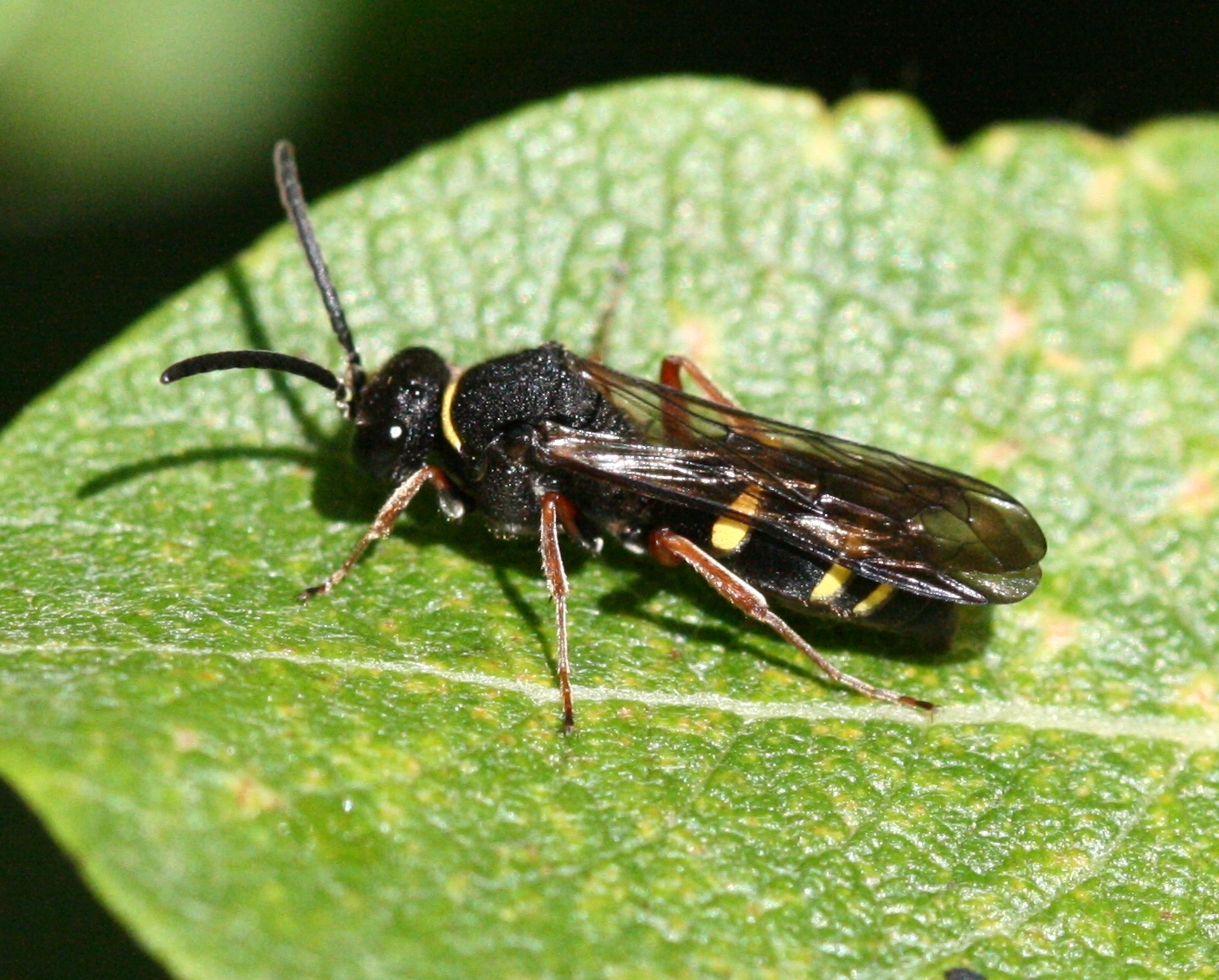
- female

Scientific classification
- Domain: Eukaryota
- Kingdom: Animalia
- Phylum: Arthropoda
- Class: Insecta
- Order: Hymenoptera
- Family: Bembicidae
- Genus: Nysson
- Species: N. spinosus

Binomial name
- Nysson spinosus (J. Forster, 1771)

Synonyms
- Sphex spinosus Forster, 1771; Crabro spinosus Fabricius, 1775; Mellinus tricinctus Fabricius, 1793; Vespa trilineata Turton, 1802; Nysson geniculatus Lepeletier, 1845; Nysson malaise Gussakovskij, 1932

= Nysson spinosus =

Species of wasp

Nysson spinosus, the large-spurred digger wasp, is a species of cleptoparasitic wasp of the family Bembicidae which is found in the Palearctic.

== Description ==
Nysson spinosus has a black body and the anterior margin of the pronotum is yellow contrasting with the black scutellum. There are three yellow stripes on the abdomen with the anterior one being split or narrowed towards the centre and the others clearly unbroken. The males are blacker and have thinner yellow bands on the abdomen than the females and have completely black legs while females have some yellow on the legs. The antennae are black. The front wing has 3 cubic cells with the middle cell showing a stylus, a diagnostic feature of the genus Nysson. The female is 8–12 mm in length and the male measures 7–10 mm which is larger than most of the other European species of Nysson.

== Distribution ==
Nysson spinosus occurs widely in the Palearctic from Great Britain and Scandinavia east to the Pacific coast of Russia and Japan.

== Biology ==
Nysson spinosus mirrors its hosts' habitat, especially that of Argogorytes mystaceus and to a lesser extent of Argogorytes fargei, in that it prefers sunny places, especially the edges of deciduous woodland. The hosts are species of woodland glades with rank vegetation. In Britain it flies between May and July. The eggs are laid in the burrows of A. mystaceus and A. fargei which the female detects by scent. The egg hatches before the host's egg and the larvae consumes the host's egg first and then the stored prey. In Europe this species is also known to occasionally use wasps of the genus Gorytes as hosts, although this has not been recorded in Great Britain. The adults have been recorded nectaring on Apiaceae, Lotus corniculatus, Euphorbia amygdaloides, Knautia arvensis, Succisa pratensis and Jasione montana. It is thought that N. spinosus may be a host of hyperparasitic species of sarcophagid flies of the subfamily Miltogramminae and possibly some species of Ichneumon. In Europe it is also known to occasionally use wasps of the genus Gorytes as hosts

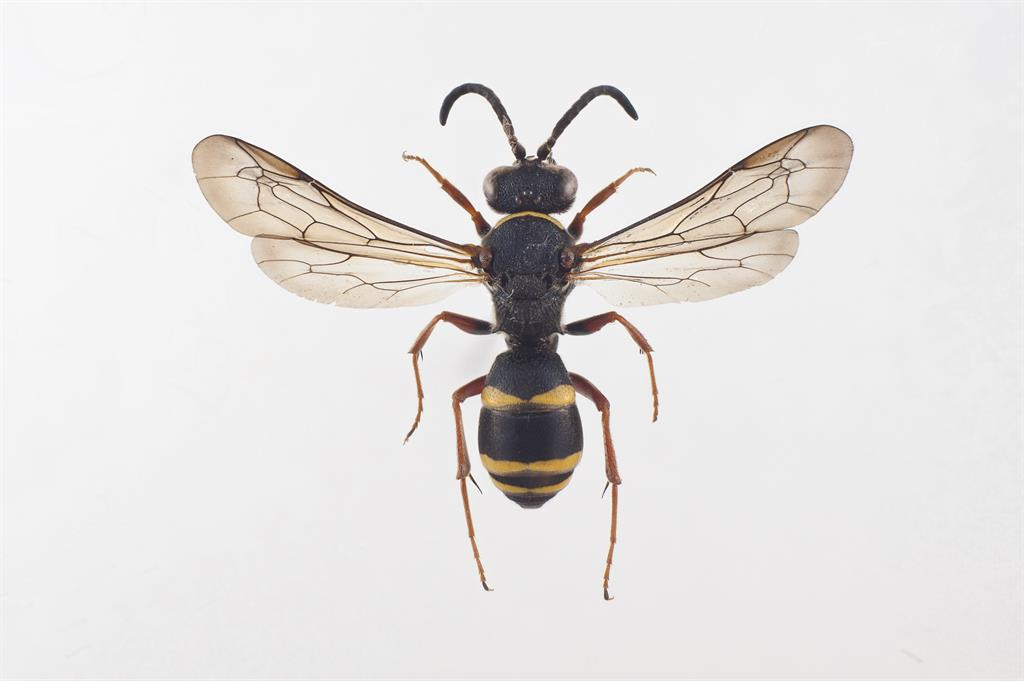
mounted specimen
