= St. Joseph Catholic Church (Damar, Kansas) =

Historic church in Kansas, United States

- U.S. National Register of Historic Places
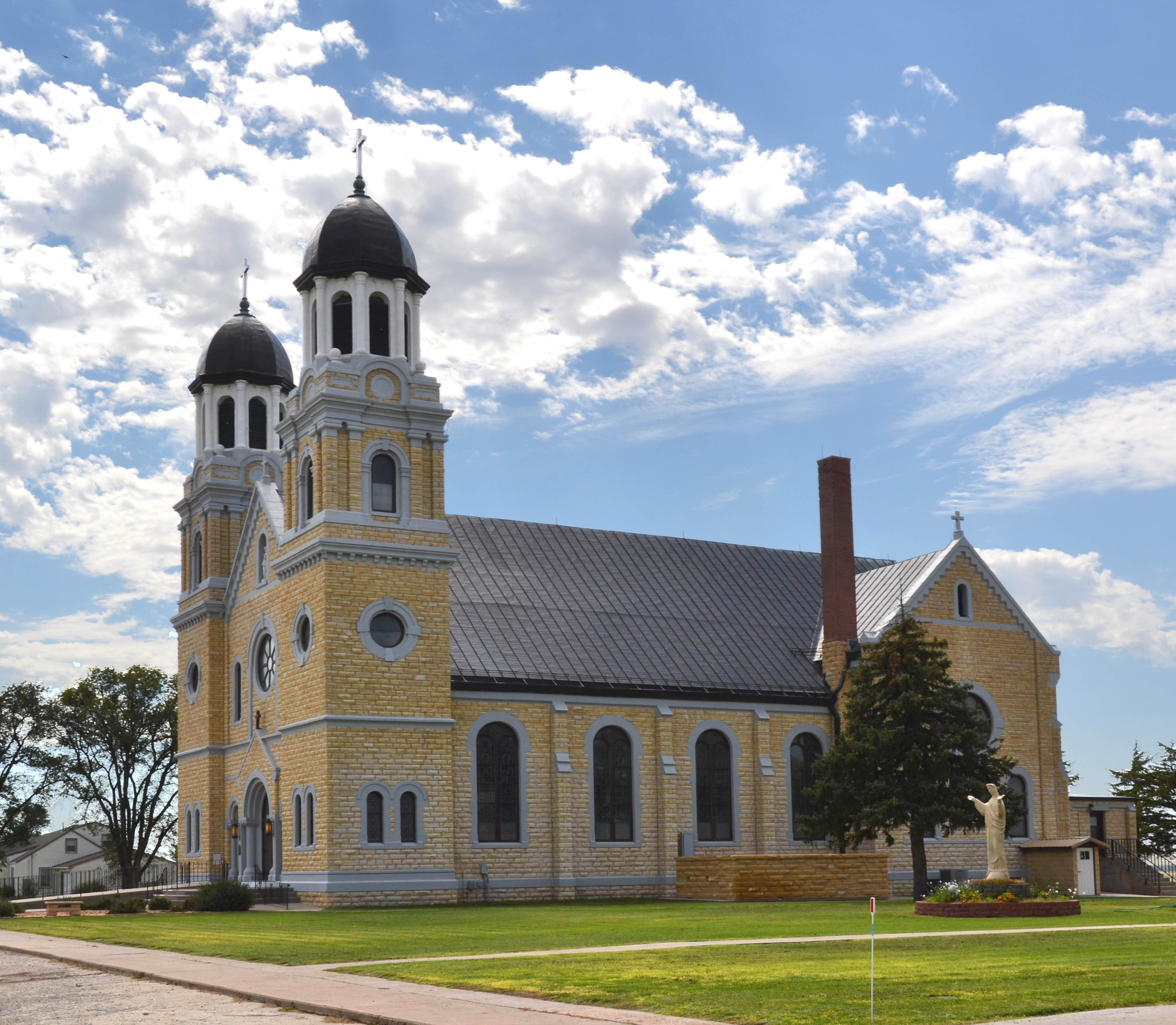

- Location within Kansas Location within the United States
- Location: 105 N. Oak St., Damar, Kansas
- Coordinates: 39°19′7″N 99°35′11″W
- Area: 3 acres (1.2 ha)
- Built: 1912
- Built by: Frank Antone Rothenberger and Cidney Brown
- Architect: Henry W. Brinkman
- Architectural style: Romanesque
- NRHP reference No.: 05001203
- Added to NRHP: November 5, 2005

St. Joseph Catholic Church is a historic church at 105 N. Oak Street in Damar, Kansas, United States. It was built in 1912 and added to the National Register in 2005. It was designed in the Romanesque Revival architectural style. The church recently underwent a restoration project, completed in 2007.

It has a copper roof that is "penny-thickness" which was installed in 1947.

== Photo gallery ==
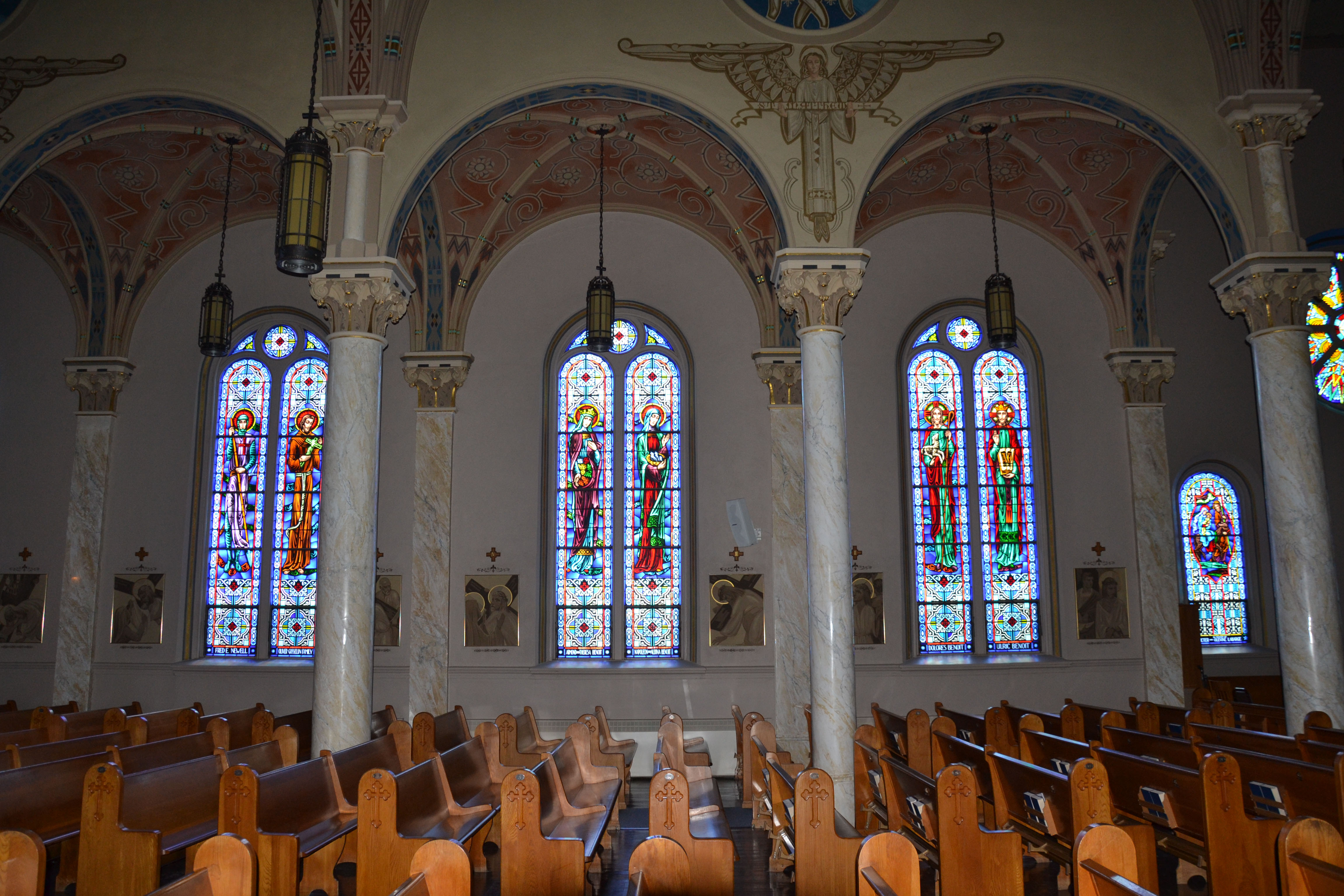

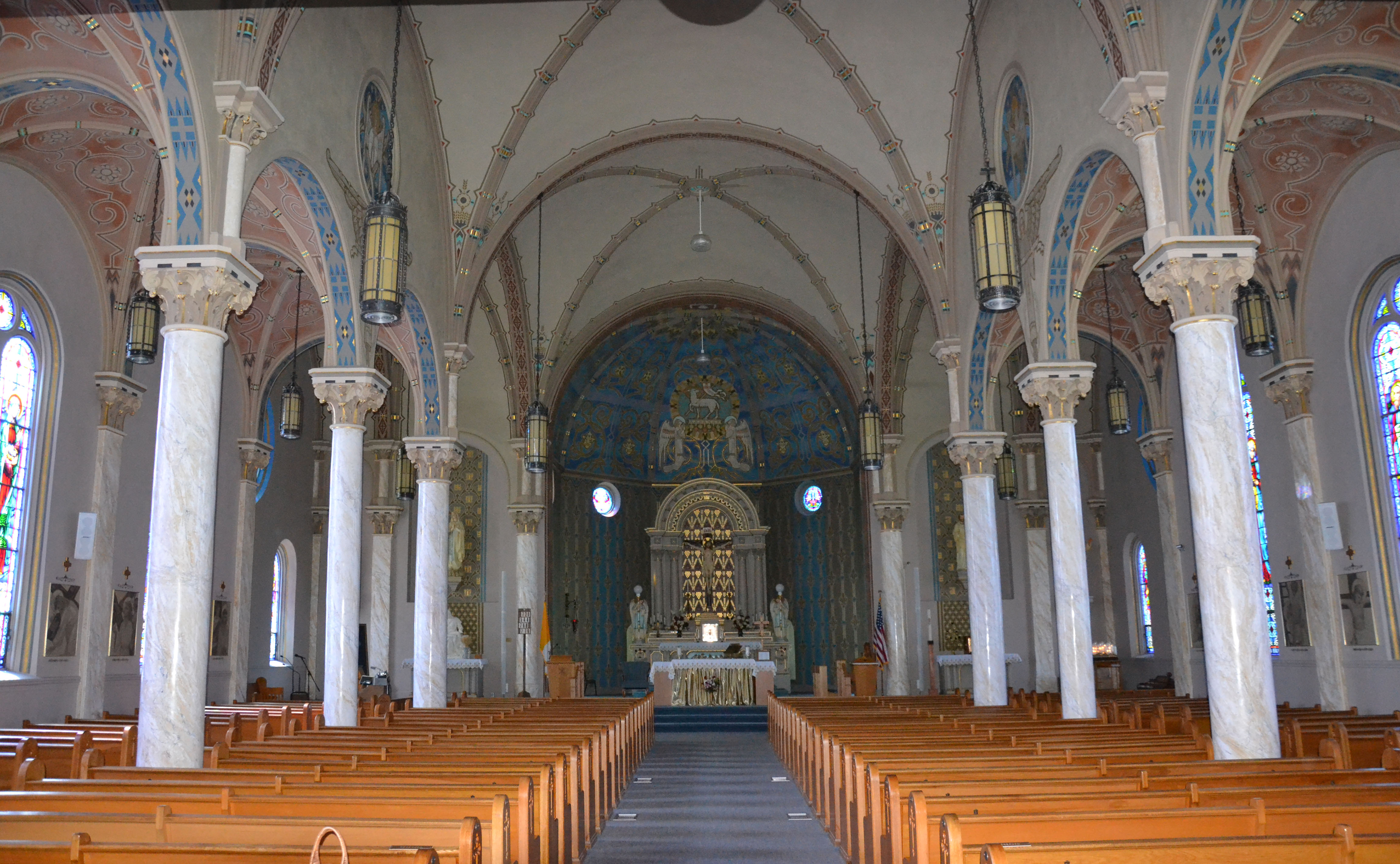

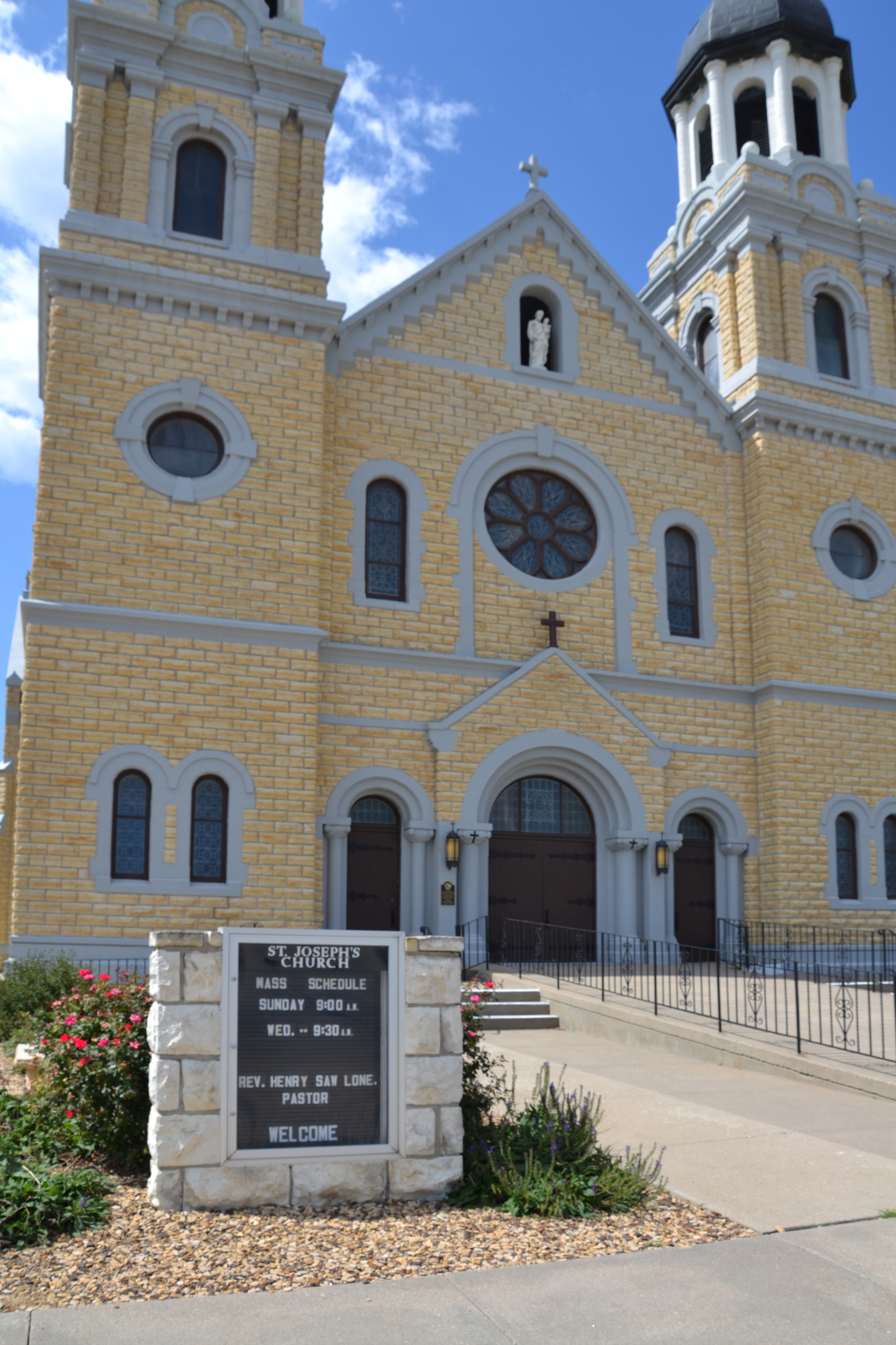

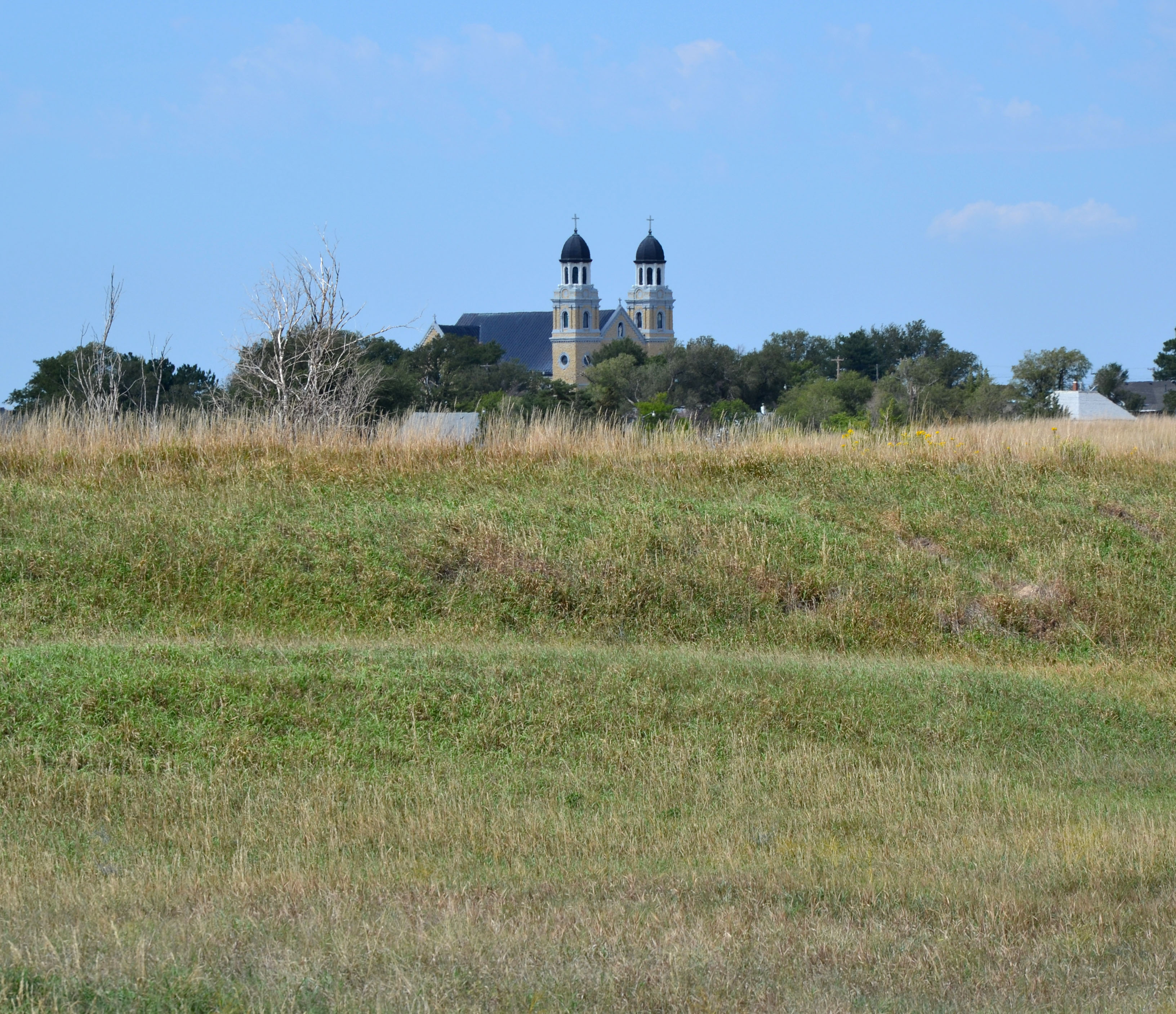

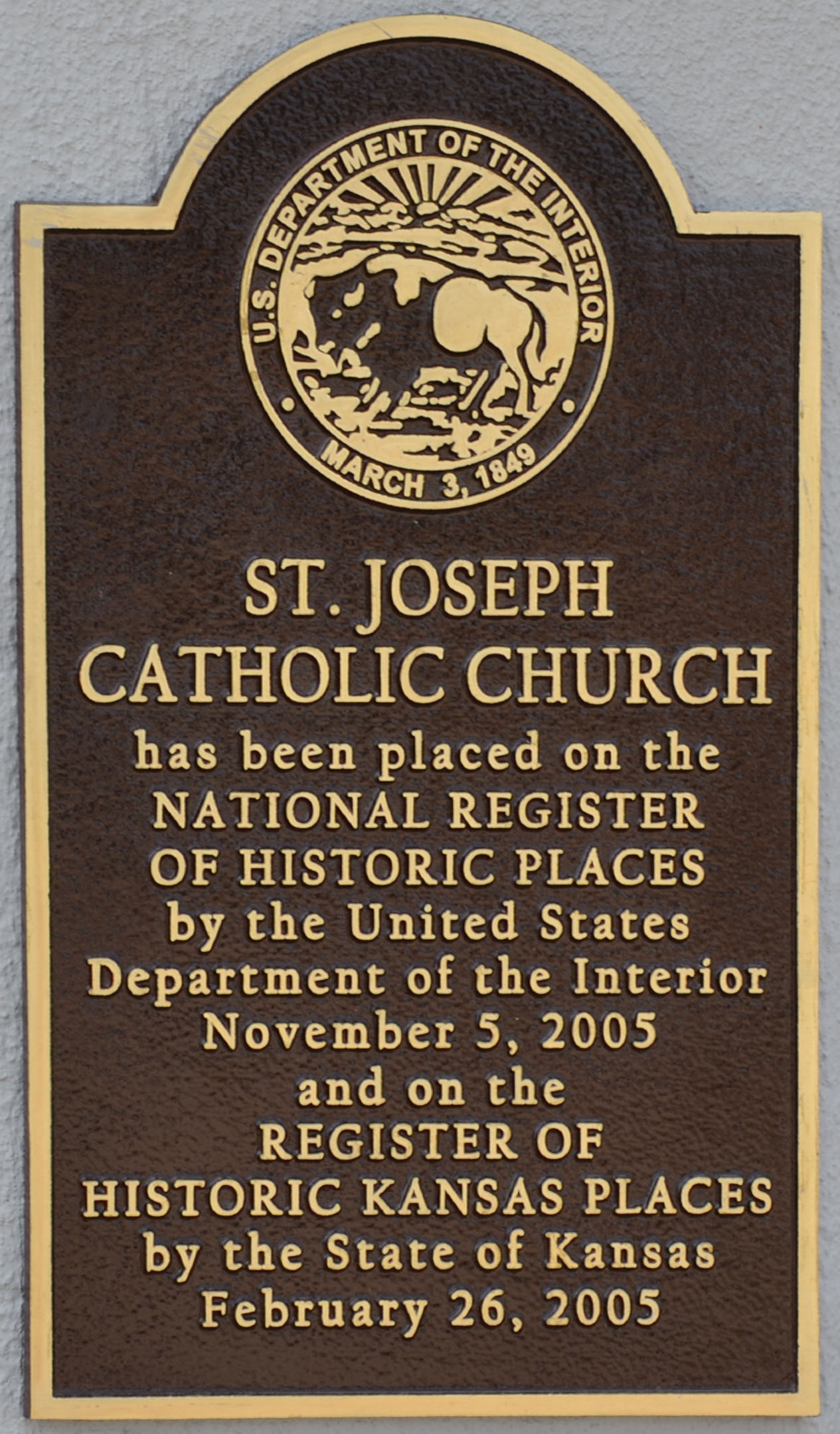
