= Cresson, Kansas =

- Ghost town
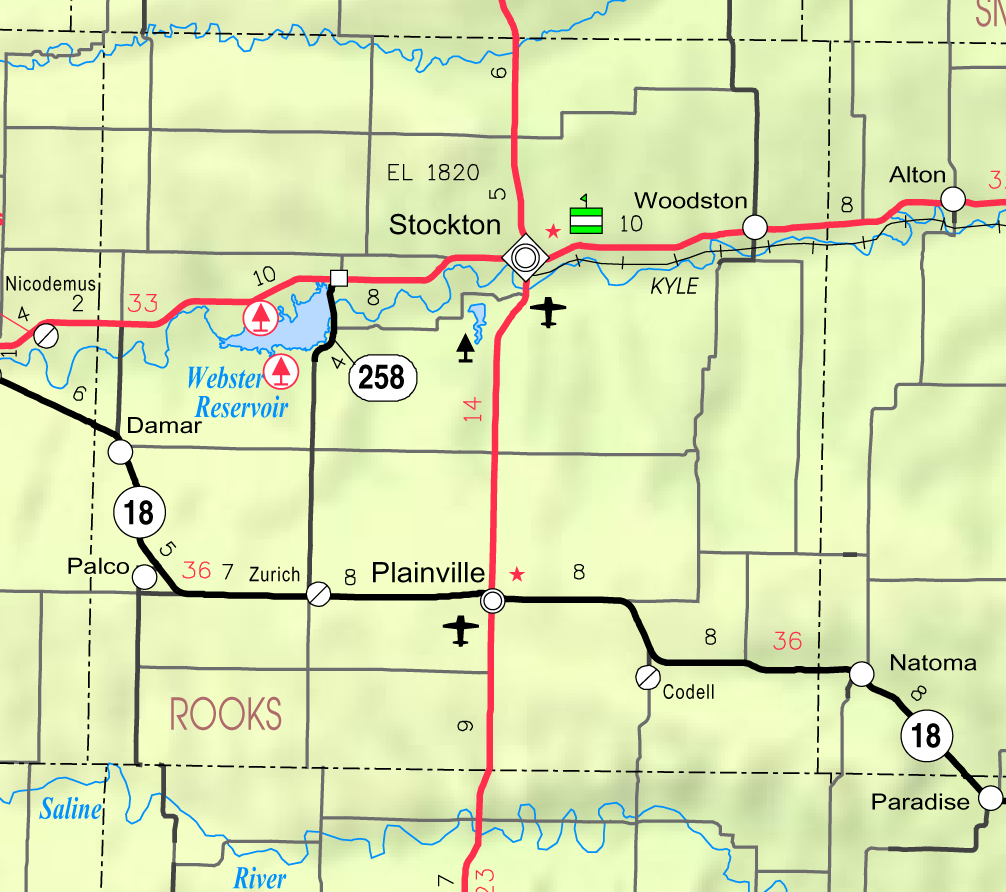
- KDOT map of Rooks County (legend)

- Location within Kansas Location within the United States
- Coordinates: 39°16′40″N 99°35′07″W
- Country: United States
- State: Kansas
- County: Rooks
- Elevation: 2,234 ft (681 m)

Population
  - Total: 0
- Time zone: UTC-6 (CST)
  - Summer (DST): UTC-5 (CDT)
- Area code: 785
- GNIS ID: 482530

Cresson is a ghost town in Northampton Township, Rooks County, Kansas, United States.

== History ==
Cresson, Kansas (named for Cresson, PA) was granted a post office in 1879. In 1887, rumors circulated that Union Pacific Railroad would lay track 1 1/2 miles to the south of Cresson. Many citizens and businesses abandoned Cresson to form the community of New Cresson along the expected railroad route. In 1888, Union Pacific established the railroad near the original location of Cresson, then created Palco as a depot. Nothing is left of Cresson or New Cresson.
