= Palco, Kansas =

City in Rooks County, Kansas

- City
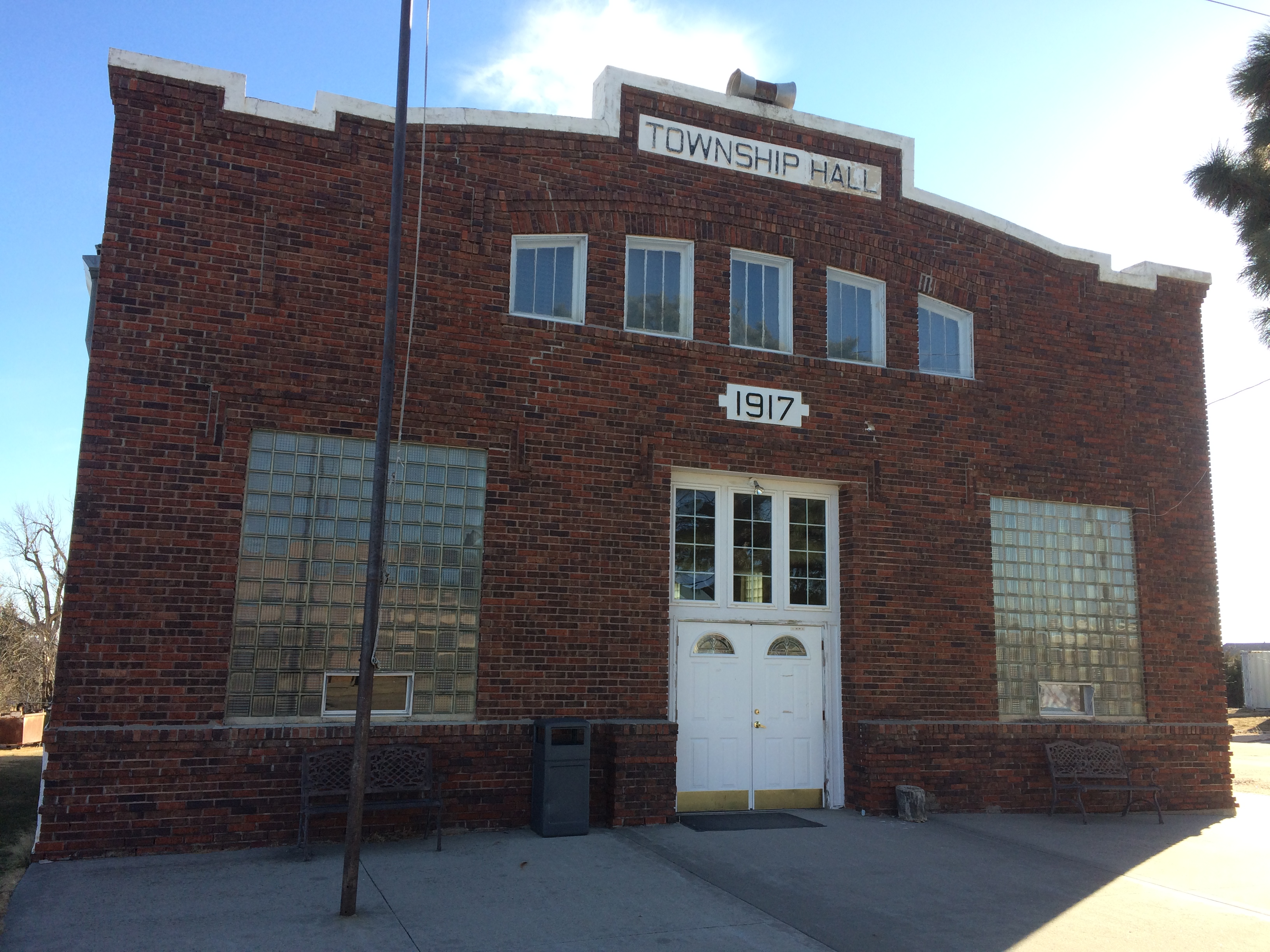
- Township Hall (2016)

- Location within Rooks County and Kansas

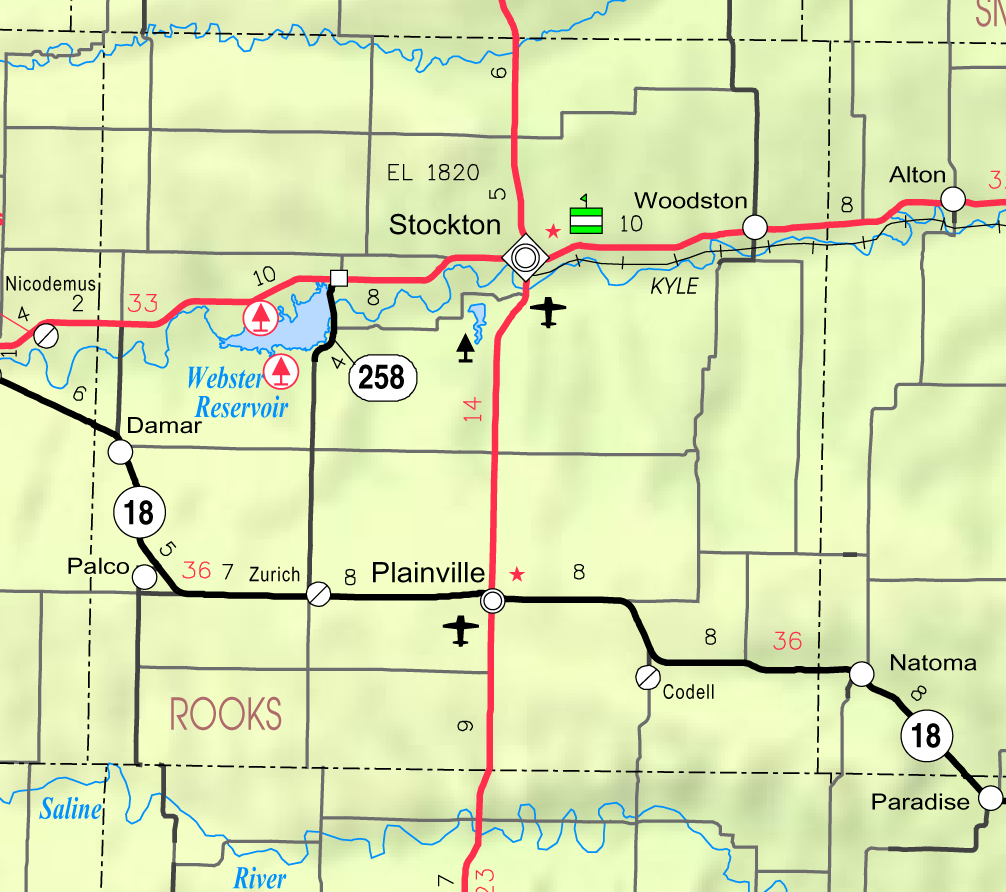
- KDOT map of Rooks County (legend)
- Coordinates: 39°15′10″N 99°33′49″W
- Country: United States
- State: Kansas
- County: Rooks
- Founded: 1888
- Incorporated: 1903
- Named for: Palmer and Cole

Area
  - Total: 0.27 sq mi (0.69 km^{2})
  - Land: 0.27 sq mi (0.69 km^{2})
  - Water: 0 sq mi (0.00 km^{2})
- Elevation: 2,277 ft (694 m)

Population (2020)
  - Total: 208
  - Density: 780/sq mi (300/km^{2})
- Time zone: UTC-6 (CST)
  - Summer (DST): UTC-5 (CDT)
- ZIP Code: 67657
- Area code: 785
- FIPS code: 20-54125
- GNIS ID: 2396127
- Website: City website

Palco is a city in Rooks County, Kansas, United States. As of the 2020 census, the population of the city was 208.

== History ==
Palco was established in 1888 by Union Pacific Railroad as a train depot on a newly formed line. The town was given the name Palco as a portmanteau for railroad officials Palmer and Cole.

The post office was moved from the nearby town of Cresson. Cresson (named for Cresson, Pennsylvania) was granted a post office in 1879. In 1887, rumors circulated that the railroad would lay track 1 1/2 miles to the south of Cresson. Many citizens and businesses abandoned Cresson to form the community of New Cresson along the expected railroad route. When the railroad track was laid it curved to the north missing New Cresson. The town was soon abandoned. An ironic twist is that the northern route of the track passed near the original town of Cresson.

In 1893, Palco was nearly wiped out by a prairie fire. The fire originated in Graham County and consumed thousands of acres along with farmsteads and livestock in Graham, Rooks, Ellis and Russell Counties before being extinguished. Seven people lost their lives in the blaze.

Palco filed for incorporation as a third class city in 1906 and elected Robert Kirkendall as mayor.

Fire again struck Palco in 1923, destroying many businesses along Main Street including the hotel, post office, real estate office and a doctor's office.

== Geography ==
According to the United States Census Bureau, the city has a total area of 0.27 square miles (0.70 km^{2}), all land.

=== Climate ===
The climate in this area is characterized by hot, humid summers and generally mild to cool winters. According to the Köppen Climate Classification system, Palco has a humid subtropical climate, abbreviated "Cfa" on climate maps.

== Demographics ==
Historical population
| Census | Pop. | Note | %± |
|---|---|---|---|
| 1910 | 279 | | — |
| 1920 | 281 | | 0.7% |
| 1930 | 290 | | 3.2% |
| 1940 | 276 | | −4.8% |
| 1950 | 405 | | 46.7% |
| 1960 | 575 | | 42.0% |
| 1970 | 398 | | −30.8% |
| 1980 | 329 | | −17.3% |
| 1990 | 295 | | −10.3% |
| 2000 | 248 | | −15.9% |
| 2010 | 277 | | 11.7% |
| 2020 | 208 | | −24.9% |
U.S. Decennial Census

=== 2020 census ===
The 2020 United States census counted 208 people, 96 households, and 51 families in Palco. The population density was 776.1 per square mile (299.7/km^{2}). There were 134 housing units at an average density of 500.0 per square mile (193.1/km^{2}). The racial makeup was 90.38% (188) white or European American (90.38% non-Hispanic white), 0.96% (2) black or African-American, 0.48% (1) Native American or Alaska Native, 0.0% (0) Asian, 0.48% (1) Pacific Islander or Native Hawaiian, 0.0% (0) from other races, and 7.69% (16) from two or more races. Hispanic or Latino of any race was 3.37% (7) of the population.

Of the 96 households, 21.9% had children under the age of 18; 44.8% were married couples living together; 21.9% had a female householder with no spouse or partner present. 39.6% of households consisted of individuals and 19.8% had someone living alone who was 65 years of age or older. The average household size was 1.8 and the average family size was 2.7. The percent of those with a bachelor's degree or higher was estimated to be 12.5% of the population.

24.0% of the population was under the age of 18, 2.9% from 18 to 24, 18.3% from 25 to 44, 28.4% from 45 to 64, and 26.4% who were 65 years of age or older. The median age was 49.5 years. For every 100 females, there were 103.9 males. For every 100 females ages 18 and older, there were 90.4 males.

The 2016–2020 5-year American Community Survey estimates show that the median household income was $33,438 (with a margin of error of +/- $12,759) and the median family income was $41,250 (+/- $28,777). Females had a median income of $16,250 (+/- $6,367). The median income for those above 16 years old was $19,583 (+/- $14,327). Approximately, 15.6% of families and 18.0% of the population were below the poverty line, including 36.0% of those under the age of 18 and 3.8% of those ages 65 or over.

=== 2010 census ===
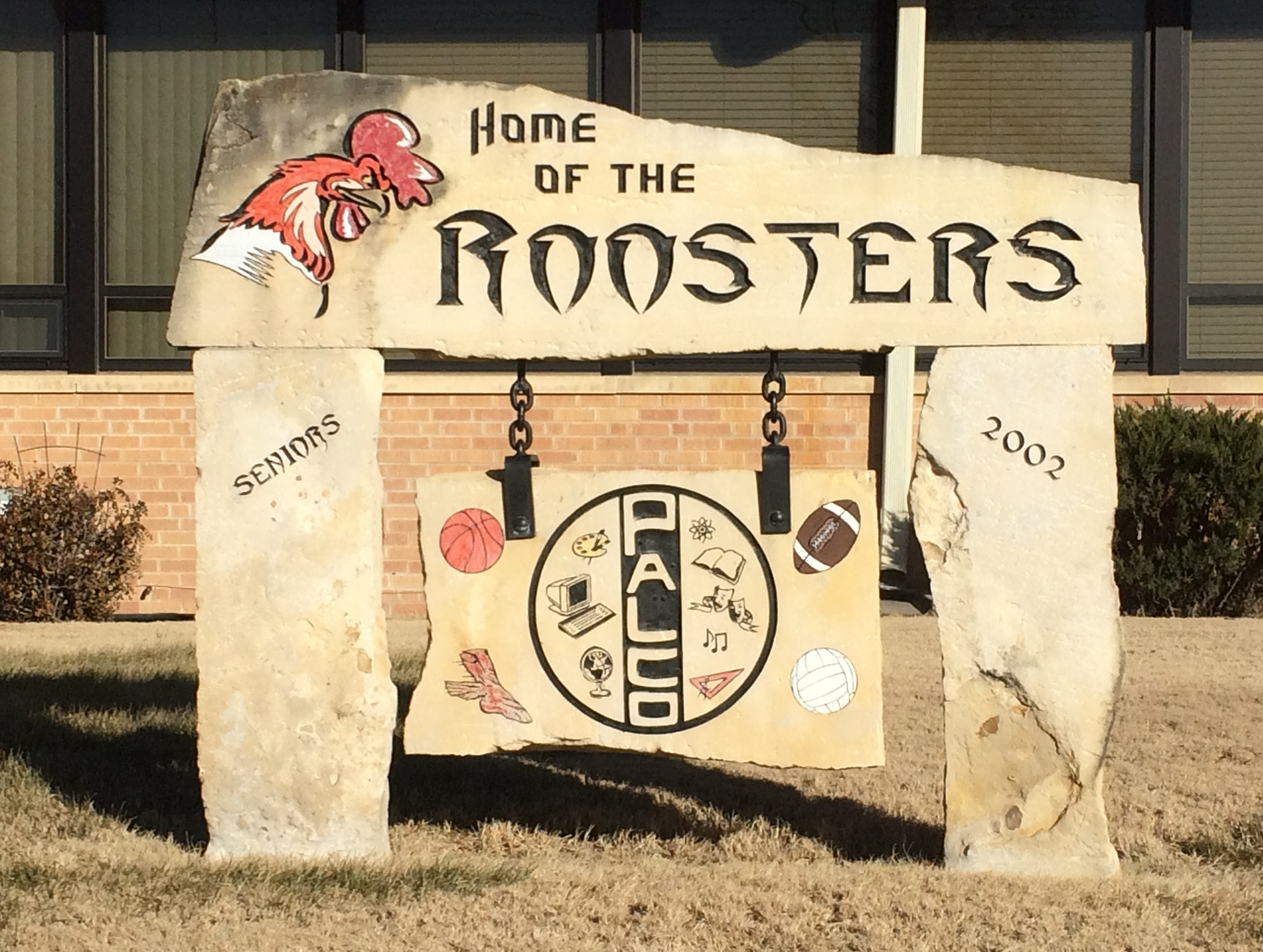
Limestone sign at Palco High School (2016)

As of the census of 2010, there were 277 people, 112 households, and 71 families residing in the city. The population density was 1,025.9 inhabitants per square mile (396.1/km^{2}). There were 153 housing units at an average density of 566.7 per square mile (218.8/km^{2}). The racial makeup of the city was 94.2% White, 3.2% African American, 0.4% Native American, 0.4% Pacific Islander, 0.4% from other races, and 1.4% from two or more races. Hispanic or Latino of any race were 5.1% of the population.

There were 112 households, of which 34.8% had children under the age of 18 living with them, 42.9% were married couples living together, 15.2% had a female householder with no husband present, 5.4% had a male householder with no wife present, and 36.6% were non-families. 33.9% of all households were made up of individuals, and 17.9% had someone living alone who was 65 years of age or older. The average household size was 2.47 and the average family size was 3.11.

The median age in the city was 32.7 years. 30.7% of residents were under the age of 18; 7.2% were between the ages of 18 and 24; 20.6% were from 25 to 44; 22.7% were from 45 to 64; and 18.8% were 65 years of age or older. The gender makeup of the city was 46.9% male and 53.1% female.

== Education ==
The community is served by Palco USD 269 public school district. It has two schools: Damar Elementary School is located in Damar, Palco Jr-Sr High School is located in Palco.

The Palco Roosters won the Kansas State High School boys class B Indoor Track & Field championship in 1962.
