= Cresson (wasp) =

Scientific classification
- Domain: Eukaryota
- Kingdom: Animalia
- Phylum: Arthropoda
- Class: Insecta
- Order: Hymenoptera
- Family: Bembicidae
- Subfamily: Nyssoninae
- Tribe: Nyssonini
- Subtribe: Nyssonina
- Genus: Cresson; Pate, 1938

Genus of insects

Cresson is a South American genus of kleptoparasitic wasps in the family Bembicidae.

== Species ==
- Cresson mariastea Packer, 2021
- Cresson parvispinosus (Reed, 1894)
- Cresson salitrera Packer, 2021
