= Damar, Kansas =

City in Rooks County, Kansas

- City
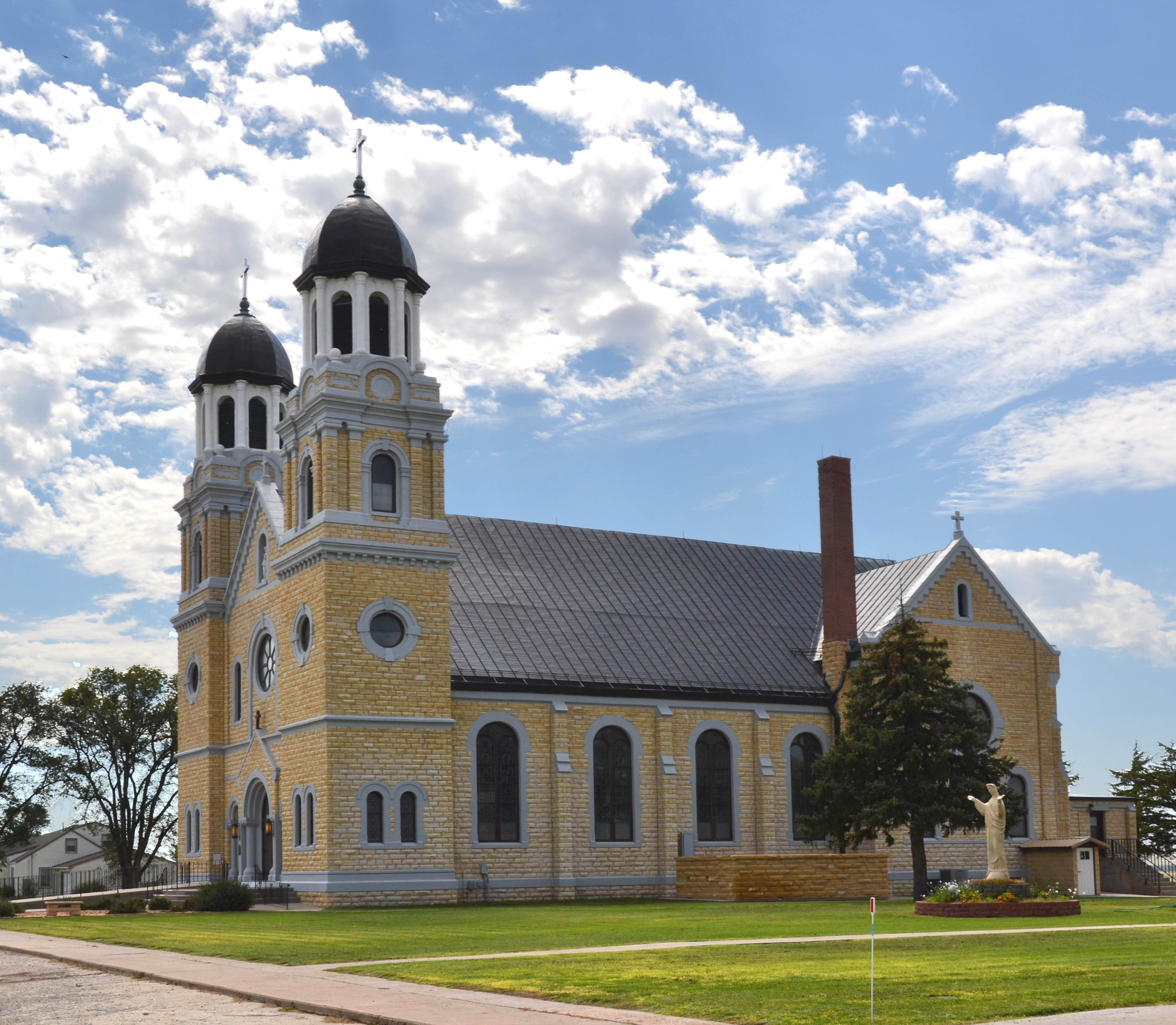
- St. Joseph Catholic Church (2012)

- Location within Rooks County and Kansas

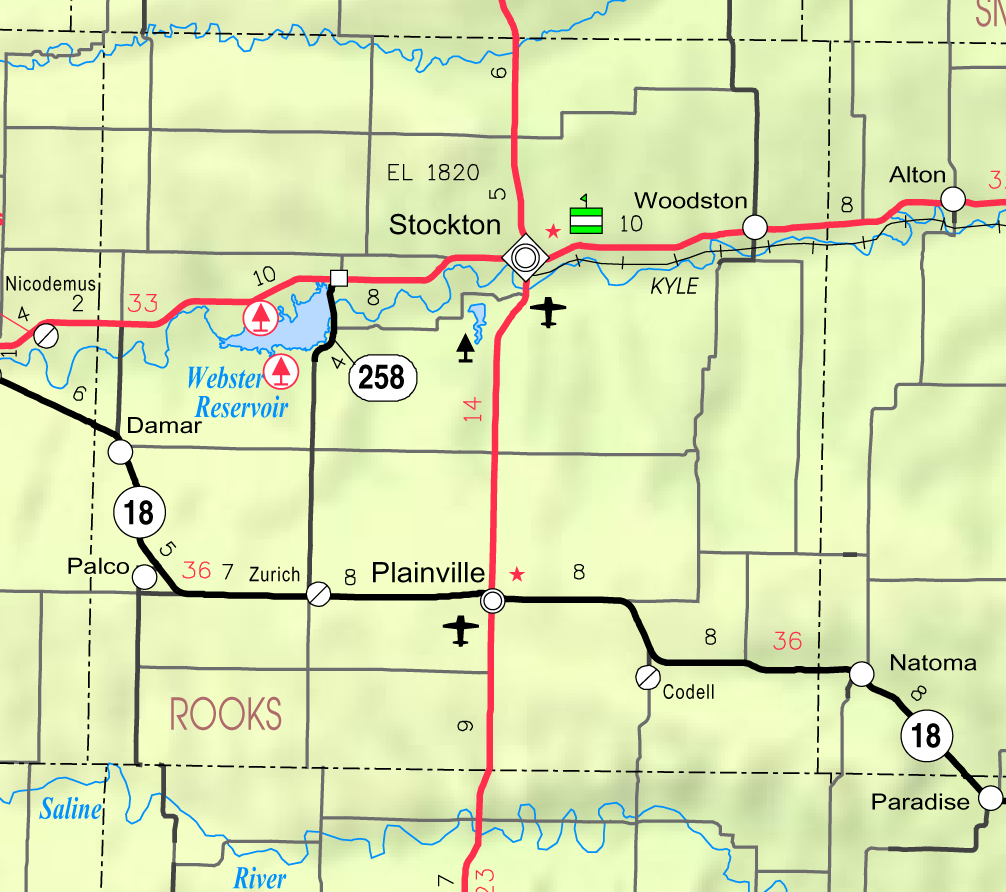
- KDOT map of Rooks County (legend)
- Coordinates: 39°19′09″N 99°35′04″W
- Country: United States
- State: Kansas
- County: Rooks
- Founded: 1888
- Incorporated: 1935
- Named for: D.M. Marr

Area
  - Total: 0.19 sq mi (0.49 km^{2})
  - Land: 0.19 sq mi (0.49 km^{2})
  - Water: 0 sq mi (0.00 km^{2})
- Elevation: 2,120 ft (650 m)

Population (2020)
  - Total: 112
  - Density: 590/sq mi (230/km^{2})
- Time zone: UTC-6 (CST)
  - Summer (DST): UTC-5 (CDT)
- ZIP Code: 67632
- Area code: 785
- FIPS code: 20-16975
- GNIS ID: 2393710
- Website: damarkansas.com

Damar is a city in Rooks County, Kansas, United States. As of the 2020 census, the population of the city was 112.

== History ==
Damar was established along the Union Pacific Railroad in 1888 by a community of French Canadian emigres. The community had emigrated from Canada as early as 1871, settling on farms along the Rooks County-Graham County line in northwestern Kansas. According to tradition, the community was named after D.M. Marr, the original owner of the town site.

The nearby Enfield Post Office was relocated to Damar in 1894.

St. Joseph Catholic Church was constructed in 1912. The church was listed in the National Register of Historic Places in 2005.

In 1920, Damar had three elevators, two implement dealerships, a hardware store, a lumber yard, a dry goods store, grocery stores, a barbershop, a bank, and an opera hall.

The Knights of Columbus built the township hall in 1922.

== Geography ==
According to the United States Census Bureau, the city has a total area of 0.19 square miles (0.49 km^{2}), all land.

=== Climate ===
The climate in this area is characterized by hot, humid summers and generally mild to cool winters. According to the Köppen Climate Classification system, Damar has a humid subtropical climate, abbreviated "Cfa" on climate maps.

== Demographics ==
Historical population
Census	Pop.	Note	%±
1940	263		—
1950	305		16.0%
1960	361		18.4%
1970	245		−32.1%
1980	204		−16.7%
1990	112		−45.1%
2000	155		38.4%
2010	132		−14.8%
2020	112		−15.2%
U.S. Decennial Census

=== 2020 census ===
The 2020 United States census counted 112 people, 53 households, and 27 families in Damar. The population density was 586.4 per square mile (226.4/km^{2}). There were 79 housing units at an average density of 413.6 per square mile (159.7/km^{2}). The racial makeup was 91.96% (103) white or European American (91.07% non-Hispanic white), 0.0% (0) black or African-American, 0.0% (0) Native American or Alaska Native, 0.0% (0) Asian, 0.0% (0) Pacific Islander or Native Hawaiian, 0.0% (0) from other races, and 8.04% (9) from two or more races. Hispanic or Latino of any race was 0.89% (1) of the population.

Of the 53 households, 20.8% had children under the age of 18; 45.3% were married couples living together; 28.3% had a female householder with no spouse or partner present. 47.2% of households consisted of individuals and 22.6% had someone living alone who was 65 years of age or older. The average household size was 1.6 and the average family size was 2.2. The percent of those with a bachelor's degree or higher was estimated to be 37.5% of the population.

16.1% of the population was under the age of 18, 7.1% from 18 to 24, 18.8% from 25 to 44, 27.7% from 45 to 64, and 30.4% who were 65 years of age or older. The median age was 50.0 years. For every 100 females, there were 115.4 males. For every 100 females ages 18 and older, there were 113.6 males.

The 2016–2020 5-year American Community Survey estimates show that the median household income was $36,000 (with a margin of error of +/- $17,610) and the median family income was $60,000 (+/- $17,862). Males had a median income of $33,889 (+/- $17,688). The median income for those above 16 years old was $33,333 (+/- $6,477). Approximately, 8.0% of families and 12.2% of the population were below the poverty line, including 0.0% of those under the age of 18 and 17.4% of those ages 65 or over.

=== 2010 census ===
As of the census of 2010, there were 132 people, 58 households, and 34 families residing in the city. The population density was 694.7 inhabitants per square mile (268.2/km^{2}). There were 91 housing units at an average density of 478.9 per square mile (184.9/km^{2}). The racial makeup of the city was 97.7% White, 1.5% Asian, and 0.8% from two or more races.

There were 58 households, of which 29.3% had children under the age of 18 living with them, 51.7% were married couples living together, 3.4% had a female householder with no husband present, 3.4% had a male householder with no wife present, and 41.4% were non-families. 34.5% of all households were made up of individuals, and 18.9% had someone living alone who was 65 years of age or older. The average household size was 2.28 and the average family size was 2.97.

The median age in the city was 50 years. 23.5% of residents were under the age of 18; 7.5% were between the ages of 18 and 24; 14.3% were from 25 to 44; 34% were from 45 to 64; and 20.5% were 65 years of age or older. The gender makeup of the city was 46.2% male and 53.8% female.

== Parks and Recreation ==
- Webster Reservoir and Webster State Park

== Education ==
The community is served by Palco USD 269 public school district. It has two schools: Damar Elementary School is located in Damar, Palco Jr-Sr High School is located in Palco.

Damar High School was unified with Palco High School in 1974. The Damar High School mascot was the Antelope.
