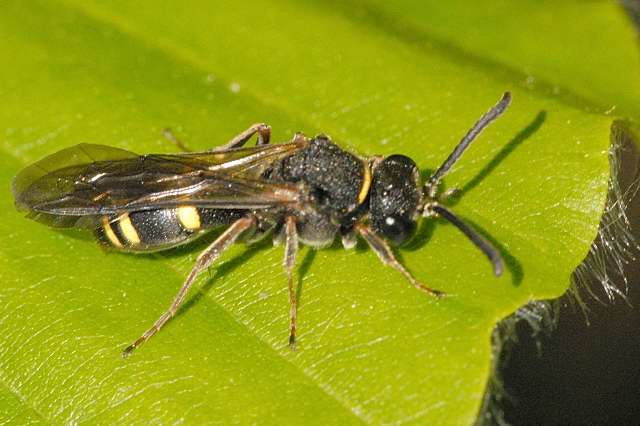
- Nysson spinosus

Scientific classification
- Domain: Eukaryota
- Kingdom: Animalia
- Phylum: Arthropoda
- Class: Insecta
- Order: Hymenoptera
- Family: Bembicidae
- Subfamily: Nyssoninae
- Tribe: Nyssonini

Genera
- Acanthostethus; Antomartinezius; Brachystegus; Cresson; Epinysson; Foxia; Heterogyna; Hovanysson; Hyponysson; Idionysson; Losada; Metanysson; Neonysson; Nippononysson; Nursea; Nysson; Perisson; Zanysson

= Nyssonini =

Tribe of wasps

The Nyssonini are a group of cleptoparasitic bembicine wasps generally distinguished by the petiolate second submarginal cell of the forewing and rather strongly sculptured head and mesosoma (a common trait in cleptoparasitic wasps). Most species also bear sharp propodeal projections and spiny hind tibiae. There are ~238 spp. in 18 genera worldwide.
