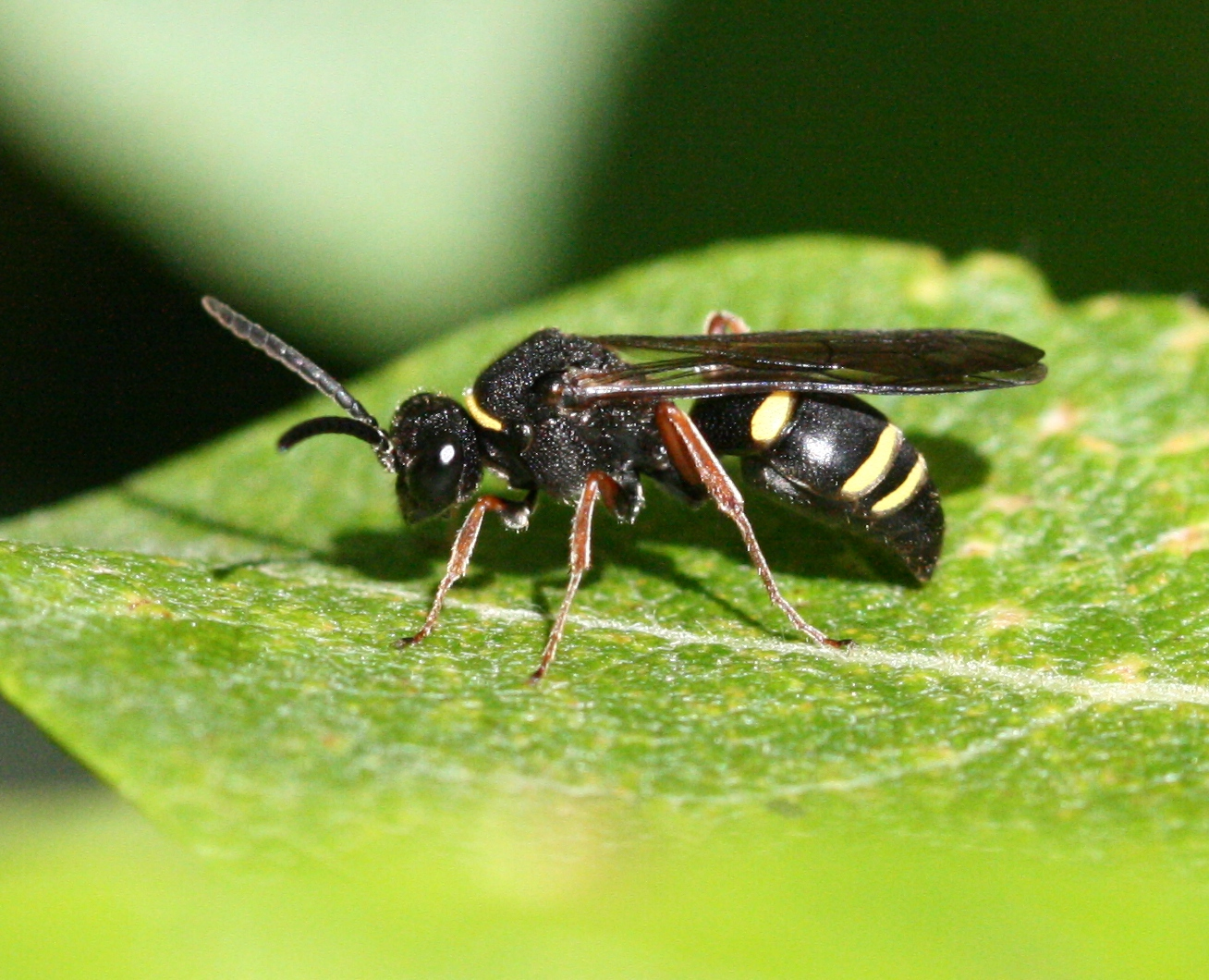
- Nysson spinosus female

Scientific classification
- Kingdom: Animalia
- Phylum: Arthropoda
- Class: Insecta
- Order: Hymenoptera
- Family: Bembicidae
- Tribe: Nyssonini
- Genus: Nysson; Latreille, 1802

Type species
- Sphex spinosus J. Forster, 1771

Species
- See text

= Nysson =

Genus of wasps

Nysson is a Holarctic genus of kleptoparasitic wasps in the family Bembicidae. Over 100 species are known.

== European species ==
- Nysson alicantinus Mercet 1909
- Nysson bohemicus Zavadil 1848
- Nysson castellanus Mercet 1909
- Nysson chevrieri Kohl 1879
- Nysson dimidiatus Jurine 1807
- Nysson dusmeti Mercet 1909
- Nysson fraternus Mercet 1909
- Nysson fulvipes A. Costa 1859
- Nysson ganglbaueri Kohl 1912
- Nysson gerstaeckeri Handlirsch 1887
- Nysson hrubanti Balthasar 1972
- Nysson ibericus Handlirsch 1895
- Nysson interruptus (Fabricius 1798)
- Nysson kolazyi Handlirsch 1887
- Nysson konowi Mercet 1909
- Nysson lapillus Beaumont 1965
- Nysson laufferi Mercet 1904
- Nysson maculosus (Gmelin 1790)
- Nysson miegi Mercet 1909
- Nysson mimulus Valkeila 1964
- Nysson niger Chevrier 1868
- Nysson parietalis Mercet 1909
- Nysson pratensis Mercet 1909
- Nysson pusillus Beaumont 1953
- Nysson quadriguttatus Spinola 1808
- Nysson roubali Zavadil 1937
- Nysson ruthenicus Birula 1912
- Nysson spinosus (J. Forster 1771)
- Nysson susterai Zavadil 1948
- Nysson tridens Gerstaecker 1867
- Nysson trimaculatus (Rossi 1790)
- Nysson varelai Mercet 1909
- Nysson variabilis Chevrier 1867
- Nysson decemmaculatus (Spinola 1808)
- Nysson epeoliformis (F. Smith 1856)
- Nysson militaris (Gerstaecker 1867)
- Nysson monachus (Mercet 1909)

== See also ==
- List of Nysson species
