= St. Patrick's Church (Bridgeport, Connecticut) =

Coordinates: 41°11′30.07″N 73°11′45.46″W

St. Patrick Church
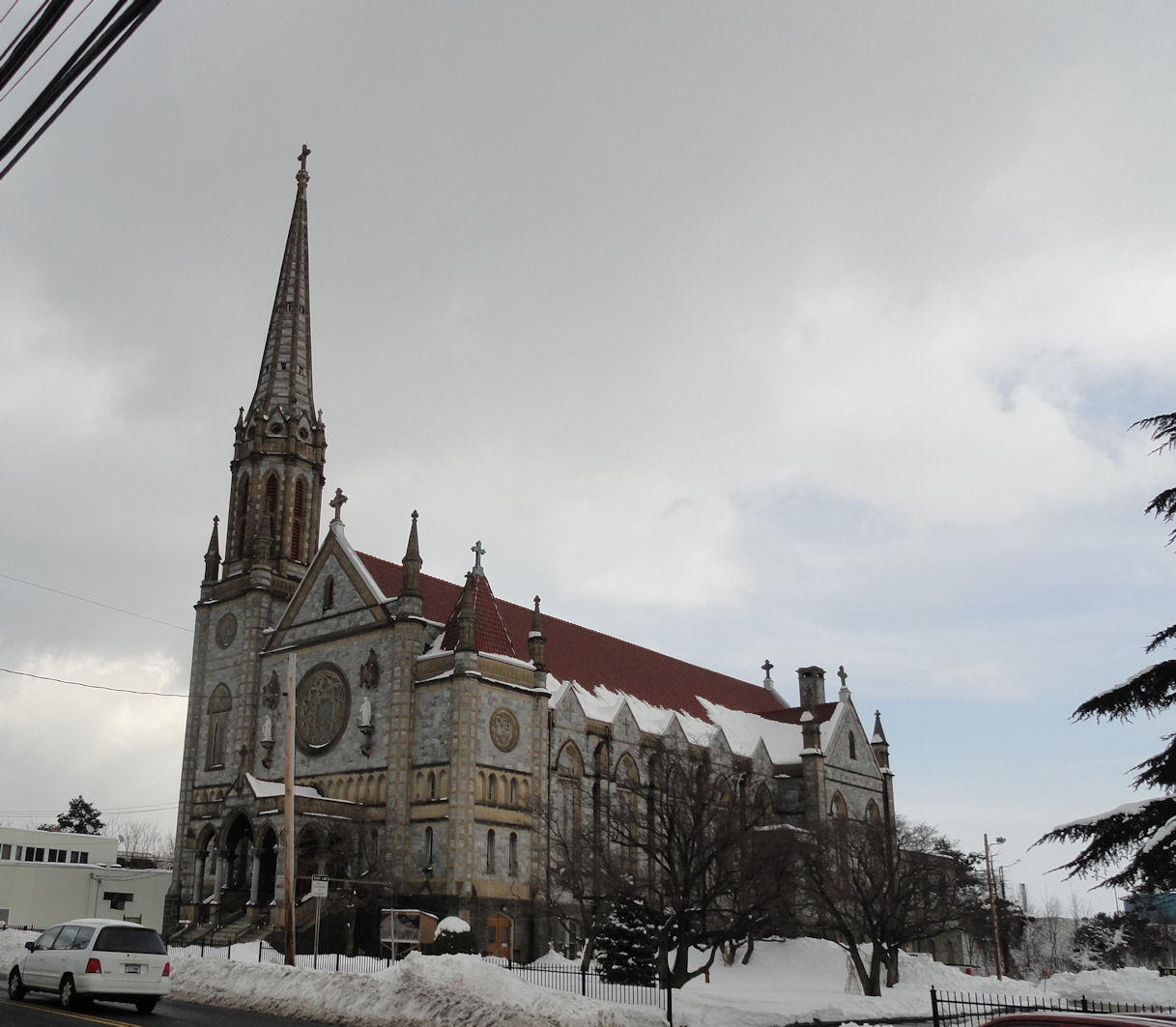
- St. Patrick Church, Bridgeport Connecticut; Dwyer and McMahon, architect 1910
- St. Patrick Church
- Location: 170 Thompson Street; Bridgeport, Connecticut
- Country: United States
- Denomination: Roman Catholic
- Website: https://www.thecathedralparish.org/

Architecture
- Architect(s): James Murphy; Dwyer and McMahon

Specifications
- Height: 168 ft (51 m)

Administration
- Province: Hartford
- Diocese: Bridgeport
- Parish: Roman Catholic

Clergy
- Bishop: Most Rev. Frank Caggiano
- Pastor: Very Rev. Arthur Mollenhauer

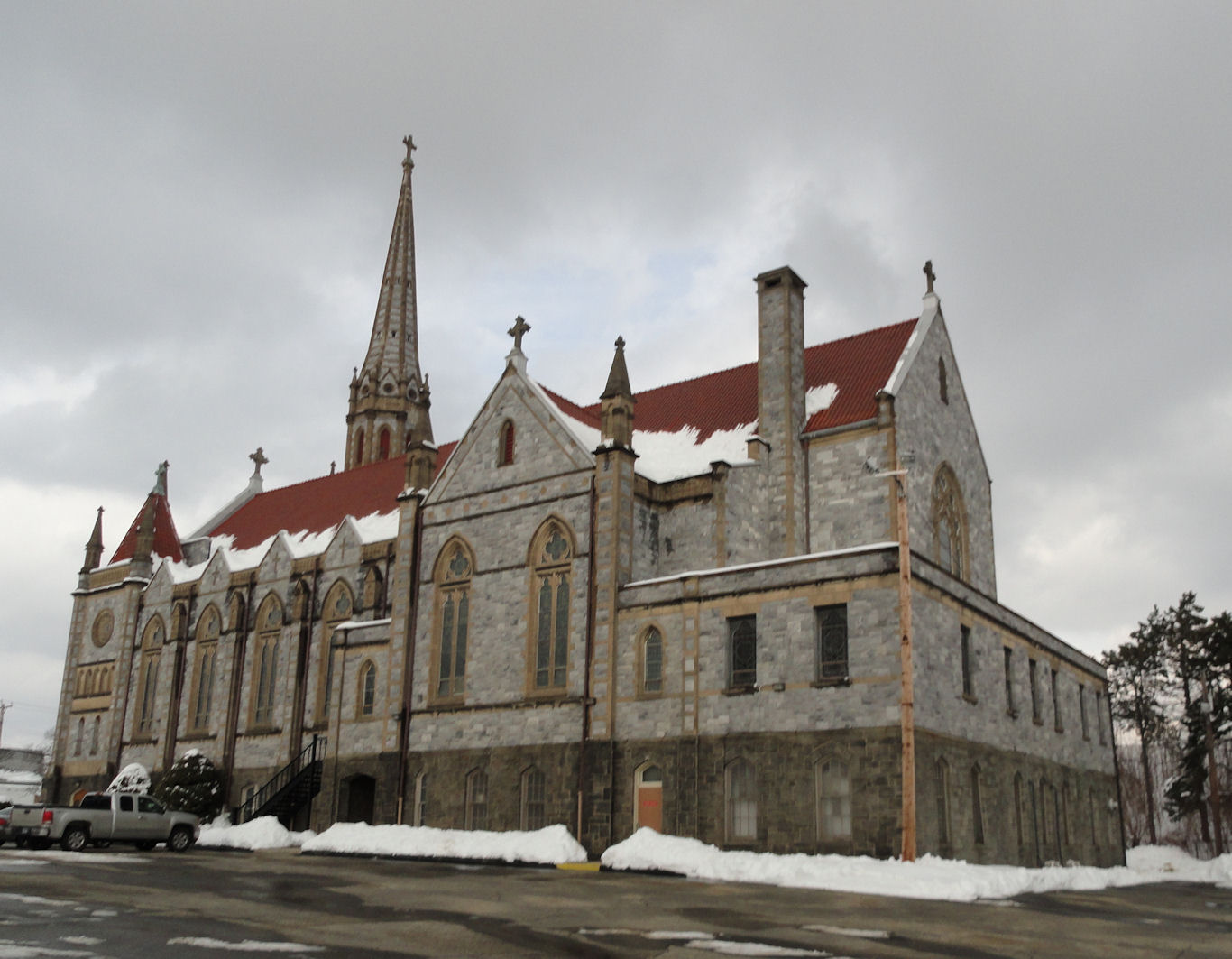
St. Patrick Church Bridgeport Connecticut as seen from behind.

St. Patrick Church is a Roman Catholic church in Bridgeport, Connecticut, part of the Diocese of Bridgeport.

== History ==
St. Patrick Church is first Catholic church in the North End of Bridgeport. The immense church makes quite an impression on unsuspecting motorists traveling on the Interstate highway close by. The parish was formed from the third division of the parish of St. Augustine's Cathedral.

== Building ==
After the parish's founding, masses were held for many years in a basement church designed by James Murphy or Providence, RI. Around 1910, the massive superstructure was added by Dwyer and McMahon of Hartford, CT.
