= Holy Trinity Church (Central Falls, Rhode Island) =

Historic church in Rhode Island, United States

- Holy Trinity Church Complex
- U.S. National Register of Historic Places
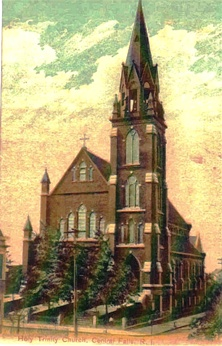
- Postcard of Holy Trinity Church

- Location within Rhode Island Location within the United States
- Location: Central Falls, Rhode Island
- Coordinates: 41°53′19″N 71°23′47″W
- Built: 1889
- Architect: James Murphy; Irving Gorman
- Architectural style: Gothic Revival
- MPS: Central Falls MRA (AD)
- NRHP reference No.: 78000073
- Added to NRHP: January 3, 1978

The Holy Trinity Church Complex is an historic church complex on 134 Fuller Avenue in Central Falls, Rhode Island.

== Description ==
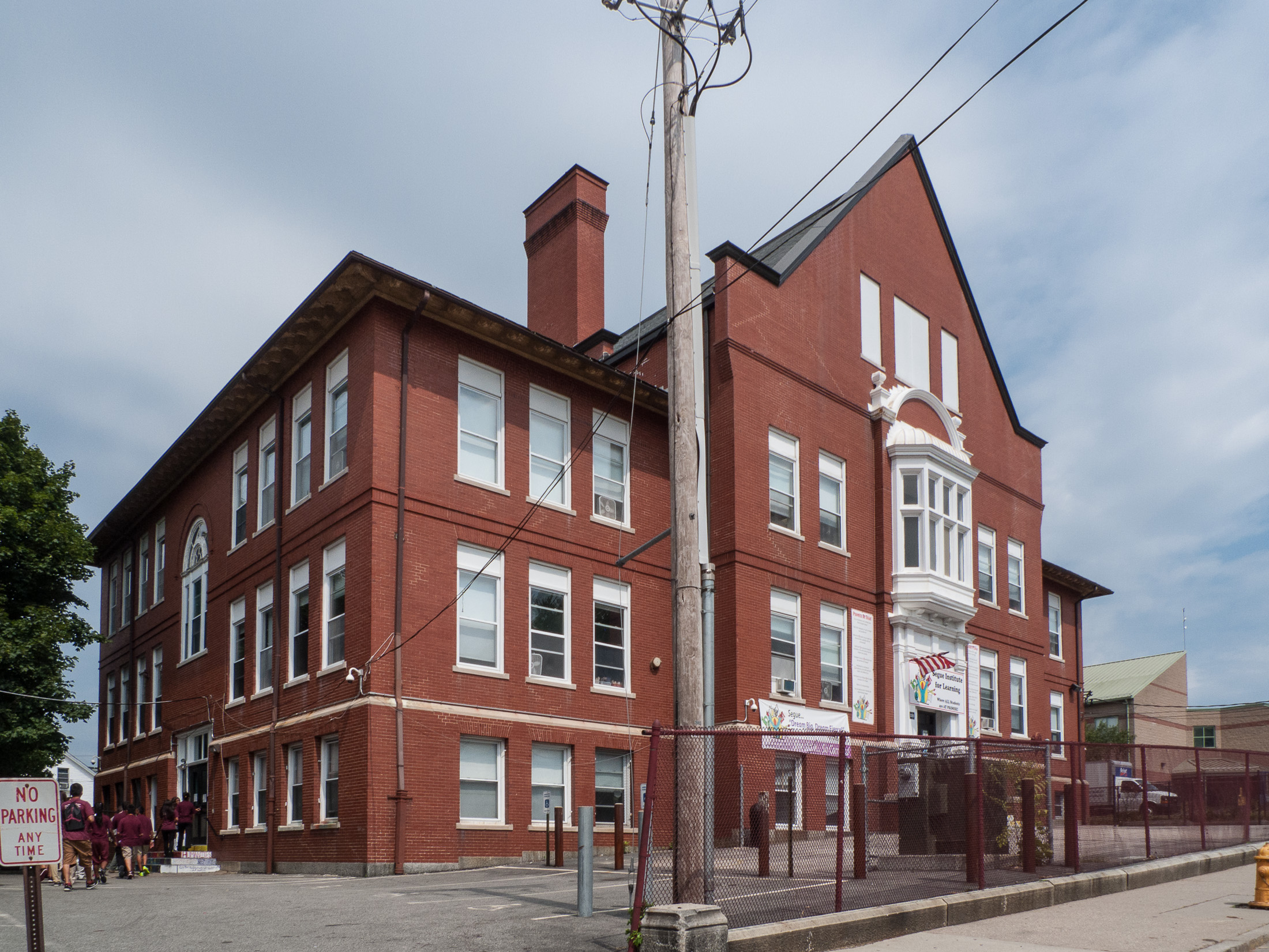
Former school of the Holy Trinity Church.

The church was a red brick structure built in 1889 to a design by James Murphy in a Gothic Revival style. The campus also includes other Murphy designs, including a rectory (1893), convent (1905), and school (1905), and a parish house designed by Irving Gorman and built in 1925. The complex was built by the Roman Catholic Church within the Diocese of Providence to serve the area's growing Irish immigrant community.

The complex was added to the National Register of Historic Places in 1978. The church has since been demolished, and its location is now occupied by Veterans Memorial Elementary School. The former parish school still stands at 325 Cowden Street as the Segue Institute for Learning.

== See also ==
- National Register of Historic Places listings in Providence County, Rhode Island
