= James Murphy (architect) =

Irish-American architect (1834–1907)

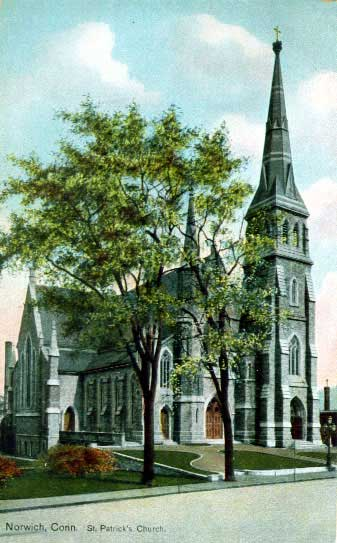
- St. Patrick's, Norwich (1873)
- Born: 1834; County Tipperary, Ireland
- Died: 1907 (aged 72–73); Cambridge, Massachusetts
- Known for: Architect of at least 45 catholic churches

James Murphy, FAIA, (1834–1907) was an Irish-American architect active in late-nineteenth- and early twentieth-century New England, who designed numerous Roman Catholic churches and related structures.

== Early life and career ==
Murphy was born in 1834 in County Tipperary, Ireland. In 1852, he emigrated to the United States along with his brother Michael. Soon after his arrival, he entered the Brooklyn, New York, firm of Patrick C. Keely as an apprentice. Keely was already an established architect specializing in ecclesiastical design. Eventually, Murphy became a partner in the firm, operating as Keely & Murphy. Murphy would later marry Keely's sister-in-law.

== Architectural practice ==
By the mid-1860s, the duo opened a branch office in Providence, Rhode Island. In 1875, the partnership was dissolved and Murphy established his own practice. Murphy continued to specialize in church design for the ever-growing number of Roman Catholic parishes during the late nineteenth century, particularly in the southern New England area of Massachusetts, Rhode Island, and Connecticut.

In the 1880s and 1890s, Murphy employed his nephew, Ambrose J. Murphy, who would later partner with Frank R. Hindle. Some time around 1900, Murphy established a new office in Boston, Massachusetts.

In 1870, Murphy joined the American Institute of Architects, and was elevated to Fellowship in 1885.

== Personal life ==
James Murphy married Patrick Charles Keely's sister-in-law. Murphy had a brother, Michael Murphy, with whom he emigrated to America. The architect, Ambrose J. Murphy, was his nephew. Murphy died April 18, 1907, at the Holy Ghost Hospital (Cambridge, Massachusetts) in Cambridge, Massachusetts.

== Legacy ==
Ambrose J. Murphy continued James Murphy's firm after 1907. He entered into partnership with Frank R. Hindle to form the firm of Murphy & Hindle, which practiced architecture in Rhode Island until the 1940s. That firm also specialized in church design.

== Architectural works ==
=== Churches ===
- 1862 - St. Bridget, 455 Plymouth St, Abington, Massachusetts
- 1864 - St. Gregory, 2223 Dorchester Ave, Dorchester, Massachusetts
  - Demolished
- 1864 - St. Mary, 540 Broadway, Providence, Rhode Island
- 1866 - St. Mary, 134 Norfolk St, Cambridge, Massachusetts
  - A Keely & Murphy project
- 1867 - St. John, 72 S Main St, Concord, New Hampshire
  - A Keely & Murphy project
- 1867 - St. Mary, 669 West Ave, Norwalk, Connecticut
- 1868 - Immaculate Conception, 11 Prospect St, Marlborough, Massachusetts
- 1868 - St. Michael, Prairie & Oxford, Providence, Rhode Island
  - Replaced in 1915, burned 1970s
- 1869 - Our Lady of Mercy, 500 Main St, East Greenwich, Rhode Island
  - Demolished
- 1869 - St. Bernard, 240 Water St, Fitchburg, Massachusetts
- 1870 - St. Joseph, 264 Washington St, Somerville, Massachusetts
- 1870 - St. Mary, 5 Hillhouse Ave, New Haven, Connecticut
- 1870 - St. Patrick, 7 East St, Whitinsville, Massachusetts
  - Demolished
- 1871 - Holy Trinity, 133 Main St, Greenfield, Massachusetts
- 1871 - St. John, 17 Chestnut St, Peabody, Massachusetts
- 1871 - St. John, 352 Atwells Ave, Providence, Rhode Island
  - Demolished in 1992
- 1872 - St. John, 63 Church St, Slatersville, Rhode Island
- 1873 - Our Lady Help of Christians, 573 Washington St, Newton, Massachusetts
- 1873 - St. John, 279 Atlantic St, Stamford, Connecticut
- 1873 - St. Patrick, 213 Broadway, Norwich, Connecticut
  - Cathedral status in 1952
- 1874 - Sacred Heart of Jesus, 166 Cross St, Gardner, Massachusetts
  - Burned in 1889
- 1875 - Notre Dame du Sacre Coeur, 222 E Main St, North Adams, Massachusetts
- 1875 - St. Joseph, 115 Union St, Lynn, Massachusetts
- 1878 - St. Mary, 90 7th St, Turners Falls, Massachusetts
- 1880 - St. Patrick, Main & Park, Williamstown, Massachusetts
  - Demolished
- 1881 - St. Francis, 318 Church St, Naugatuck, Connecticut
- 1881 - St. Mary, 30 Bartlett St, Westfield, Massachusetts
- 1881 - St. Thomas, 2 E Main St, Huntington, Massachusetts
- 1882 - St. Mary, 239 Greenwood Ave, Bethel, Connecticut
- 1885 - St. Louis, 440 Bradford Ave, Fall River, Massachusetts
  - Demolished in 2010
- 1885 - St. Mary, 103 Pine St, Pawtucket, Rhode Island
- 1888 - Holy Rosary, Mosher & West, Holyoke, Massachusetts
  - Demolished
- 1888 - Sacred Heart, 387 Chestnut St, Springfield, Massachusetts
- 1889 - Holy Trinity, 134 Fuller Ave, Central Falls, Rhode Island
  - Demolished
- 1889 - St. Edward, 997 Branch Ave, Wanskuck, Rhode Island
- 1889 - St. Margaret, 1098 Pawtucket Ave, Rumford, Rhode Island
  - Burned in 1988
- 1889 - St. Patrick, 170 Thompson St, Bridgeport, Connecticut
  - Completed by Dwyer & McMahon in 1910
- 1890 - St. Joseph's, 1303 Mendon Rd, Ashton, Rhode Island
- 1890 - St. Patrick, 220 Bates St, Lewiston, Maine
- 1892 - St. Edward, 458 Main St, Medfield, Massachusetts
  - Demolished
- 1892 - St. Patrick, 46 E Central St, Natick, Massachusetts
- 1896 - Holy Name, 99 Camp St, Providence, Rhode Island
- 1896 - St. Mary, 17 Waterville St, North Grafton, Massachusetts
  - Burned in 1948
- 1896 - St. Thomas, Columbia St, Adams, Massachusetts
- 1902 - St. Peter, 16 Russell St, Great Barrington, Massachusetts

=== Other buildings ===
- 1872 - St. John Rectory, 63 Church St, Slatersville, Rhode Island
- 1881 - St. Michael Hall and School, 260 State St, Springfield, Massachusetts
  - Demolished
- 1883 - St. Bernard Rectory, 240 Water St., Fitchburg, Massachusetts
- 1898 - Tyler School, Plain & Maple, Providence, Rhode Island
  - The cathedral school, demolished

== See also ==
- Patrick W. Ford, a contemporary church architect.
