= Sacred Heart Church, Rectory, School and Convent (Cambridge, Massachusetts) =

Historic church in Massachusetts, United States

- U.S. National Register of Historic Places
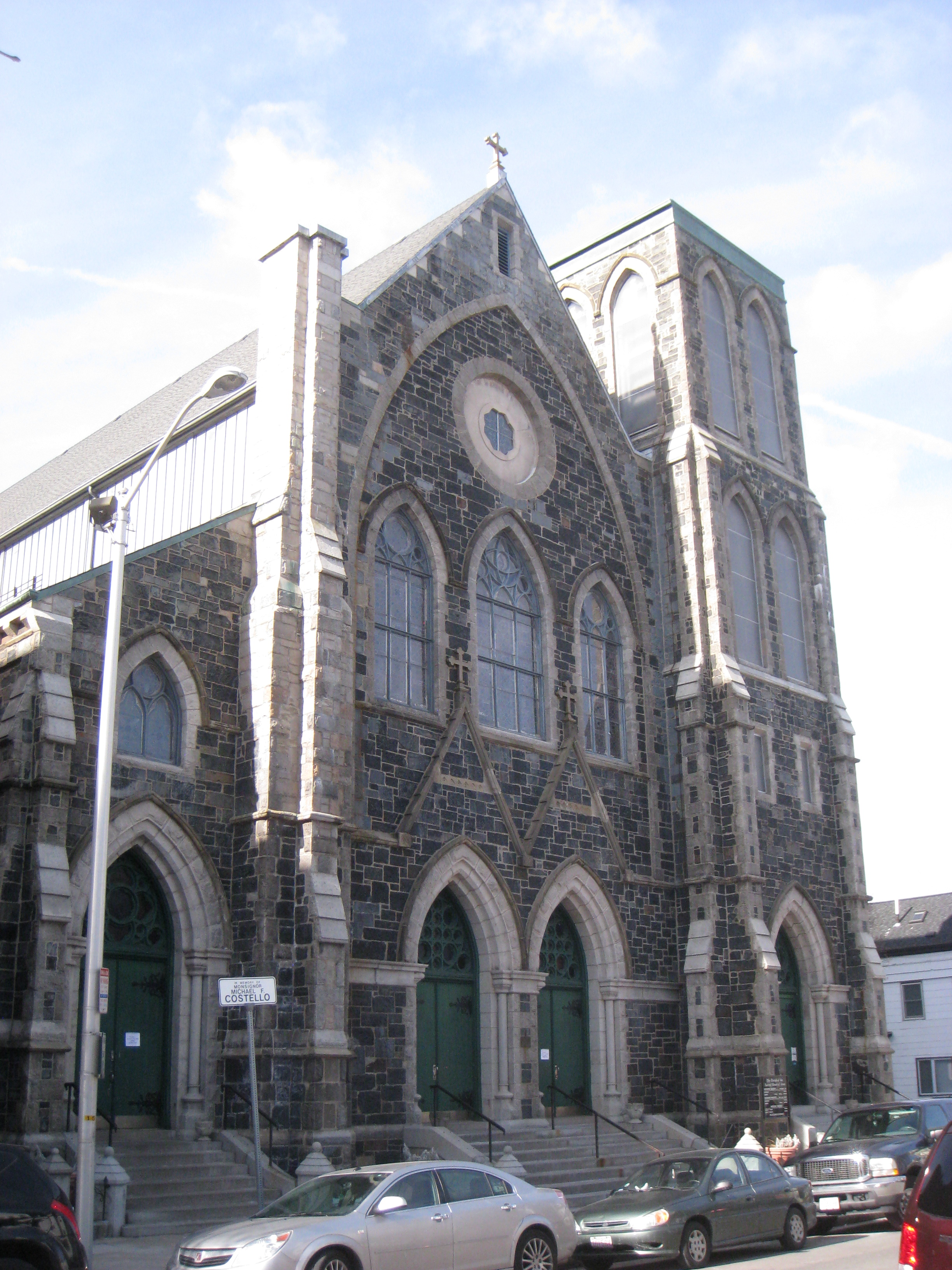

- Location within Massachusetts Location within the United States
- Location: 47 6th St., Cambridge, Massachusetts
- Coordinates: 42°22′14.5″N 71°5′7.5″W
- Built: 1874 - 1883
- Architect: Patrick W. Ford; Peter Paul Pugin
- Architectural style: Late Gothic Revival
- MPS: Cambridge MRA
- NRHP reference No.: 82001974
- Added to NRHP: April 13, 1982

The Sacred Heart Church, Rectory, School and Convent make up a historic Roman Catholic church complex in Cambridge, Massachusetts. The church was built in the 1870s and 1880s to serve the parish first organized as the St. John the Evangelist Parish in 1842. The cornerstone of the church was laid on 4 October 1874. It was dedicated in 1883, and opened for Divine Service on 12 November 1876. The rectory was added in 1885, and the convent and school followed in 1902. The church is a Medieval Gothic structure designed by P. W. Ford. The complex occupies an entire city block, and has been partly taken over for Cambridge city school administration.

The complex was listed on the National Register of Historic Places on 13 April 1982; #387395.

== Brief history ==
Under the pastorate of Msgr. John O'Brien the cornerstone of Sacred Heart Church was laid on October 4, 1874 by Archbishop John Joseph Williams. Later Bishop of Portland, Maine, James Augustine Healy, then pastor of St. James in Boston delivered the sermon. The basement of the church opened for services on November 12, 1876.

Sacred Heart Church was dedicated on January 28, 1883.

On June 29, 1963 the church structure suffered a fire. During the fire the roof and most of the original windows were destroyed.

== Sacred Heart Review ==
Under the direction of Rev. John O'Brien a parish periodical is assembled, the first issue being published on December 1, 1888. This small periodical would ultimately grow to received national subscribership and maintain a printing office in the parish neighborhood. The Sacred Heart Review ceased publication in 1918 after 1,547 issues, now catalogued by the Boston College Libraries.

== See also ==
- St. John the Evangelist Church (Cambridge, Massachusetts)
- National Register of Historic Places listings in Cambridge, Massachusetts
- Some Aspects of the East Cambridge Story
