= St. Joseph Church (Danbury, Connecticut) =

Coordinates: 41°24′04.18″N 73°27′33.90″W

- St. Joseph Church
- Location: 8 Robinson Avenue; Danbury, Connecticut
- Country: United States
- Denomination: Roman Catholic

Architecture
- Architect: Dwyer and McMahon

Administration
- Province: Hartford
- Diocese: Bridgeport

Clergy
- Bishop: Most Reverend Frank J. Caggiano
- Vicar: Reverend David W. Franklin
- Pastor: Reverend Samuel V. Scott

St. Joseph is a Roman Catholic church in Danbury, Connecticut, part of the Diocese of Bridgeport.

== History ==
In the 1850s, the only Catholic parish in Danbury was St. Peter's. In 1870, the Church of St. Peter, a large Gothic revival building was erected on South Main St, about a half mile from the present St. Joseph Church .

Over the next 50 years Danbury's Catholic population had increased to the point where St. Peter Church was not large enough to accommodate the number of faithful wishing to attend mass. In 1905, Bishop Michael Tierney of Hartford established St. Joseph Parish to help with the overcrowding. Fr. John D. Kennedy was the first pastor.

Saint Joseph Parish School was opened on September 7, 1924, and staffed by seven Sisters of Mercy. As of 1975, the school has operated with a lay staff.

The McGivney Council No. 29 of the Knights of Columbus is based at St. Joseph Catholic Church. Its territory covers eight Catholic parishes in the Danbury area.

== Architecture ==
The substantial Romanesque Revival-style church is located in Downtown Danbury. It was designed by the noted church architects Dwyer and McMahon of Hartford, Connecticut. A rose window in the east façade depicts St. Cecilia, patron of music. The window is twelve feet in diameter and directly above the triple arched entrance.

St. Joseph Church
- Interactive map of the St. Joseph Church area

General information
- Architectural style: Romanesque Revival
- Location: Danbury, Connecticut, United States of America
- Client: The Roman Catholic Diocese of Bridgeport

Design and construction
- Architect: Dwyer & McMahon of Hartford, Connecticut

== Music ==
St. Joseph is home to an Austin Organ, opus 2176, two manuals and 30 ranks.
