= Saint Mary Church (Bethel, Connecticut) =

Coordinates: 41°22′32.34″N 73°23′13.97″W

St. Mary Church
- St. Mary Church
- Location: 26 Dodgingtown Road; Bethel, Connecticut
- Country: United States
- Denomination: Roman Catholic

Architecture
- Architect(s): James Murphy original building Warren and Comacchini 1992 building

Administration
- Province: Hartford
- Diocese: Bridgeport

Clergy
- Bishop: Most Rev. William E. Lori

St. Mary is a Roman Catholic church in Bethel, Connecticut, part of the Diocese of Bridgeport.

== History ==
St. Mary was founded by Irish immigrants in 1882. The first St. Mary Church was designed shortly thereafter by well known church architect James Murphy of Providence RI. Over time it became evident that size of the church was not adequate for the needs of the parish and in 1992 the building was replaced by a larger, modern church designed by Warren and Comacchini of New York.

== Religious Education ==
The church focuses on welcoming and encouraging parents to help their children in their faith and states that children of the parish should attend formal religious education to prepare them for their Sacraments of Initiation.
