= St. Mary's Catholic Church (Winchester, Massachusetts) =

Historic church in Massachusetts, United States

- U.S. National Register of Historic Places
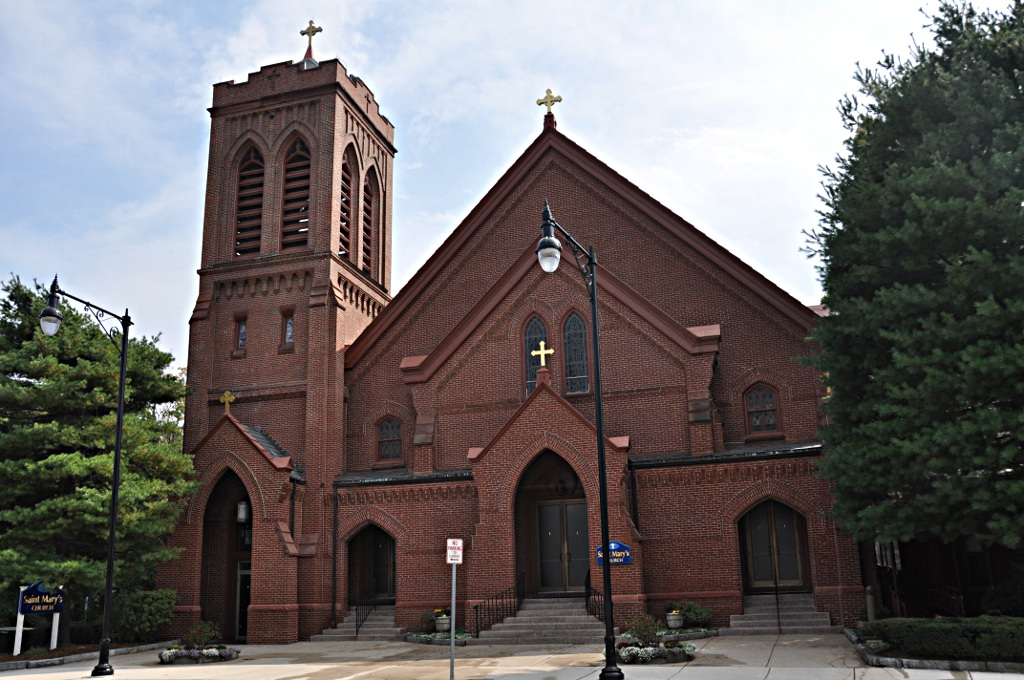

- Location within Massachusetts Location within the United States
- Location: Winchester, Massachusetts
- Coordinates: 42°27′15″N 71°7′57″W
- Built: 1876
- Architect: Ford, Patrick W.
- Architectural style: Gothic Revival
- MPS: Winchester MRA
- NRHP reference No.: 89000625
- Added to NRHP: July 5, 1989

St. Mary's Catholic Church is a parish church of the Catholic Church in Winchester, Massachusetts, within the Archdiocese of Boston. It is noted for its historic church at 159 Washington Street, which was listed on the National Register of Historic Places in 1989, reflecting its important role among the local Irish Catholic community. The parish also operates St. Mary's Early Learning Center, a preschool and kindergarten, the successor to St. Mary’s School, a parochial school which operated until 2020.

== Architecture ==
St. Mary's is located at the southeast corner of Washington and Bridge Streets, just northeast of Winchester center. The church building was built in 1876, replacing Winchester's first Roman Catholic place of worship, a chapel built on the same site in 1874. The area at the time was a center of a growing Irish-American population.

Originally clad in wood, this church underwent major renovations in 1897 under the direction of architect Patrick W. Ford, a noted area designer of churches, at which time it was clad in brick. It resembles older Federal period New England churches, with the nave set parallel to the roof gable. The building is richly decorated, with corbelled cornices and decorative buttresses. The square tower is offset at the northwestern corner, with a Gothic-arched entrance and a belfry with louvered pairs of Gothic-arched openings. A small baptistry and meeting, added c. 1900 to originally house a library, stands just south of the main building.

== History ==
Jerome B. Judkins, a prominent early resident, relocated to what became Winchester in the 1840s, and purchased many acres from what had been the old Caleb Swan farm. His house would later serve as rectory, convent, and parish center for the Catholic community. A small wooden chapel was built around 1874, the first permanent Catholic place of worship in town, as a mission church (Note: A mission church is an outlying non-parish church, similar to a chapel of ease, established to reach those for whom the parish church would be inaccessible; it is directly supported by the parish or diocese.) of the parish of St. Charles Borromeo in Woburn.

St. Mary's was erected as an independent parish in 1876, with Rev. Cornelius O'Connor appointed the first resident pastor. O'Connor had the chapel enlarged and took up residence at Bridge and Washington Streets. In 1882, his successor, Rev. Patrick J. Daly, enlarged the church to its current size and had a tower constructed. In 1888, the parish acquired two parcels of land, including the present site of the school, and in 1894, the stained-glass windows, organ, and parish library were installed. The church's exterior was encased in brick in 1896–97 by Boston architect P. W. Ford.

St. Mary's School opened in October 1914, blessed by the archbishop, William Cardinal O'Connell. It was staffed by the Sisters of St. Joseph until 1973. Amidst falling enrollments and pressures relating to the COVID-19 pandemic, grades one through five were closed in 2020, and the school has since operated as a preschool and kindergarten. St. Mary's also operated a high school for girls from 1922 to 1950.

With a priest shortage projected, plans began in the 1990s for the Winchester parishes to cluster operations. In May 2004, Archbishop O'Malley announced the closure of 65 parishes in the archdiocese. St. Joseph's, formerly at 100 Washington Street in Woburn, and Immaculate Conception, formerly at 12 Sheridan Circle in Winchester (which had been formed from part of St. Mary's in 1931), were consequently merged with the parish of St. Mary. The parish also shares a pastor with nearby St. Eulalia, at 50 Ridge Street in Winchester.

== See also ==
- National Register of Historic Places listings in Winchester, Massachusetts
