= Patrick W. Ford =

American architect

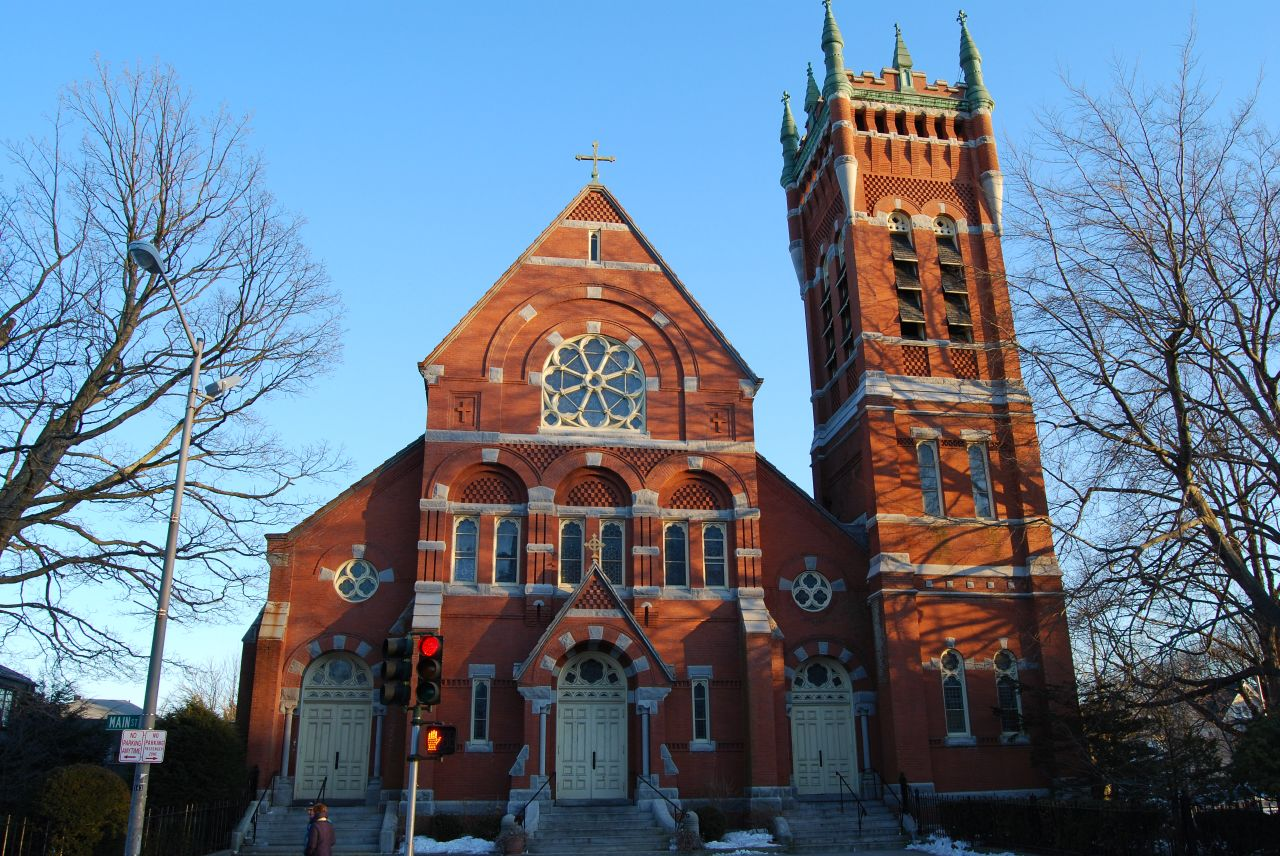
St Peter Church, Worcester Massachusetts

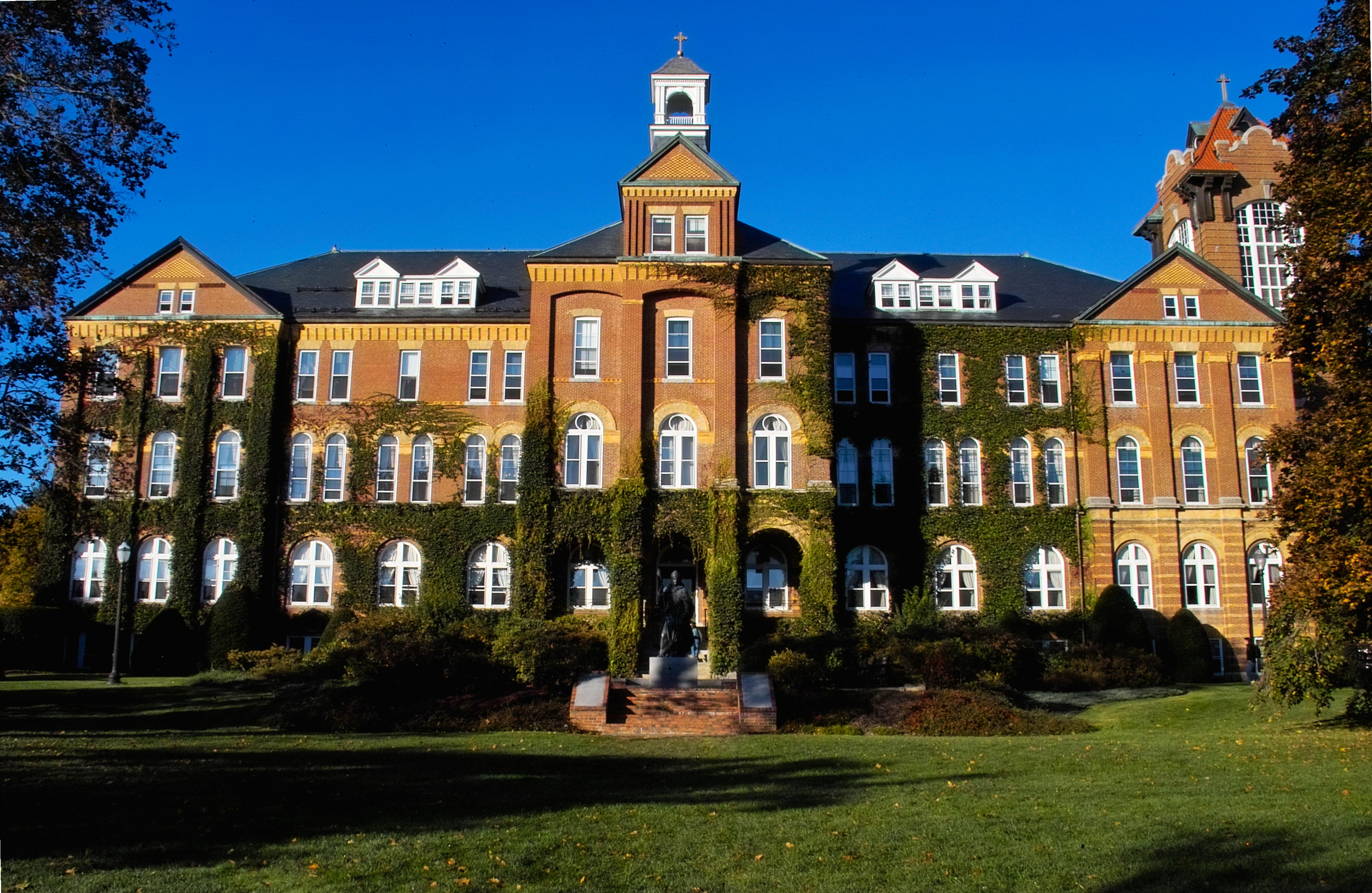
Saint Anselm College's Alumni Hall - 1889

Patrick W. Ford (1847–1900) was an Irish-American architect who, along with Patrick C. Keely of Brooklyn and James Murphy of Providence, Rhode Island designed many Roman Catholic churches built in the eastern part of United States through the latter half of the 19th century.

He was born in Ballincollig, Ireland, and educated at Queen's College Cork, Ford emigrated to the United States in 1866. He briefly lived in New York where he may have worked in the office of Patrick C. Keely, and then went to work for architects E. Boyden & Son in Worcester, Massachusetts.

In 1872 Ford moved to Boston and opened his own practice. He was widely recognized as an authority on church architecture and his practice focused primarily on designing churches and institutional buildings for the Roman Catholic Church in New England. His home was at 48 Peter Parley Road in the Jamaica Plain section of Boston. His house had an amazing stained glass window by the artist John Lafarge (now housed in the Corning Glass Museum). Ford died suddenly at age 52 in August 1900.

== Works ==
(partial list)

- Saint Mary's Church, Holliston, Massachusetts
- Sacred Heart Church, Roslindale, Massachusetts
- St. Gregory Church, Dorchester, Massachusetts (1895 redesign of original church by James Murphy)
- Sacred Heart Church, Rectory, School and Convent, Cambridge, Massachusetts
- St. Mary's Church, Dedham, Massachusetts
- St. James Church, Haverhill, Massachusetts
- Gate of Heaven Church, South Boston, Massachusetts
- St. Peter Church, South Boston, Massachusetts
- St. Patrick's Church, Watertown, Massachusetts
- St. Mary Church, Everett, Massachusetts
- St. Brendan Church, Bellingham, Massachusetts
- L'Église Saint Jean Baptiste (St. John the Baptist Church), Lowell, Massachusetts
- St. Augustine Church, Andover, Massachusetts
- St. Mary Church, Winchester, Massachusetts
- St. John the Evangelist Church, Clinton, Massachusetts
- St. Peter's Church, Worcester, MA
- Saint Anselm College, Goffstown, NH
- St. Dominic Church, Portland, ME
- St. Mary of the Assumption Church Northampton, Massachusetts
- St. James Church, New Bedford, MA (altered by Maginnis and Walsh)
- 1875 alteration to Fenwick Hall, College of the Holy Cross, Worcester, Massachusetts
- Sacred Heart of Jesus Church, Worcester, Massachusetts
- Sacred Heart Church, Holyoke, Massachusetts
- Notre Dame Church, Pittsfield, Massachusetts
- All Saints Church, Ware, Massachusetts
- 1880 Sacred Heart Mission Church, Newfields, New Hampshire

=== No longer extant ===
- St. Philip's Church, Boston, Massachusetts (burned)
- St. Brigid's Church, Lexington, Massachusetts (burned)
- Immaculate Conception Church, Revere, Massachusetts (demolished)
- St. Anne Church, Worcester, Massachusetts (demolished)
- St. Rose of Lima Church, Northborough, Massachusetts (burned)
- St. Stephen Church, Framingham, Massachusetts (demolished)
- Our Lady of the Rosary Church, South Boston, Massachusetts (demolished)
- St. Michael Church, Exeter, NH (demolished)

=== Attributed to Ford ===
- Our Lady of the Rosary Church, Spencer, Massachusetts

== Gallery ==
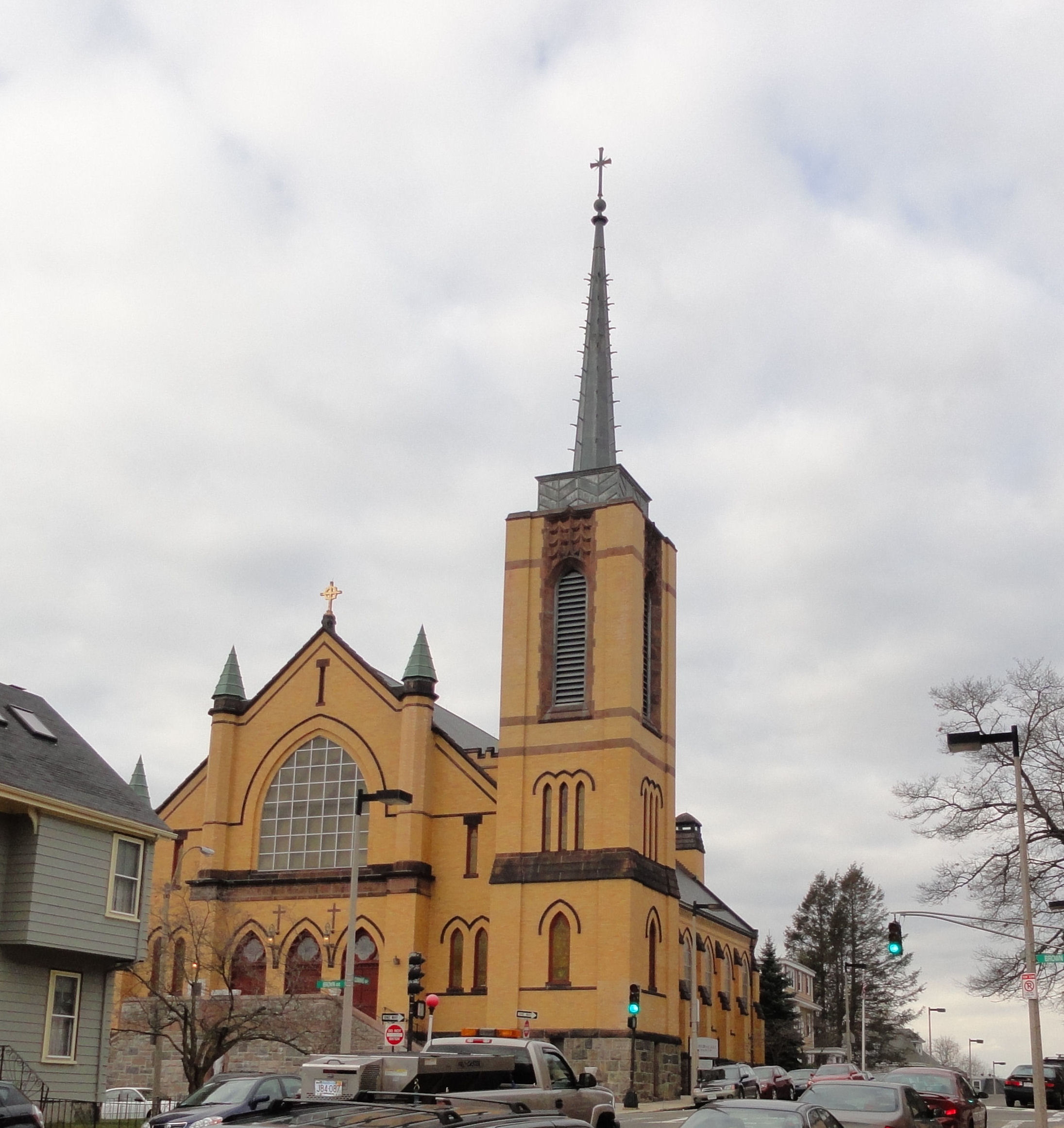
Sacred Heart Church, Roslindale, MA

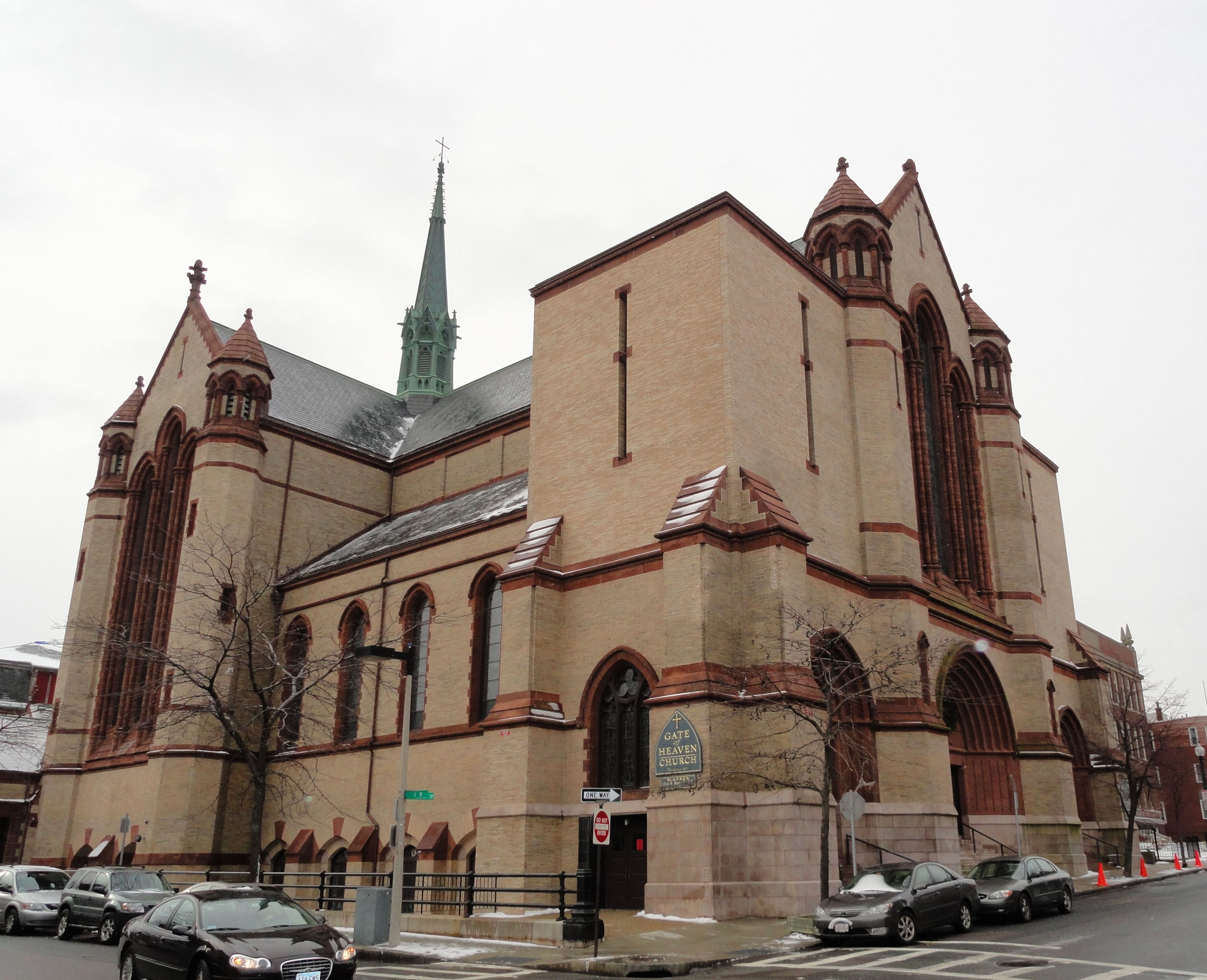
Gate of Heaven Church, South Boston, MA

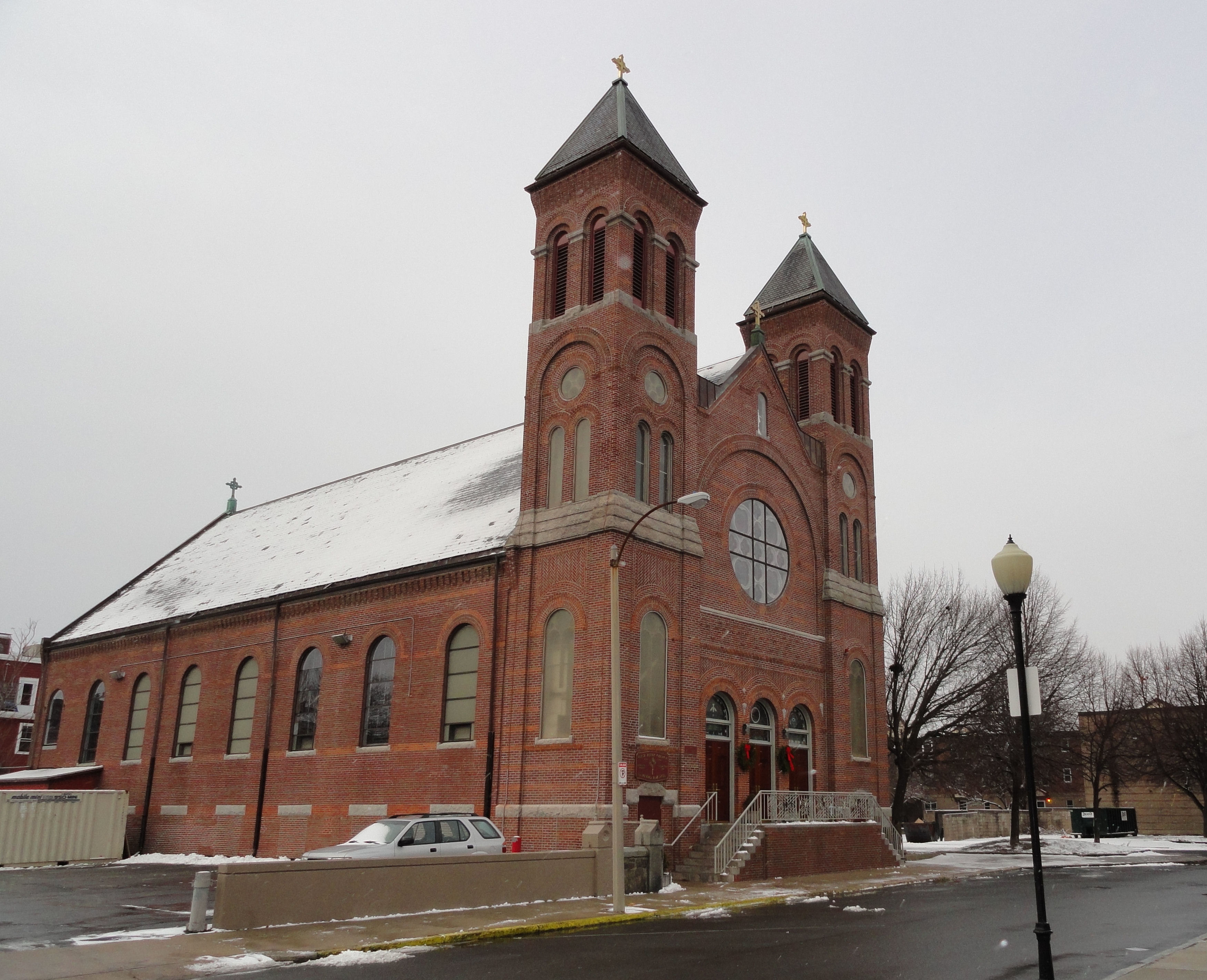
St. Peter Church, South Boston, MA

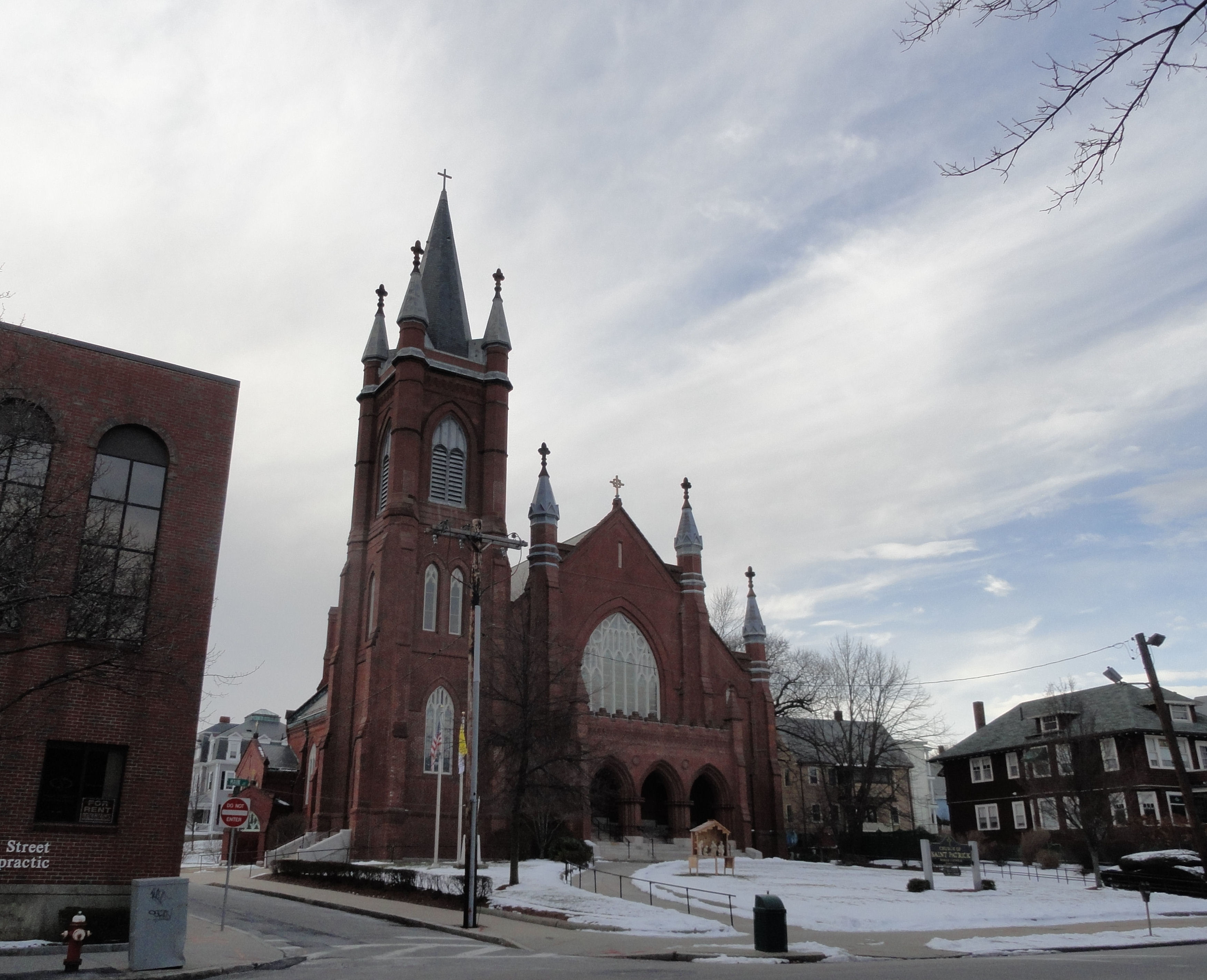
St. Patrick Church, Watertown MA
