= Our Lady Help of Christians Historic District (Newton, Massachusetts) =

Historic district in Massachusetts, United States

- U.S. National Register of Historic Places
- U.S. Historic district
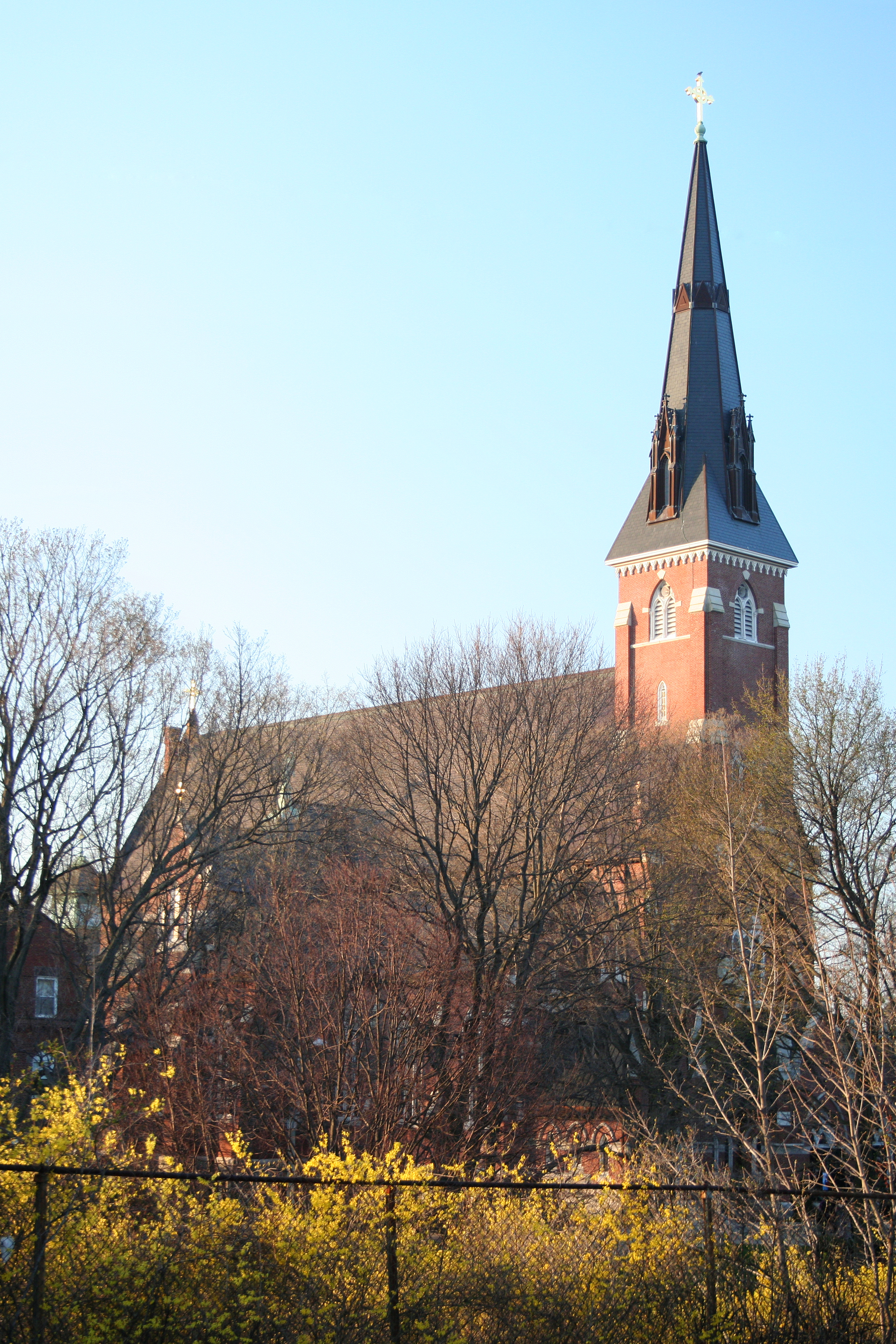

- Location within Massachusetts Location within the United States
- Location: Newton, Massachusetts
- Coordinates: 42°21′19″N 71°11′53″W
- Area: 6.6 acres (2.7 ha)
- Architect: James Murphy; J.W. Wentworth
- Architectural style: Gothic
- MPS: Newton MRA
- NRHP reference No.: 86001758
- Added to NRHP: September 4, 1986

Our Lady Help of Christians Historic District encompasses a complex of Catholic buildings in the Nonantum village of Newton, Massachusetts. It includes four examples of brick Gothic Revival architecture: the church, convent, and rectory, as well as Trinity Catholic High School. The first three buildings were designed by noted ecclesiastical architect James Murphy, and were built between 1873 and 1890. The high school was built in 1924, also in the Gothic Revival style. The district was added to the National Register of Historic Places in 1986.

== Description and history ==
Our Lady Help of Christians is located on a large parcel at the northwest corner of Washington and Adams Streets, just north of the Massachusetts Turnpike. The church is located nearest this corner, oriented south toward Washington Street. The rectory is located to its west, and the convent to its north. The school complex extends northward from Washington Street, to the left of the rectory and behind the convent, with the 1924 high school building at the front, and a 1960 elementary school at the rear.

The congregation was founded in 1872, and was originally known as St. Brendan's. It was established to cater to the growing Irish Catholic population in the Nonantum/Newton Corner area. The church was designed by Providence-based ecclesiastical architect James Murphy, and construction took two years (1873–75), hampered by funding difficulties and the death in a fall of its principal brickworker. Due to defects in the construction, the building underwent a major renovation in 1900 that added further supports to the walls, as well as the facade with three Gothic porches. The rectory, also a Murphy design, was added in then 1880s

The first convent was built on the site in 1890, replaced just three years later by the present Colonial Revival structure. A three-story elementary school was built in 1892-93 (demolished in 1960), with the high school following in 1924. The present elementary school building was built about the same time the old one was demolished. The high school closed in 2012, and the space is now occupied by a secular private school. The elementary school building now houses the Newton School for Children, a private preschool and day care center.

The church is home to the tallest steeple in Newton at 197 feet.

== See also ==
- List of churches in the Roman Catholic Archdiocese of Boston
- National Register of Historic Places listings in Newton, Massachusetts
