= St. Louis Church (Fall River, Massachusetts) =

Historic church in Massachusetts, United States

- U.S. National Register of Historic Places
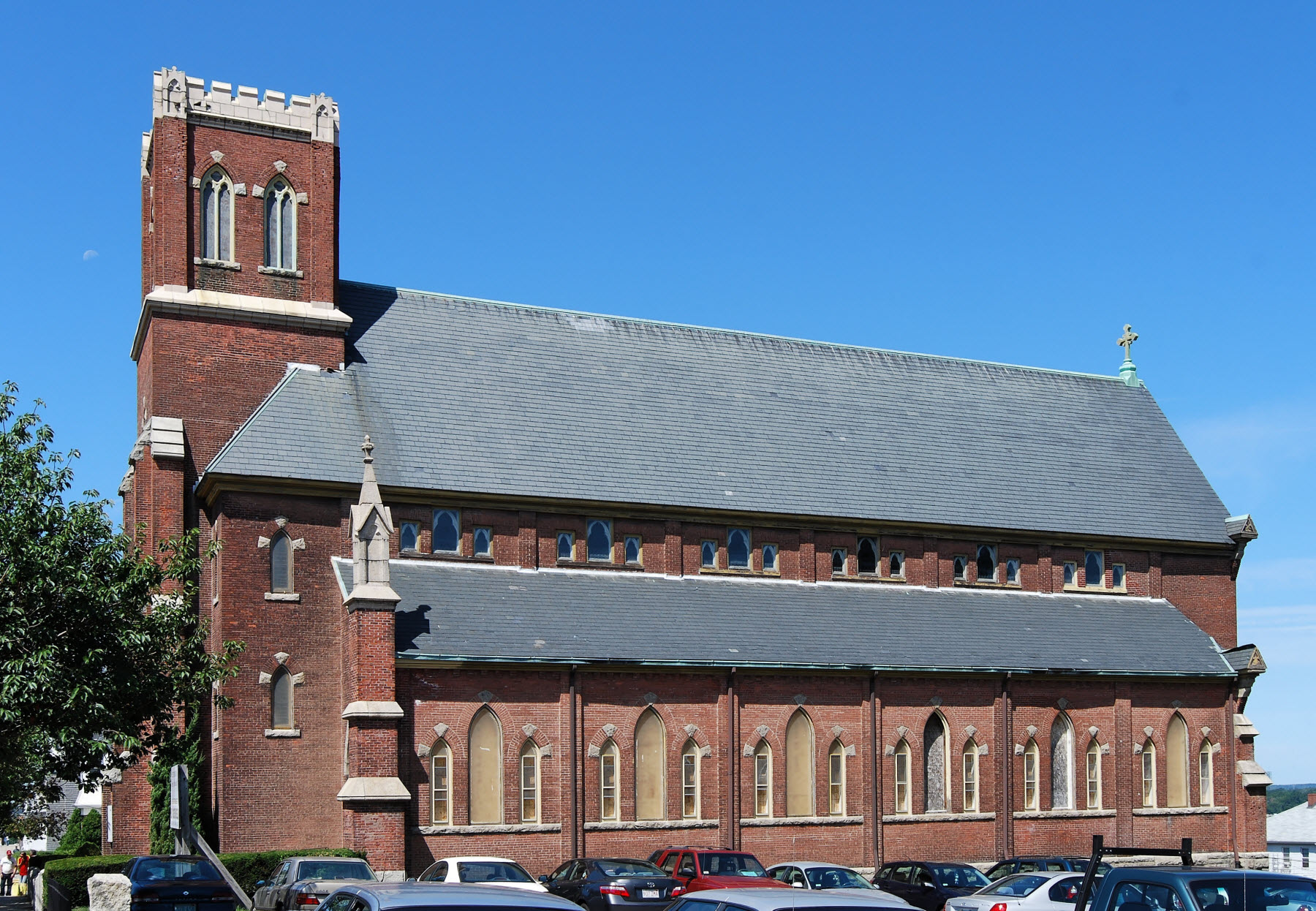
- 2008 photo of St. Louis Church (since demolished)

- Location within Massachusetts Location within the United States
- Location: Fall River, Massachusetts
- Coordinates: 41°41′47″N 71°10′2″W
- Built: 1885
- Architect: James Murphy
- Architectural style: Gothic Revival
- MPS: Fall River MRA
- NRHP reference No.: 83000722
- Added to NRHP: February 16, 1983

St. Louis Church was a historic former Roman Catholic church, located at 440 Bradford Avenue in Fall River, Massachusetts. The Gothic Revival church was built in 1885 to the designs of James Murphy. It was added to the National Register of Historic Places in 1983. The Diocese of Fall River closed the parish in 2001, and the records were transferred to St. Mary's Cathedral (Cathedral of Saint Mary of the Assumption).

The church was demolished in April 2010 for a cultural center that has yet to be built.

== See also ==
- National Register of Historic Places listings in Fall River, Massachusetts
