= St. Peters Catholic Church (Worcester, Massachusetts) =

Historic church in Massachusetts, United States

- St. Peter's Catholic Church
- U.S. National Register of Historic Places
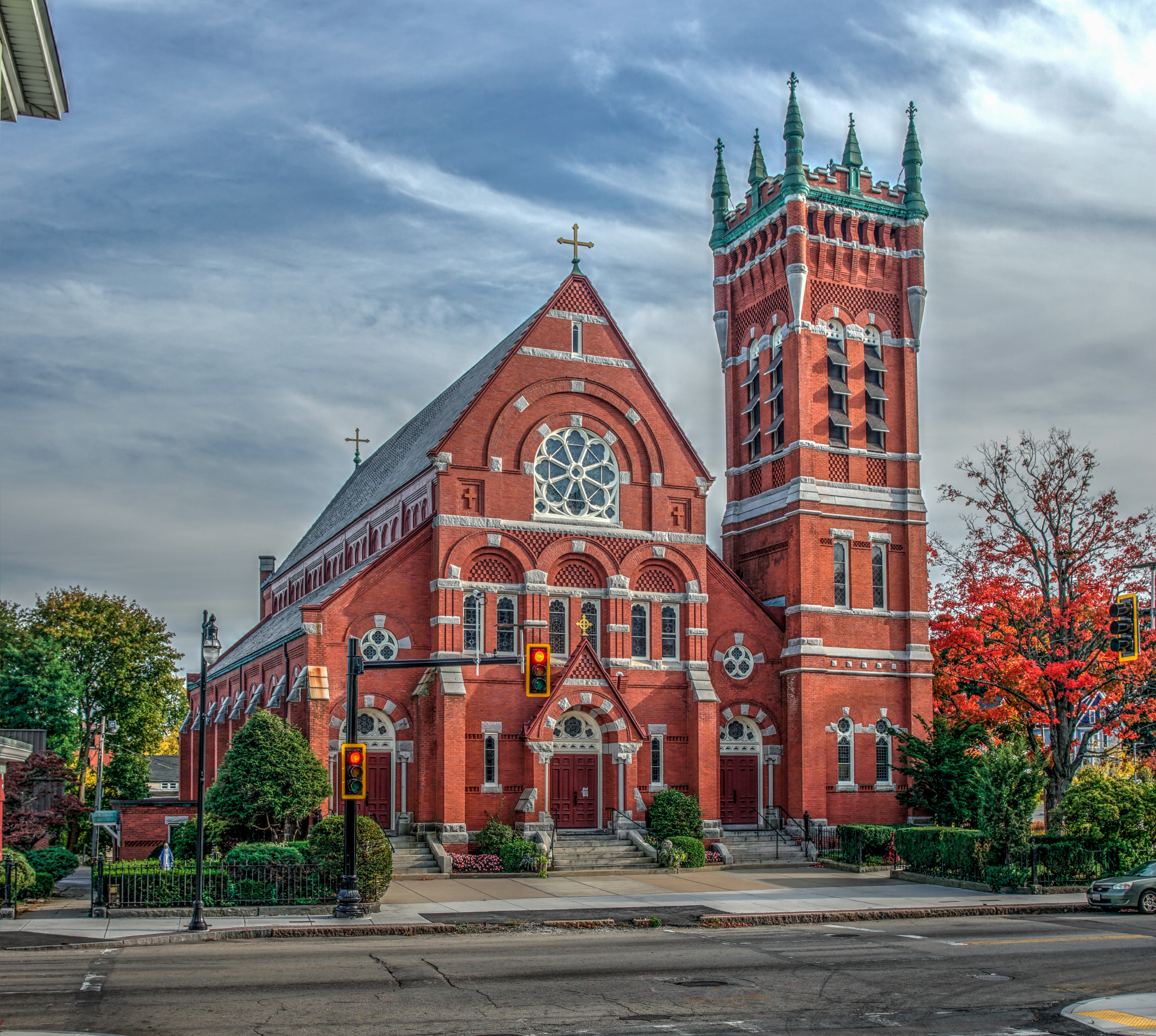

- Location within Massachusetts Location within the United States
- Location: 935 Main St., Worcester, Massachusetts, U.S.
- Coordinates: 42°15′11″N 71°49′18″W
- Area: less than one acre
- Built: 1884
- Architect: Patrick W. Ford
- Architectural style: Gothic Revival
- MPS: Worcester MRA
- NRHP reference No.: 80000548
- Added to NRHP: March 05, 1980

St. Peter's Catholic Church is a historic church building at 935 Main Street in Worcester, Massachusetts. Built in 1884, the church is one of the city's finest and most ornate examples of Gothic Revival architecture. It was listed on the National Register of Historic Places in 1980. It is home to an active parish in the Roman Catholic Diocese of Worcester.

== Architecture and history ==
St. Peter's is located on the south side of Main Street in southwestern Worcester, directly opposite the main Clark University campus. It is a red brick structure with granite trim and ornate Gothic Revival styling. It is basically rectangular, with a square tower projecting from the right front corner and a central projecting section on the main facade. The tower has two narrow round-arch windows in the first three stages, this in the third (belfry) stage taller. It is topped with ornate crenellations and spires. The main facade has three entrances, one in the projecting section, and one each on either side. The central entrance, set in a round-arch opening, is under a gable-roofed projection, with a row of round-arch windows set pairwise in round-arch recesses. The flanking entrances are also set in round-arch openings, with circular rose windows on the second level.

St. Peter's Parish was established in 1884 to provide services to the burgeoning population of southwestern Worcester. Ground for the church was broken on its construction that year, but it was not completed until 1893, the year in which it was formally dedicated. It was designed by architect Patrick W. Ford.

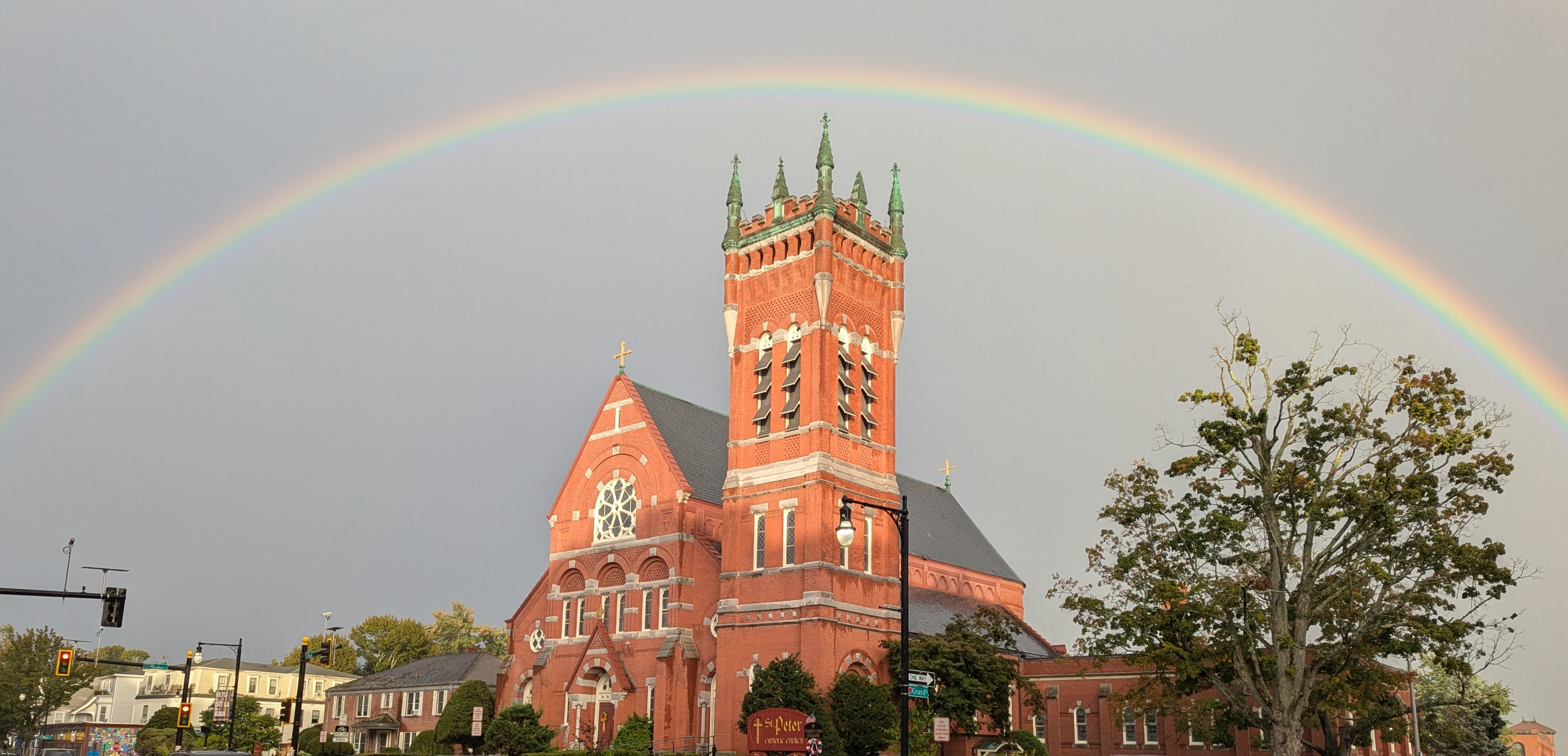
An image of St. Peter's Catholic Church in Worcester, Massachusetts, underneath a rainbow on an evening in late summer.

== See also ==
- National Register of Historic Places listings in southwestern Worcester, Massachusetts
- National Register of Historic Places listings in Worcester County, Massachusetts
