= St. Mary's Church of the Immaculate Conception Complex =

Historic church in Rhode Island, United States

- U.S. National Register of Historic Places
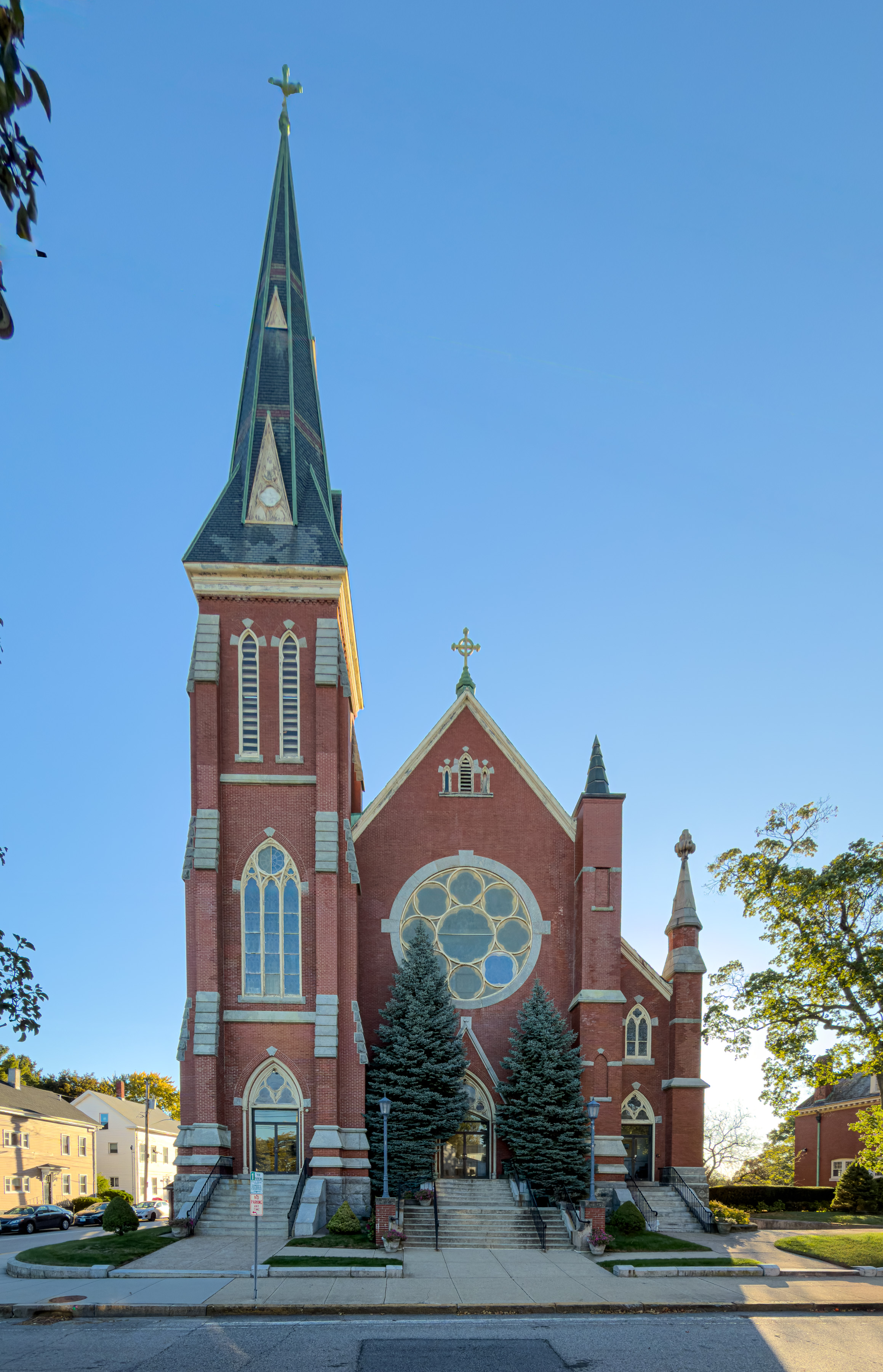
- St. Mary's Church of the Immaculate Conception

- Location within Rhode Island Location within the United States
- Location: Pawtucket, Rhode Island
- Coordinates: 41°52′18″N 71°23′22″W
- Area: 6.5 acres (2.6 ha)
- Built: 1828
- Architect: James Murphy; Murphy, Hindle & Wright
- Architectural style: Second Empire, Gothic Revival
- Website: www.saintmaryri.org/parish-announcements
- MPS: Pawtucket MRA
- NRHP reference No.: 83003856
- Added to NRHP: November 18, 1983

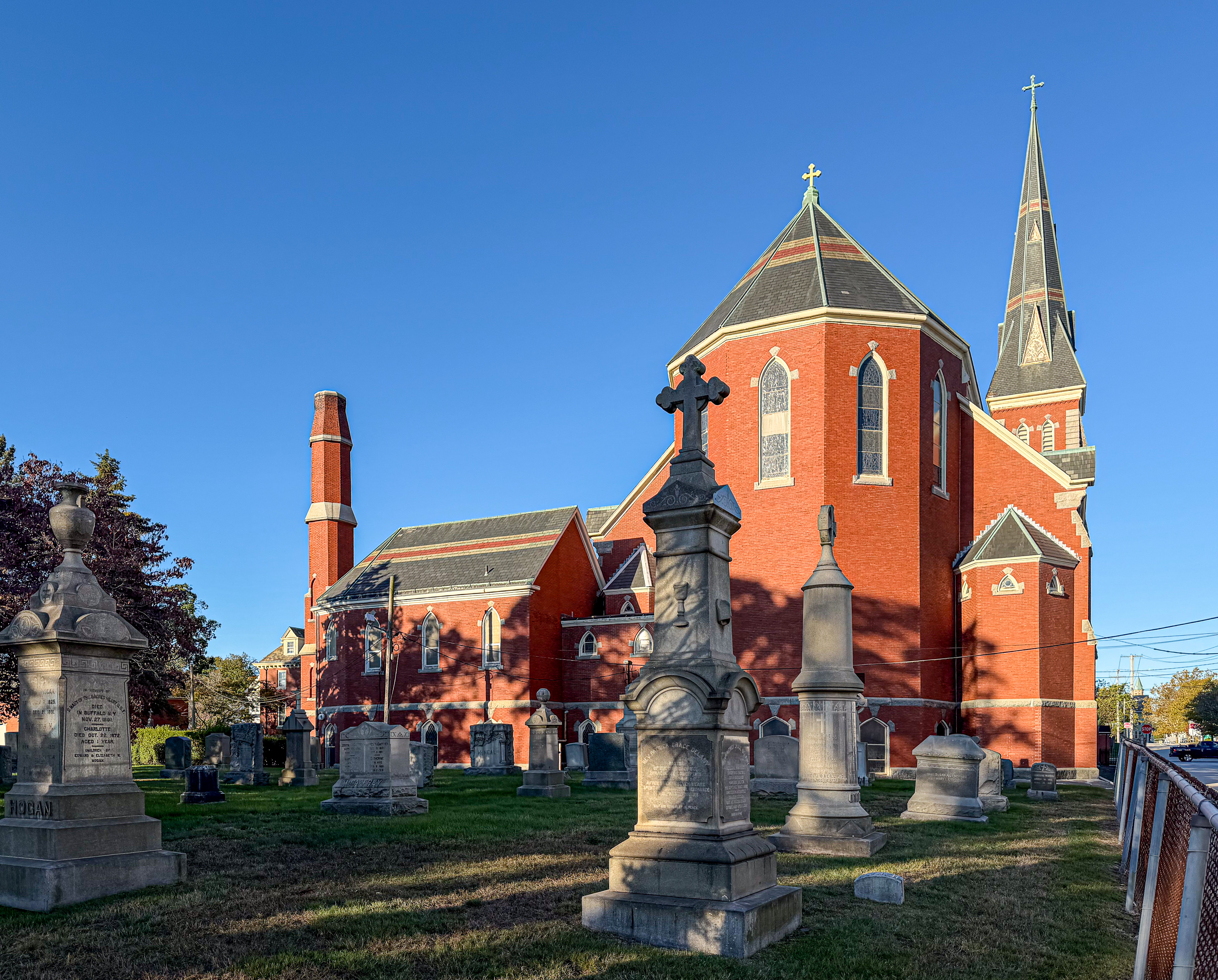
Rear of church and cemetery

St. Mary's Church of the Immaculate Conception Complex is an historic Roman Catholic church complex at 103 Pine Street in Pawtucket, Rhode Island.

== Description ==
The complex includes four buildings and a cemetery, set on about 6.5 acres (2.6 ha) of land. It is home to the oldest Catholic parish in Pawtucket, and the second-oldest in the Roman Catholic Diocese of Providence, which encompasses the entire state. The parish was established in 1830. The only surviving element from its early years is the cemetery. The present church, a red brick structure with Gothic Revival styling, was built in 1885–87. Also in the complex is the rectory, a 2 1/2-story Tudor Revival house built in 1909–10, a convent (1895–96), and school (1890–91).

== History ==
The hurricane of 1938 caused extensive damage to the church. Five stained glass windows were destroyed and the school belfry was blown off the roof and smashed to pieces.

The complex was added to the National Register of Historic Places in 1983.

In 2004, the parish celebrated its 175th anniversary, and the school celebrated its 150th anniversary.

In 2009, the church's school closed, and students were allowed to transfer to the nearby regional school.

== See also ==
- National Register of Historic Places listings in Pawtucket, Rhode Island
