= John J. McMahon (architect) =

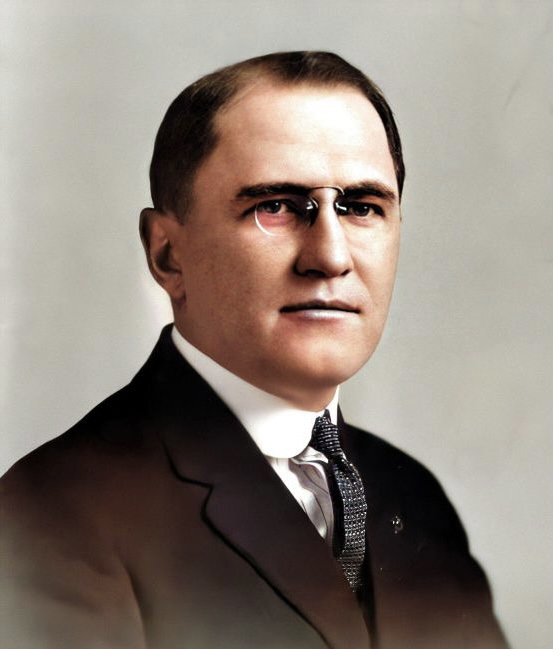
- Born: April 22, 1875; Hartford, Connecticut
- Died: September 8, 1958 (aged 83); Newington, Connecticut
- Known for: Architect, partner in Dwyer and McMahon, Whiton and McMahon and John J. McMahon

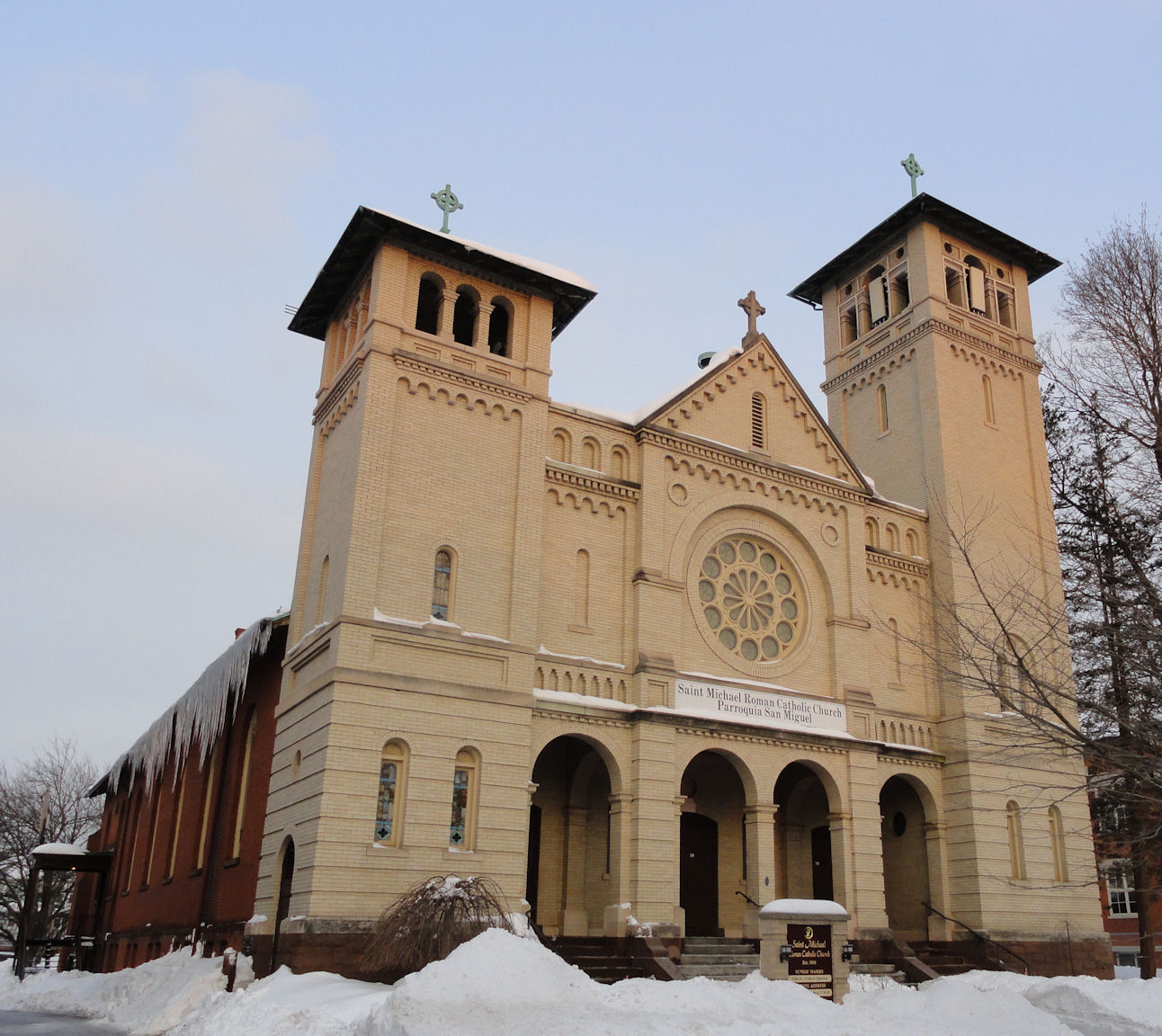
St. Michael Church, Hartford, Connecticut - Dwyer and McMahon Architects

John Joseph McMahon (April 22, 1875 – September 8, 1958) was an American architect who even today remains highly regarded for his churches, schools and other buildings for Catholic clients in Connecticut, especially Hartford and New Haven.

== Early life and architectural training ==
McMahon was born April 22, 1875, in Hartford, Connecticut, where he would live for the rest of his life. He studied as a boy at St. Patrick School where one of his classmates, John F. Callahan, would later become a Catholic priest and one of McMahon's clients. He left school a few months before graduation in 1890 and took a job as an errand boy.

Three years later he was hired by the architectural firm of Frederick R. Comstock as an apprentice. He worked both in Hartford and New York City. His most notable project was the 1899 Second Church of Christ Scientist, located at 68th Street and Central Park West, New York City. His architectural training was cut short when he enlisted in the Connecticut National Guard to take part in the Spanish–American War. Eventually McMahon attained the rank of colonel and was henceforth known, professionally and otherwise, as "the Colonel".

== Architectural practice ==
In 1900 McMahon became associate architect of the Hartford, CT firm J. J. Dwyer & J. J. McMahon, with John J. Dwyer. He remained in this position until 1911 when he entered into a long partnership with Frank Warren Whiton, forming the firm of Whiton and McMahon. They continued together until 1932 when the practice was dissolved due to the economic depression. After that McMahon practiced under his own name and briefly with architect Russell Hills.

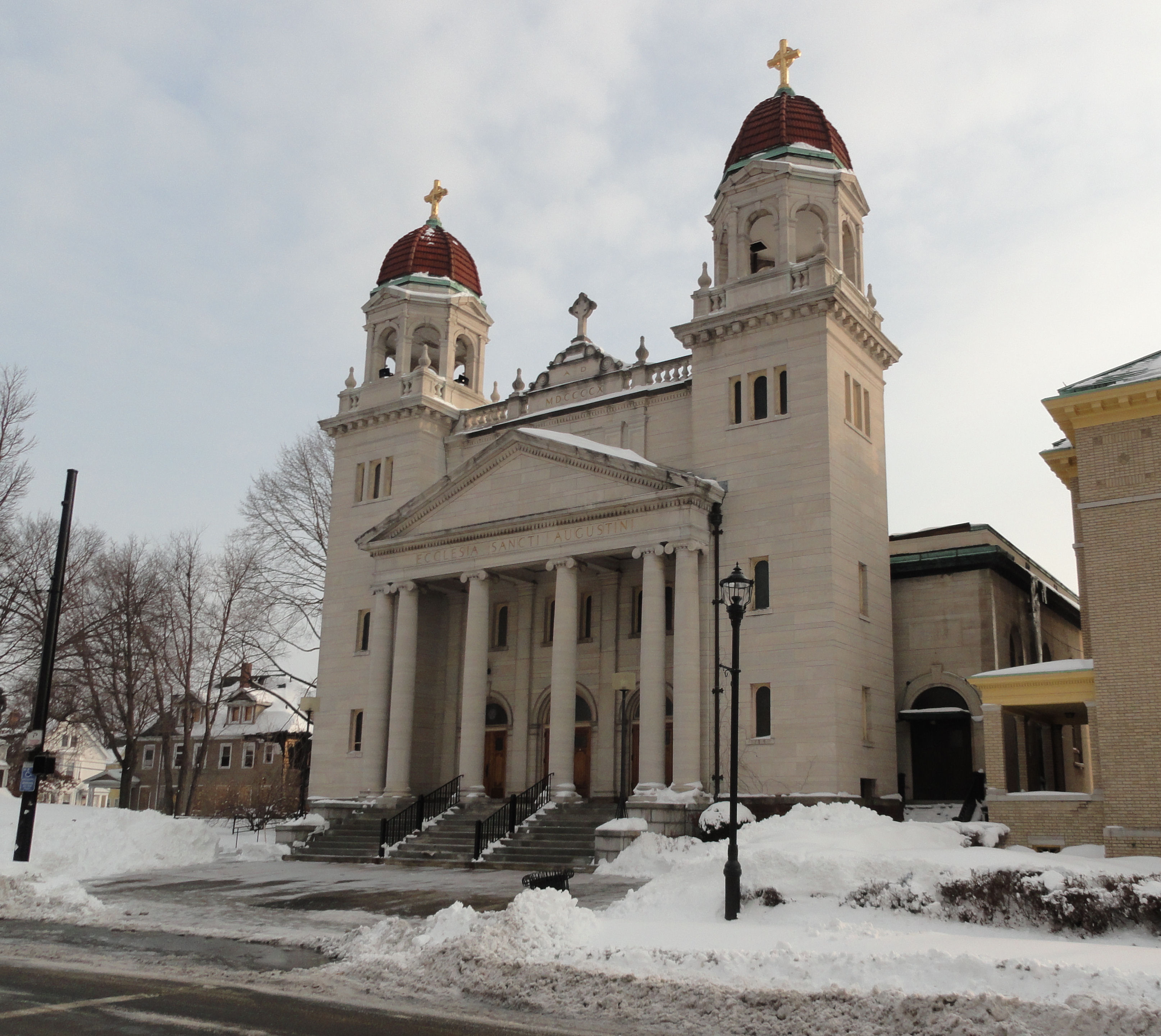
St. Augustine Church Hartford Connecticut Whiton and McMahon (served briefly as cathedral)

== Works include ==
=== J. J. Dwyer and J. J. McMahon ===
- Mount Saint Joseph Academy, West Hartford, Connecticut
- St. Michael Church, Hartford, Connecticut
- St. Augustine Church, Hartford, Connecticut (basement only)
- St. Joseph Church, Danbury, Connecticut
- St. Mary Church, Simsbury, Connecticut (this church has since been replaced)
- St, Mary Church, Branford, Connecticut (this church has since been replaced)
- St. Patrick Church, Bridgeport, Connecticut (superstructure only, built on a basement church by James Murphy
- St. Francis Hospital Hartford, Connecticut (administration building)
- Elks Club Lodge, Hartford, Connecticut
- St. Teresa Church, Woodbury, Connecticut
- St Mary's Home for the Aged, West Hartford, Connecticut
- St. Peter's Parochial School, Hartford, CT
- St. John's School for Boys, Deep River, CT
- St. John's Parochial School, Watertown, CT
- St. Joseph's Novitiate, West Hartford, CT

=== Whiton and McMahon ===
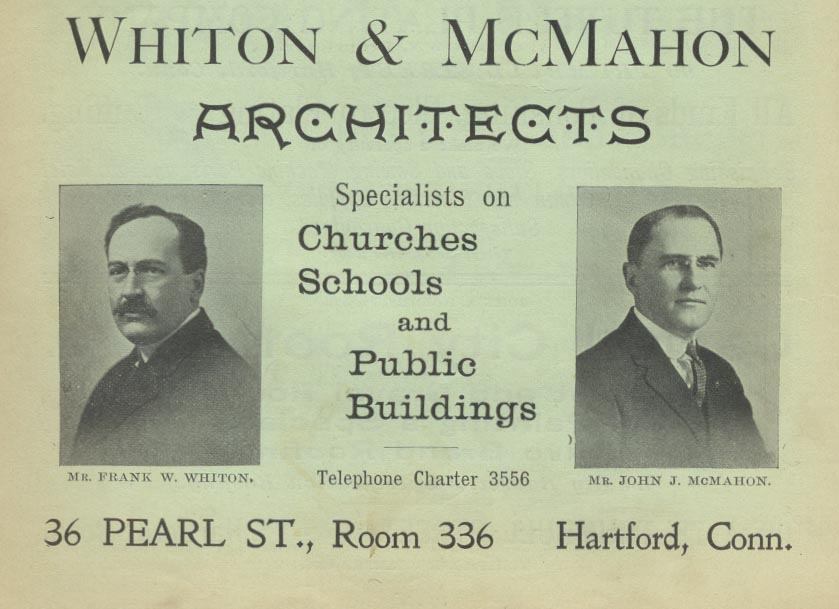
Whiton and McMahon Ad from 1916 Hartford City Directory

- St. Luke Church, Hartford, Connecticut (basement church, later completed by another unknown architect)
- St. Justin Church, Hartford, Connecticut
- St. Augustine Church, Hartford, Connecticut (superstructure, school and rectory)
- St. Paul Church, Glastonbury, Connecticut
- St. Lawrence O'Toole Church, Hartford, Connecticut (with Russell Hills)
- St. John of the Cross Church, Middlebury, Connecticut
- St. Brendan Church, New Haven, Connecticut
- St. Rose of Lima Church, New Haven, Connecticut
- St. Bernard Church, Sharon, Connecticut
- St. Peter Church, Hartford, Connecticut (new towers)
- St. Gabriel Church, Windsor, Connecticut
- * St. Mary Chapel, Newington, Connecticut (this church has since been replaced)
- Most Holy Trinity Church, Hartford, Connecticut
- St. Thomas the Apostle Church, West Hartford, Connecticut
- Wilson St. School, Hartford CT
- Arsenal School, Hartford CT
- Alfred E. Burr School, Hartford CT
- St James Parochial School, Manchester, CT
- Washington St. School additions, Hartford CT
- Richard J. Kinsella School, (now the Betances School), Hartford CT
- Dr. James H Naylor School, Hartford, CT
- Moylan (Hillside Ave)School, Hartford, CT

=== John J. McMahon ===
- Corpus Christi Church, Wethersfield, Connecticut
- St Peter and Paul Church, Norwich, Connecticut
- St. Thomas the Apostle Church (superstructure), School and rectory, West Hartford, Connecticut

== Reading ==
- McMahon, John J. "A Grandfather's Contribution to Hartford's Unique Architectural Landscape" (PDF). Archived from the original (PDF) on 26 July 2011.
- McMahon, John J. "Devine Designs Hartford Architect Created Many of State's Catholic Churches". Archived from the original on 2 April 2012.
- McMahon, John J. "John J. McMahon Papers at Connecticut State Library". Archived from the original on 11 October 2011.
