= St. Rose's Catholic Church (St. Rose, Ohio) =

- St. Rose Catholic Church Complex
- U.S. National Register of Historic Places
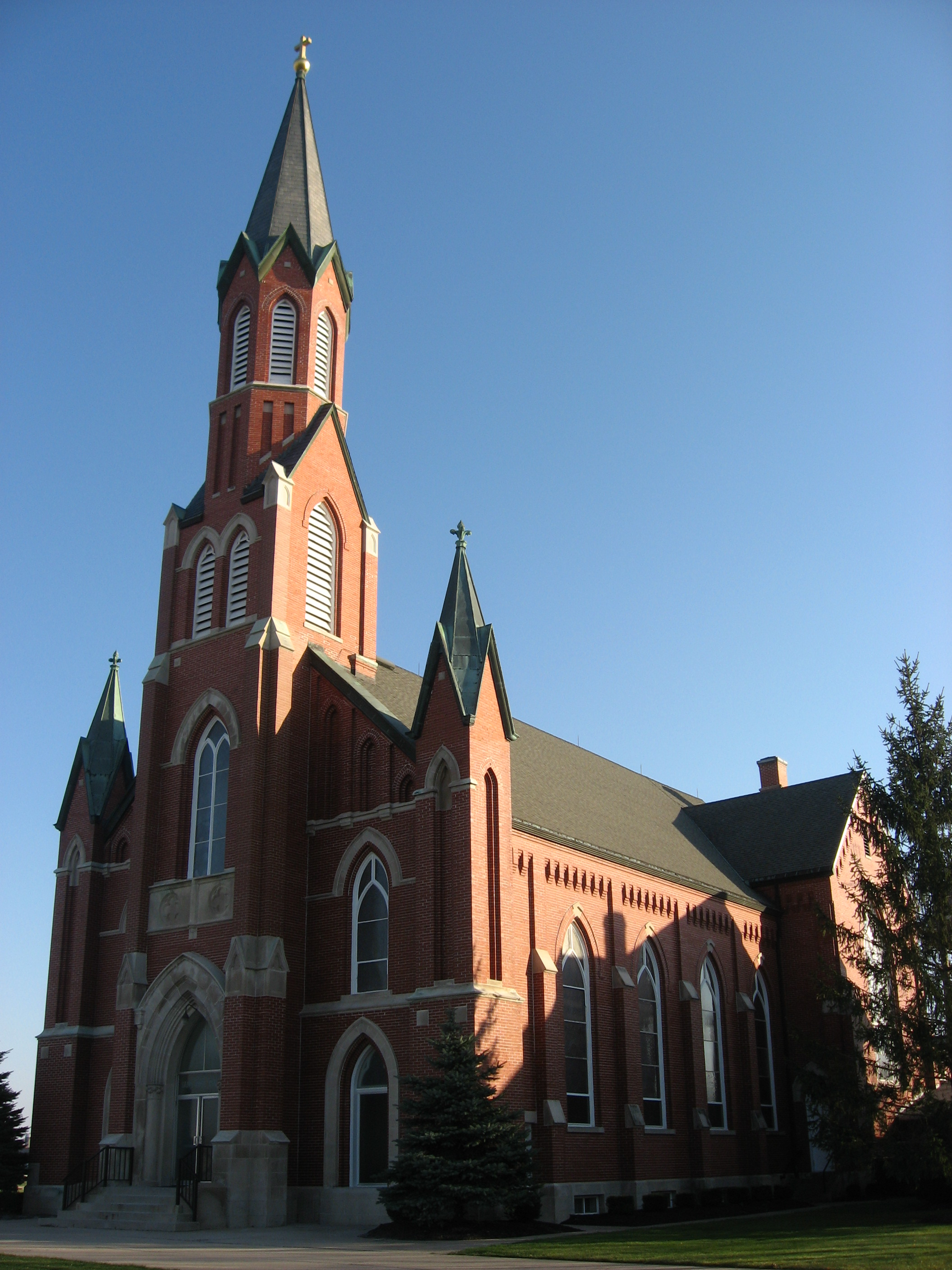
- Front and western side of the church

- Location within Ohio Location within the United States
- Location: Main St., St. Rose, Ohio
- Coordinates: 40°24′26″N 84°30′53″W
- Area: 2 acres (0.81 ha)
- Built: 1892
- Architectural style: Gothic Revival
- MPS: Cross-Tipped Churches of Ohio TR
- NRHP reference No.: 79002838
- Added to NRHP: July 26, 1979

St. Rose's Catholic Church (also known as "St. Rosa's Catholic Church") is a historic Catholic church in St. Rose, an unincorporated community in Marion Township, Mercer County, Ohio, United States.

== Parish history ==
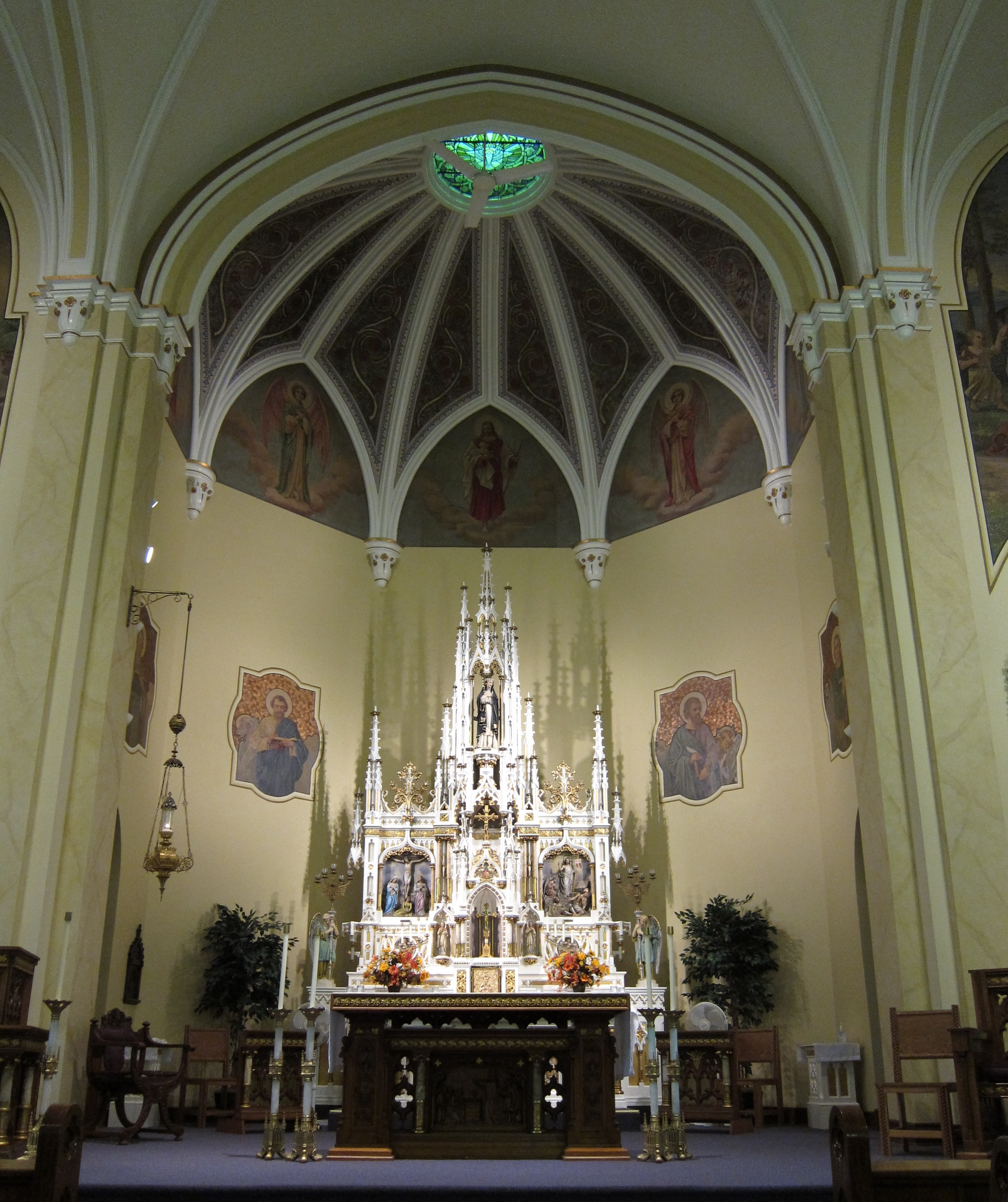
Church sanctuary

Catholics near the community of St. Rose began meeting for worship in 1837; they built a log church building in the following year, and in early 1842, they purchased land ultimately to be used for a cemetery and a larger church. In 1844, these individuals were erected into a separate parish, which was dedicated to St. Rose. At that time, the parish encompassed a significantly larger area than it does today; five other parishes — Nativity in Cassella, St. Sebastian in Sebastian, Precious Blood in Chickasaw, St. Aloysius in Carthagena, and Our Lady of Guadalupe in Montezuma — were partially or entirely formed from territory originally included in St. Rose parish.

Mass was celebrated at the church sporadically for its first eight years; only in 1845, after several priests from the Congregation of the Precious Blood began serving St. Rose and several surrounding parishes, were the parishioners able to have regular services. By the 1850s, the log church building had become too small, so a replacement brick structure was constructed at a cost of $6,000 and consecrated in mid-1854. Measuring 42 feet (13 m) by 75 feet (23 m), it was periodically modernized; by 1907, it featured such improvements as acetylene lighting. However, this structure in turn was becoming too small by this time; four years later, a third church building was begun, and it was consecrated in September 1912.

Today, St. Rose's remains an active parish of the Archdiocese of Cincinnati. It is part of the Marion Catholic Community cluster, along with Precious Blood parish in Chickasaw, Nativity of the Blessed Virgin parish in Cassella, St. Sebastian parish in Sebastian, and St. John the Baptist parish in Maria Stein. The entire cluster is a part of the St. Marys Deanery.

== Buildings ==
The parish owns three buildings located adjacent to each other: the church, a rectory, and a former one-room school.

=== Church ===
St. Rose's Church is a High Gothic Revival structure, three bays wide on the front and five bays long on the sides. Built in the shape of a Latin cross, the church is a single-story brick building; it rests on a foundation of blue Bedford limestone with a basement and is covered with a gabled roof of asphalt. Among its leading architectural elements is its octagonal steeple, topped with a louvered belfry. The two corners of the facade feature tall, thin windows and are topped with miniature square towers. Inside, the sanctuary is decorated with multiple white reredos and many statues; the interior is illuminated by light from lancet windows, one of each which is found in each of the side bays. Throughout the building, the architectural elements include high pointed arches. A small cemetery sits behind the church.

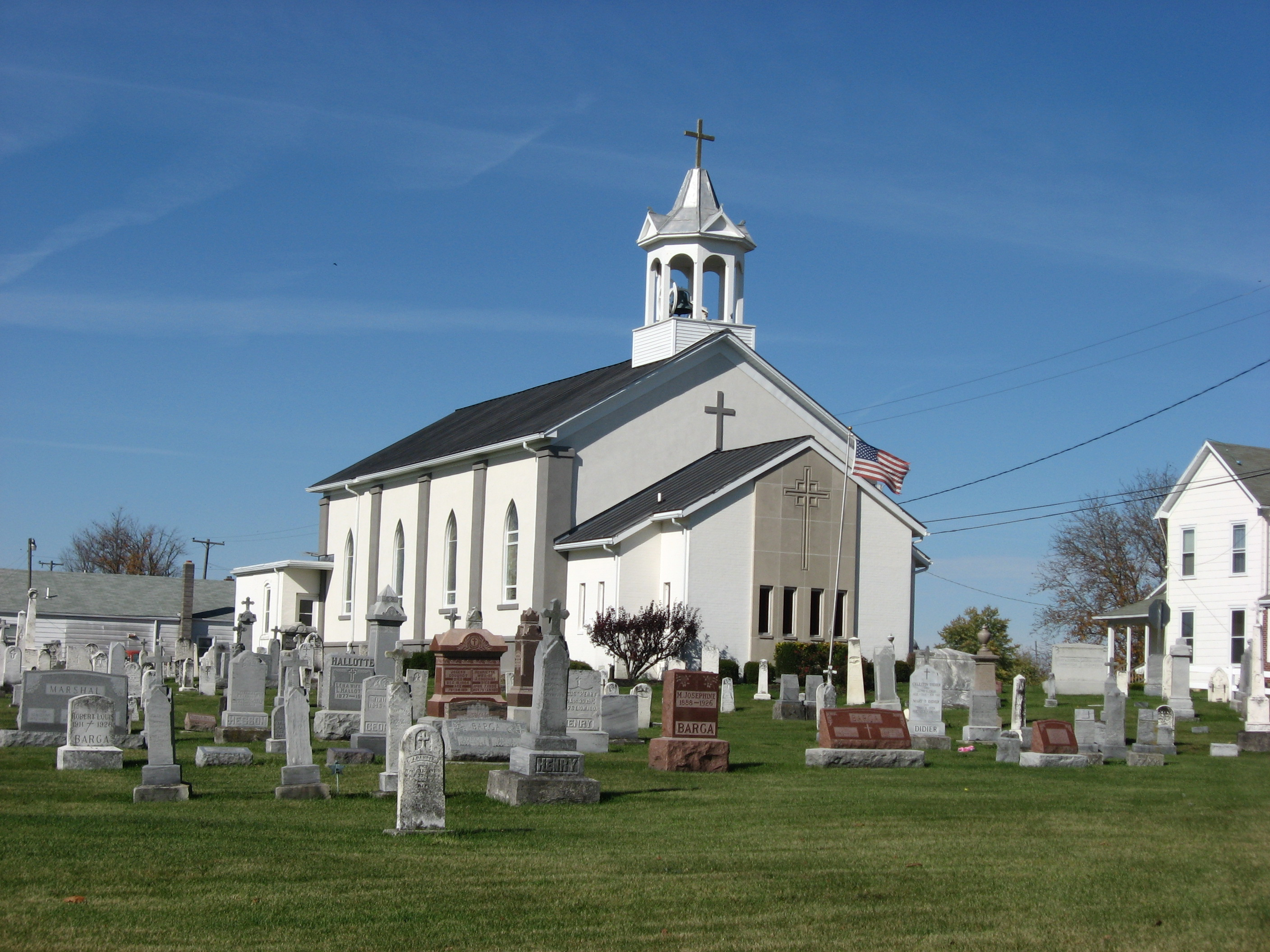
Holy Family Catholic Church, which the old St. Rose Church resembled

Architectural historians have divided the Precious Blood-related churches of western Ohio into four generations. Constructed in 1912, St. Rose's is a member of the fourth generation, although it resembles many third-generation churches because of its Gothic Revival architecture that features a single central tower. It is one of three extant churches from the fourth generation that were designed by the DeCurtins family. Although the construction date of the previous church building places it in the middle of the first generation, it more closely resembled second-generation churches such as Holy Family in Frenchtown.

=== Rectory ===
Located adjacent to the church on the west is a three-story rectory. Built in 1905 at a cost of $6,000, it is a rectangular brick building that rests on an ashlar foundation; it is covered with a slate roof. Three bays wide on the front and four long on the sides, it features gables on the front and sides, a large verandah-style front porch, and two bay windows. Individuals enter the house through an ornate recessed front door, which is ornamented with details such as an elliptical fanlight with a keystone, a bevelled window, and recessed sidelights. Before the rectory's construction, St. Rose parish was served by priests who lived at the nearby Gruenwald and Maria Stein Convents.

=== School ===
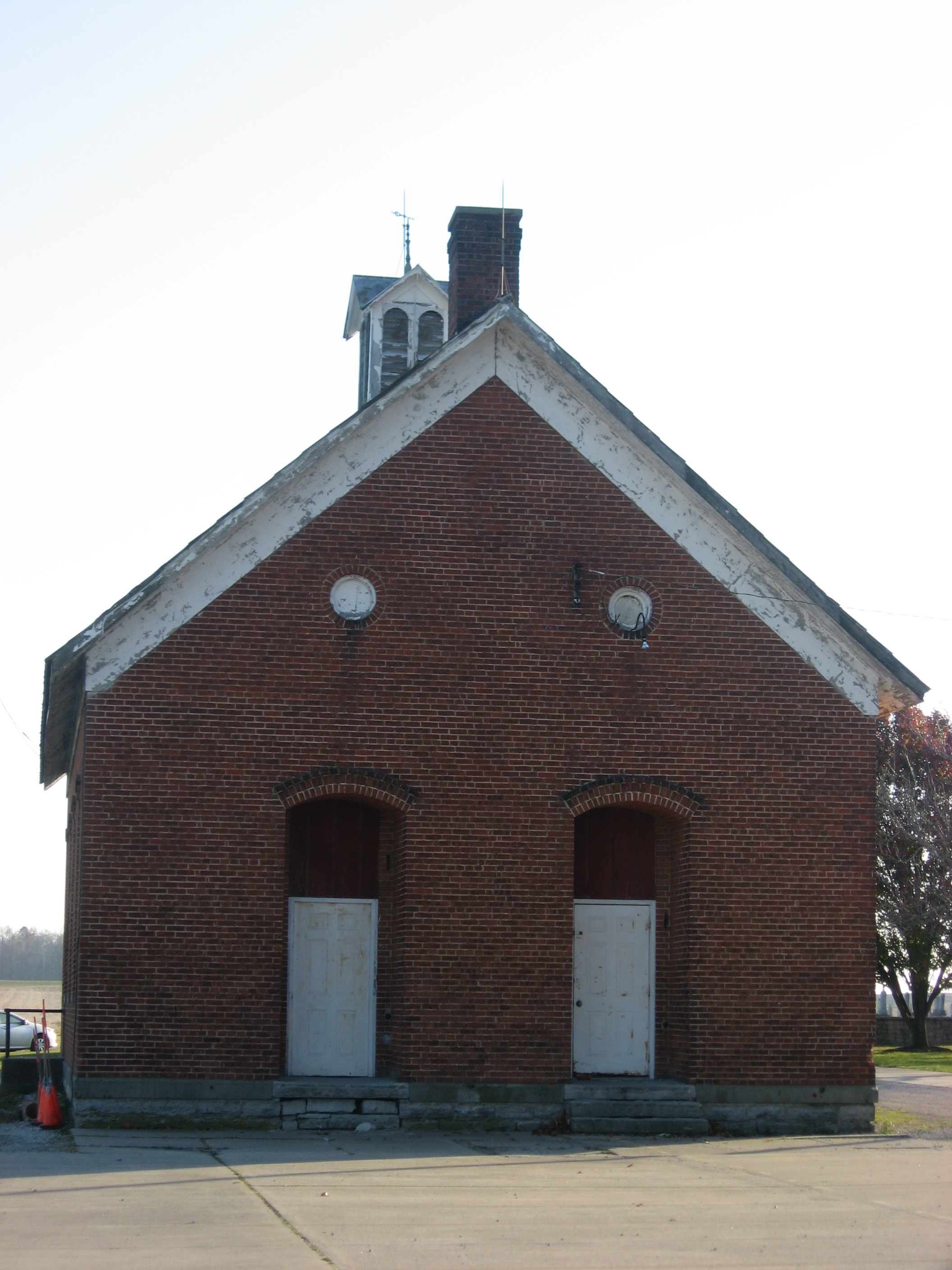
Front of the school

Located adjacent to the church on the east is a single-story former parish school. Erected in 1892, it was the second school in St. Rose; it replaced a previous building that was destroyed circa 1900. Built as a one-room school, the building was modified in 1941 and converted into a two-room school. It operated until closure in 1957, due to the enactment of a law by the Ohio General Assembly requiring all school districts to provide a four-year high school education. Since that time, local students have attended the schools of the Marion Local School District.

After its closure, the old school was modified to be a parish hall and a recreation center.

== Recognition ==
In 1977, St. Rose's Church, its rectory, and its school were studied by the Ohio Historic Inventory, a historic preservation program of the Ohio Historical Society. All three buildings were found to be in good condition without any threats to their continued survival. At that time, the church was deemed eligible for addition to the National Register of Historic Places, and all three buildings were added to the Register together in 1979. They were part of a group of more than thirty different Precious Blood-related churches and other religious properties listed on the Register at the same time, including at least one building owned by each of the Marion Catholic Community parishes. The tall Gothic Revival architecture of many churches in this part of far western Ohio has become the namesake of this region, which is nicknamed the "Land of the Cross-Tipped Churches."
