= Nativity of the Blessed Virgin Mary Catholic Church =

Church in Cassella, Ohio, United States

- Cassella Catholic Church and Rectory
- U.S. National Register of Historic Places
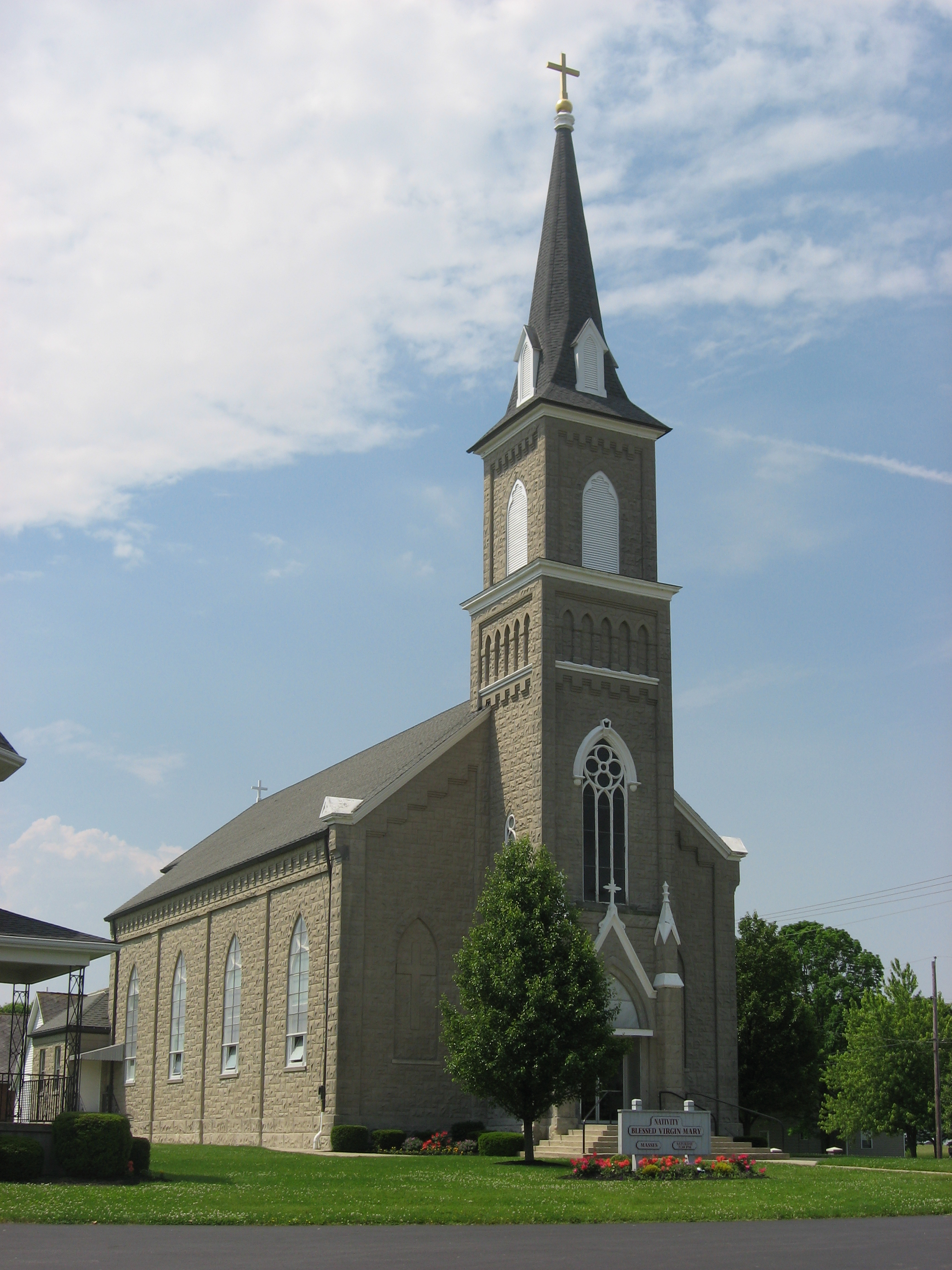
- Front of the church

- Location within Ohio Location within the United States
- Location: State Route 119 in Cassella, Ohio
- Coordinates: 40°24′24″N 84°33′3″W
- Area: 1 acre (0.40 ha)
- Built: 1858
- Architectural style: Gothic Revival
- MPS: Cross-Tipped Churches of Ohio TR
- NRHP reference No.: 79002822
- Added to NRHP: July 26, 1979

The Nativity of the Blessed Virgin Mary Catholic Church is a Catholic church in Cassella, an unincorporated community in Mercer County, Ohio, United States. One of several Catholic churches in Marion Township, it was designated a historic site because of its well-preserved 19th-century architecture.

== Parish history ==
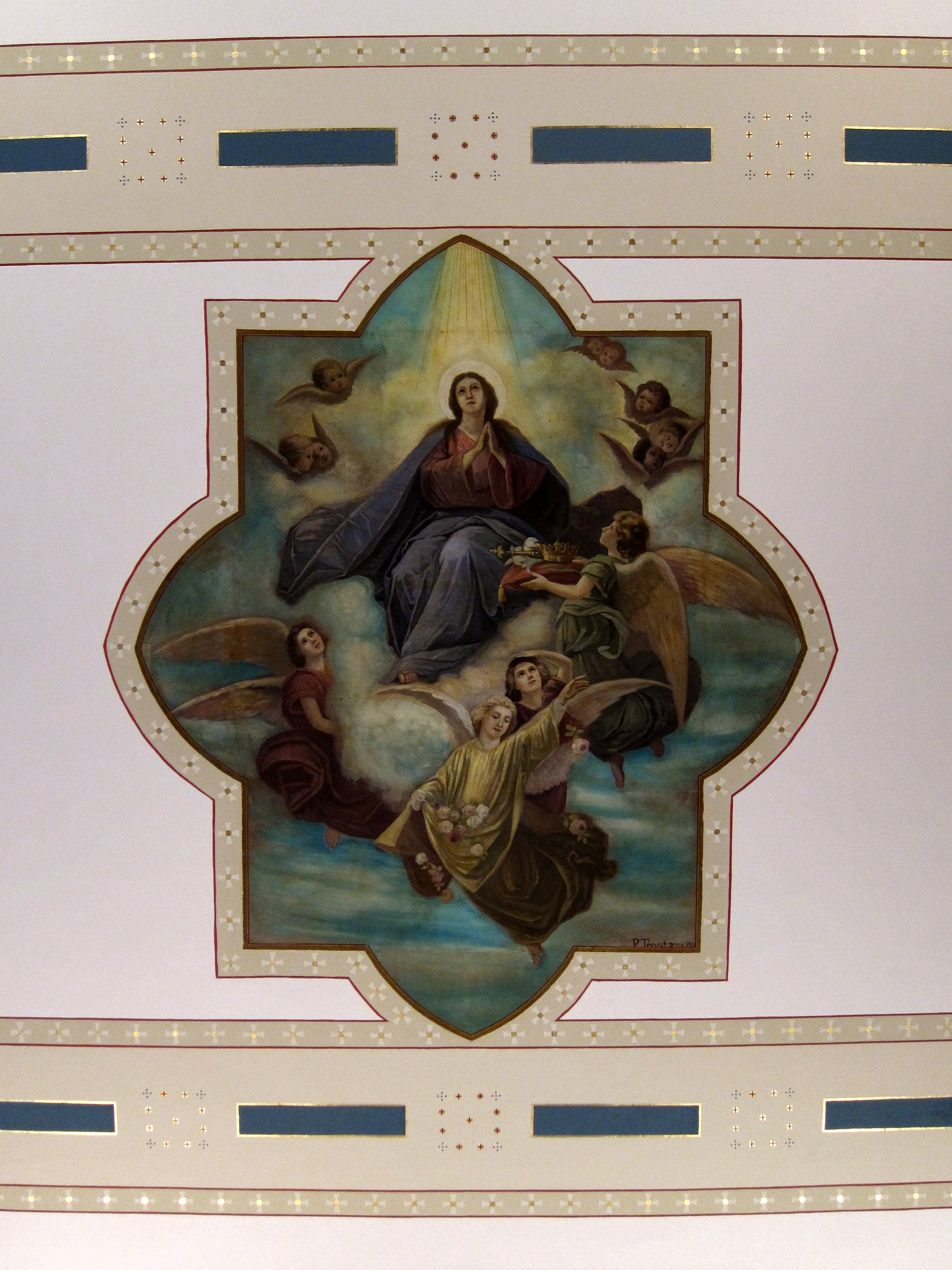
This fresco from the church ceiling depicts the Immaculate Conception.

Founded in 1847, Nativity parish was served from its earliest years by itinerant priests of the Society of the Precious Blood. Soon after the parish's formation, a small frame church building was erected on the northeastern corner of the intersection of what is now Cassella-Montezuma Road and State Route 119. The parish was reduced by the formation of St. Francis parish in Cranberry Prairie: due to the difficulty of travelling to Cassella, the Catholics in the western part of the parish requested a separate church, and St. Francis parish was founded in 1858.

Despite the creation of St. Francis' Church, the original frame church had become too small by the late 1850s. Starting in 1858, the parishioners spent $6,000 to construct a replacement brick structure on the southeastern corner of the intersection. Other buildings were constructed around the church, including a large house for the pastor.

Today, Nativity remains an active parish of the Archdiocese of Cincinnati. It is part of the Marion Catholic Community cluster, along with Precious Blood parish in Chickasaw, St. Sebastian parish in Sebastian, St. Rose parish in St. Rose, and St. John the Baptist parish in Maria Stein. The entire cluster is a part of the St. Marys Deanery.

== Buildings ==
Several buildings owned by or related to the parish are located at Cassella's primary intersection. Centered on the parish church, these buildings were completed over a period of more than 50 years.

=== Church ===
The church building is a rectangular single-story structure, three bays wide on the front and four bays long on the sides. Built on a stone foundation with a basement, the walls are of brick covered with stone, and the building is covered with a gabled roof of asphalt. Begun in 1858, the church was consecrated in August, 1862. The High Gothic Revival church was greatly modified after an 1888 fire that nearly destroyed the original structure: the original walls survived, badly burnt, but the interior was destroyed. Although the church was soon rebuilt at a cost of $16,000, the exterior displayed signs of fire for many years; only in 1915 was the damage hidden, as travelling German craftsmen covered it with the cut stone exterior that remains in place today.

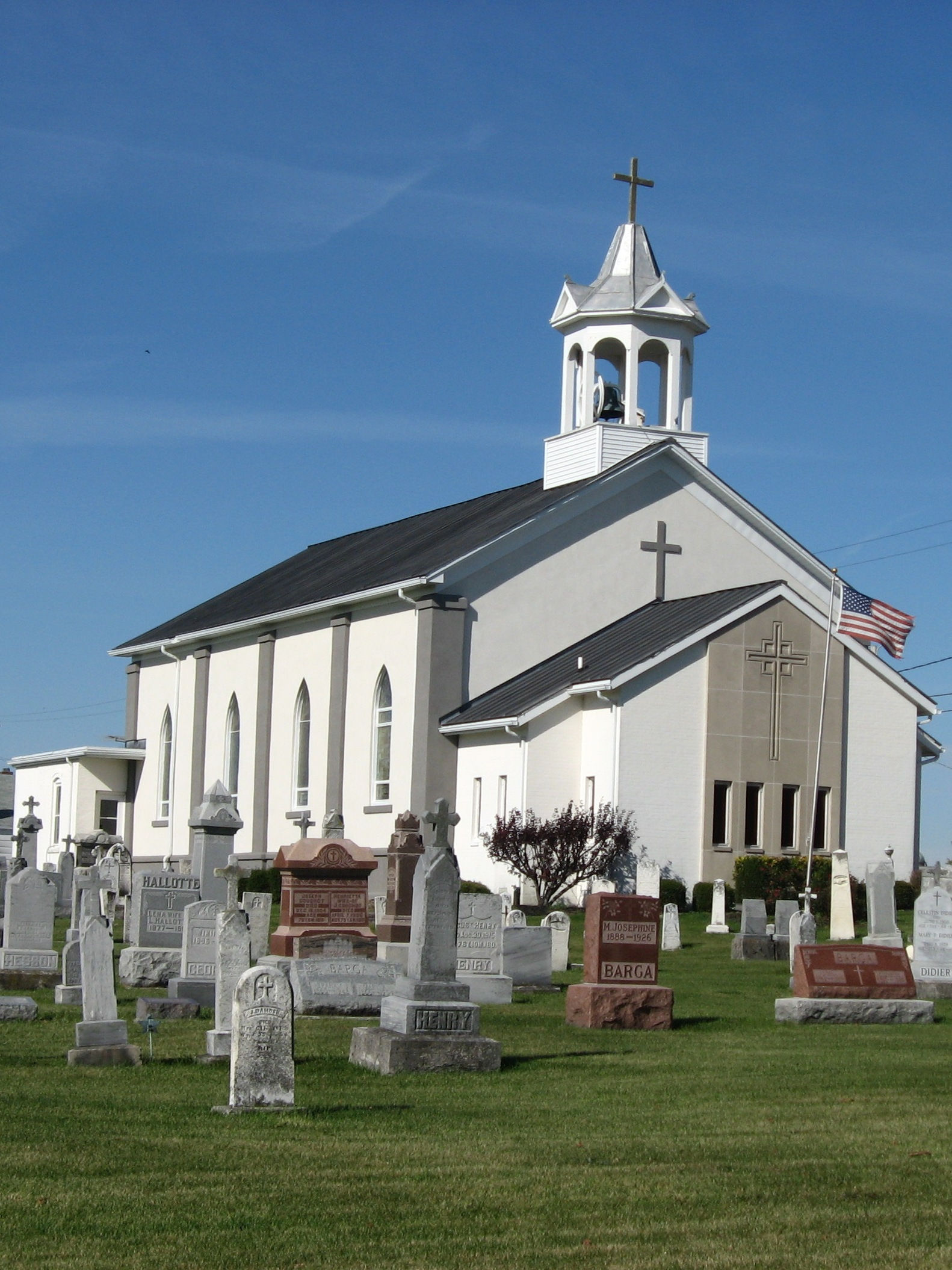
Holy Family Church, which Nativity Church resembled in its earliest years

Dominating the church's facade is a square tower at the front; topped with a cupola above an arch-shaped tracery window, it is decorated with ornamental columns. Worshippers enter the church through a large doorway in the tower's base. This tower was a later addition to the church: when it was first built, it was a small simple structure, similar to Holy Family Catholic Church in Frenchtown to the south. The inclusion of a tall tower in the design of St. Aloysius' Catholic Church in Carthagena, completed in 1877, was revolutionary in the region — later churches were built with such towers, and many existing churches (including Nativity) were modified by the addition of a tall tower. The tall Gothic Revival towers of many of these churches, including Nativity, led locals to nickname the region the "Land of the Cross-Tipped Churches"

Architectural historians have classified the Cross-Tipped Churches into four generations. Nativity's first parish church was typical of the first generation of churches, which were typically small frame buildings; only the brick St. John's Church in Fryburg has survived from this generation without significant modifications. Nativity is one of the oldest second-generation churches, which were generally small rectangular brick buildings such as Holy Family; although it was built during the years of the first generation, it assumed its present condition after the 1888 fire.

=== Rectory ===
Located adjacent to the church to the east is a large rectory that was constructed in 1904. A square two-story building, its walls are of brick laid in a common bond; they rest on an ashlar foundation and are topped with a hip roof of asphalt shingles. Among its notable architectural features are a large dormer window above the first-story verandah porch, an imbricated gable with a Palladian window, and an octagonal tower on the house's northwestern corner. The building's overall architecture is transitional between styles, with some Gothic Revival elements.

In the parish's first ten years, Mass was celebrated by errant priests who stayed at nearby convents during their visits; accordingly, there was no need for a rectory. Even after the parish was granted a settled pastor, he had no house; priests in the region typically lived at the nearby convents. This situation changed in the earliest years of the twentieth century, when an archiepiscopal directive required all parishes in the Archdiocese of Cincinnati to construct rectories for their pastors. The resulting houses are generally two-story rectangular brick structures with hip roofs and verandahs; the rectory at Cassella is one of the best-preserved examples of the period.

=== Other structures ===
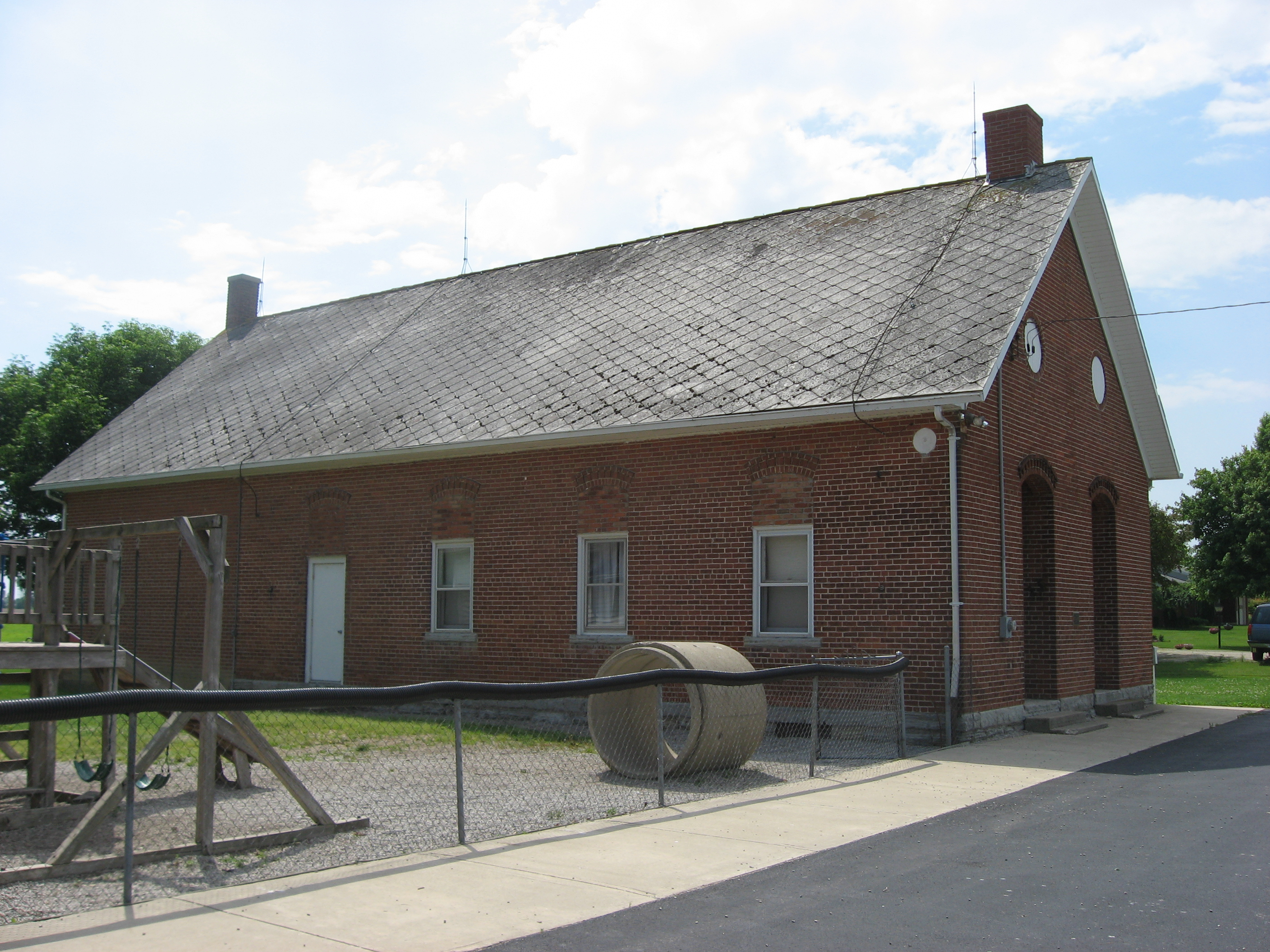
One of the former parish schools

Two former parish schools lie along Cassella-Montezuma Road, immediately south of the church. These one-room schools share several architectural features, including double round windows and double doors on their facades. Many parishes in the region built schools for their children; while many one-room schools have been demolished or greatly changed, others have been converted into parish halls or other non-scholastic types of buildings.

Soon after the establishment of the parish, the Sisters of the Precious Blood founded a convent approximately 0.5 miles (0.80 km) south of Cassella. Built in 1850 and known as the "Gruenwald Convent", it once housed 60 nuns. This building no longer functions as a convent.

== Recognition ==
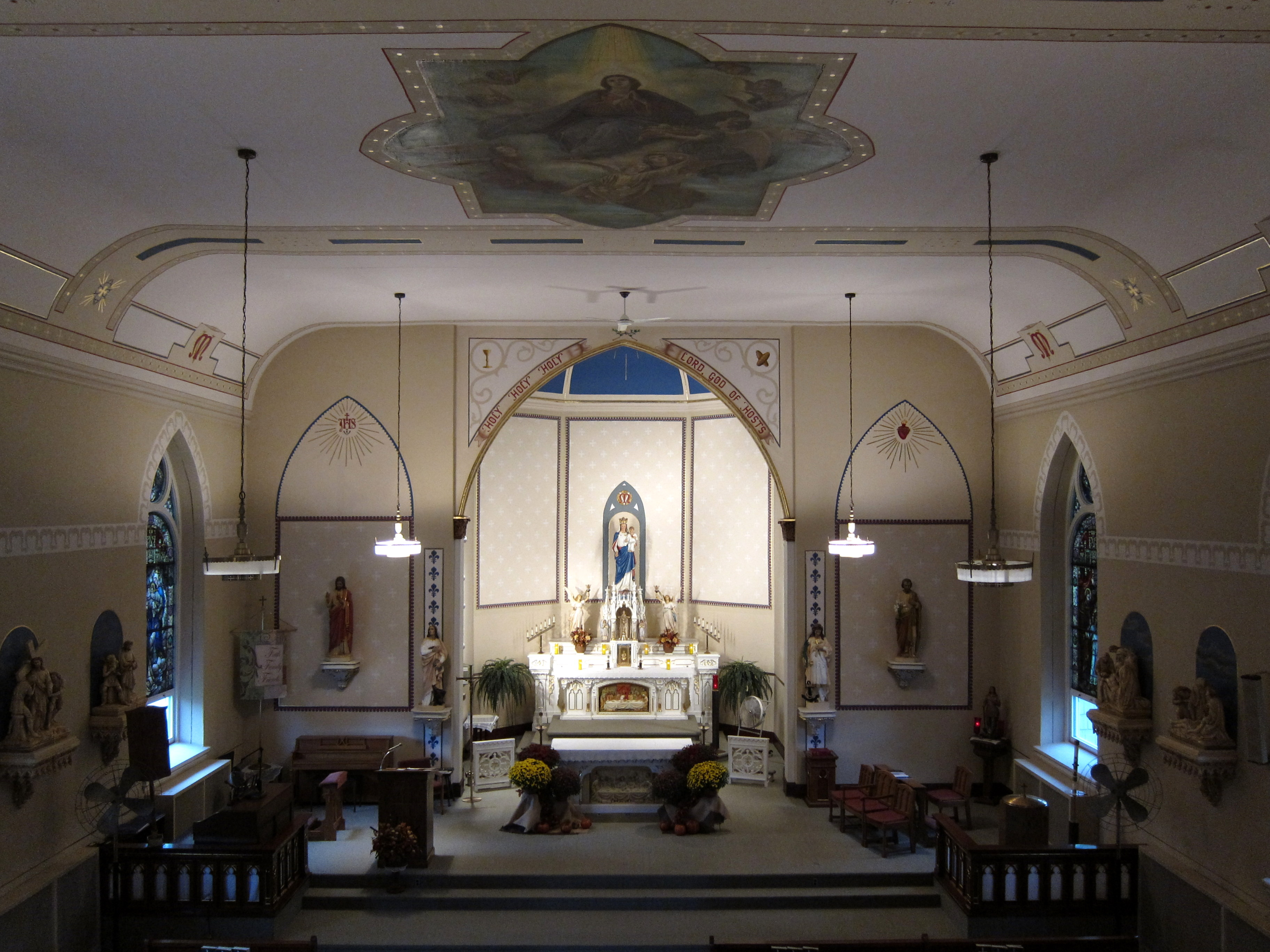
Church interior

In 1977, Nativity Church and its rectory were recorded by the Ohio Historic Inventory, a historic preservation survey conducted by the Ohio Historical Society. Although the survey observed that no efforts were being made toward the preservation of the buildings, both were classified as being in good condition on the interior and the exterior, and no threats to their continued existence could be found. Two years later, the church and rectory were listed together on the National Register of Historic Places because of their well-preserved historic architecture. At the same time, 32 other properties, including 25 churches, were listed on the Register as part of a multiple property submission of Precious Blood-related buildings in far western Ohio. Included among these are the Gruenwald Convent and most other churches of the Marion Catholic Community; Precious Blood Church in Chickasaw is not included, but its school and rectory are.
