= Precious Blood Catholic Church (Chickasaw, Ohio) =

Historic church in Ohio, United States

- Chickasaw School and Rectory
- U.S. National Register of Historic Places
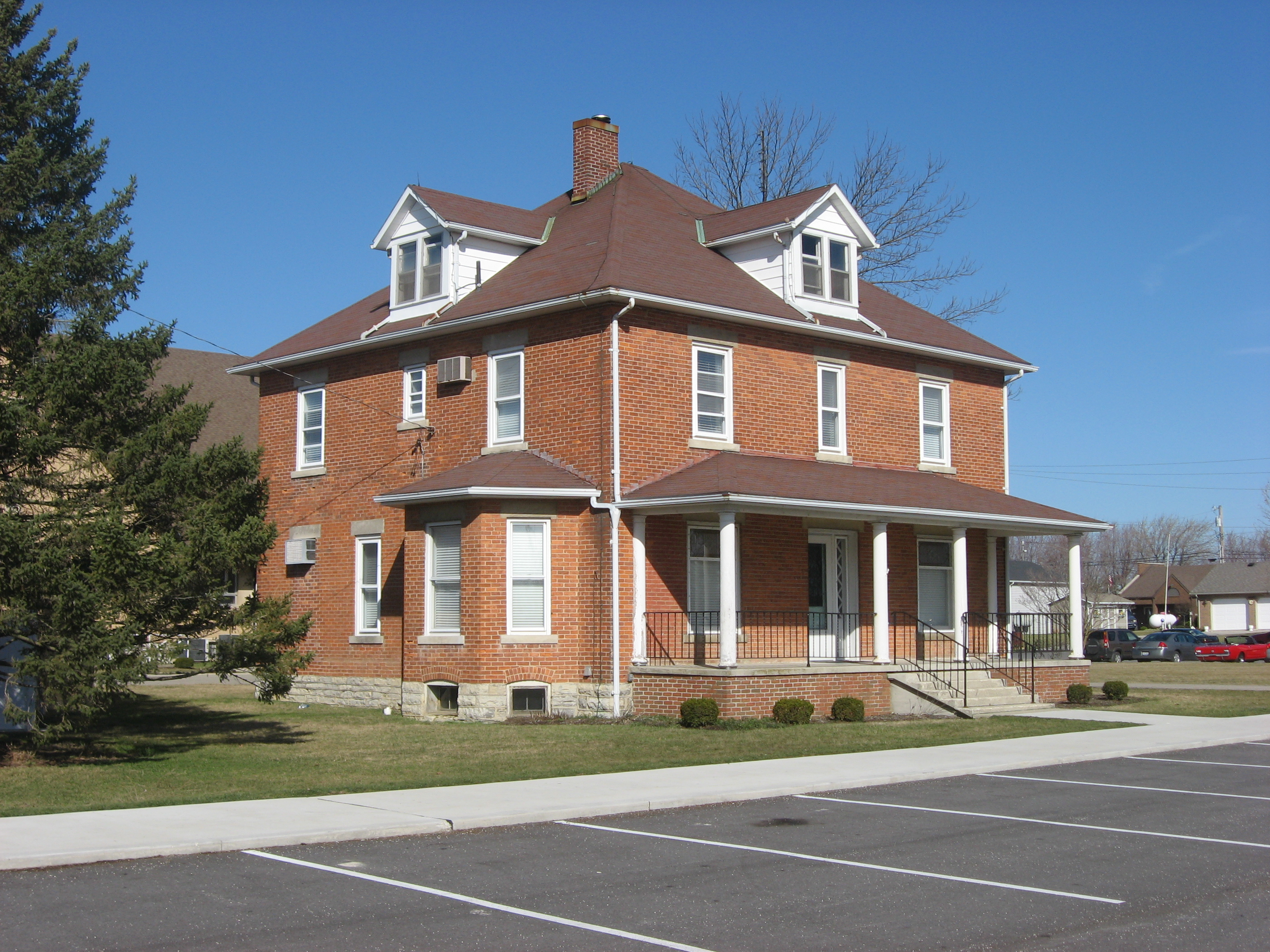
- Front and side of the rectory

- Location within Ohio Location within the United States
- Location: Maple St., Chickasaw, Ohio
- Coordinates: 40°26′10″N 84°29′35″W
- Area: less than one acre
- Built: 1904
- Architect: DeCurtins
- Architectural style: Italianate
- MPS: Cross-Tipped Churches of Ohio TR
- NRHP reference No.: 79002848
- Added to NRHP: July 26, 1979

Precious Blood Catholic Church is a Roman Catholic parish in Chickasaw, Ohio, United States. Erected in 1903 and still an active parish, the church historically owned two buildings constructed in its early years that have been designated as historic sites.

== Early parish history ==
Chickasaw's first Catholics attended Mass at St. Sebastian's Church, nearly 2 miles (3.2 km) to the northwest. In 1897, the Chickasaw members erected a small church in their village for use as a chapel of ease during the week. Because the villagers typically did not own horses, they found it difficult to reach St. Sebastian's, and sympathy grew for attempting to form their own parish; accordingly, in January 1903, the parishioners from Chickasaw left the church and took their possessions with them. Little more than one week later, St. Sebastian's was destroyed by a fire (now seen as highly suspicious), and parishioners were faced with the decision of rebuilding the church. Ultimately, the parish was split into two parts: the remnant members of St. Sebastian's rebuilt their church, while the chapel in Chickasaw became the parish church for the newly formed Church of the Precious Blood. Fifty-eight families composed the parish's charter membership.

The parishioners quickly began to expand their facilities. Before the end of 1903, the chapel had been expanded, and the following year saw the construction of a brick rectory at a cost of about $4,000. Membership grew rapidly; by 1907, the congregation had grown from thirty-eight families to seventy. In 1908, the church decided to erect a parish school, located across the street from its rectory.

Precious Blood Church is one of the youngest Catholic parishes in Mercer County; only Our Lady of Guadalupe Church in Montezuma and St. Theresa of the Infant Jesus Church in Rockford are newer; Our Lady parish was only a mission when Precious Blood was established, and St. Theresa parish was created in 1936.

== Buildings ==
=== Church ===
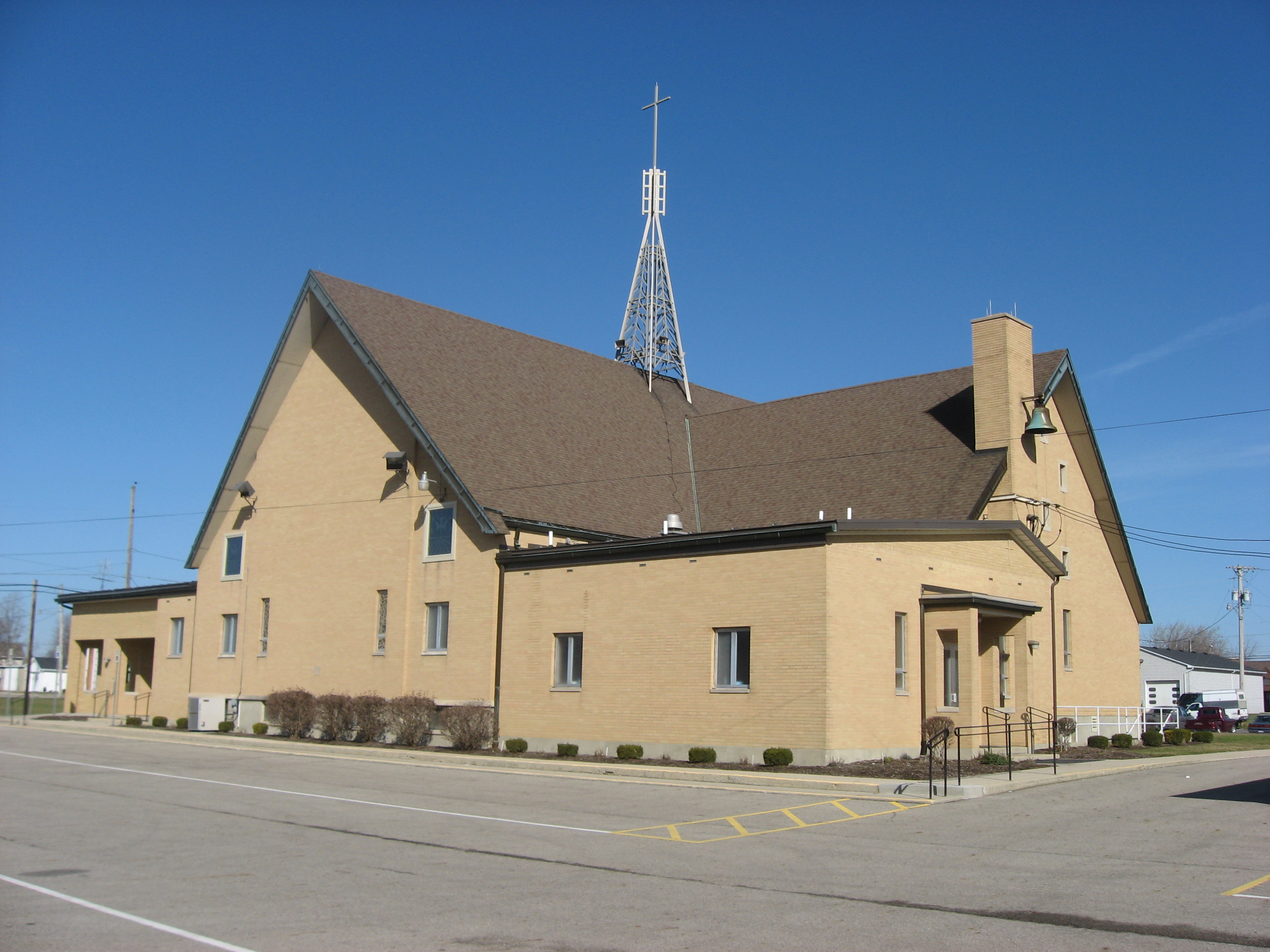
Side and rear of the church

The first parish church building, originally a parish hall and then the chapel of ease, was built on a stone foundation in 1894 and 1895. Soon after the parish was established in 1903, a wooden addition was built onto the church; the reworked building was painted and new windows installed by early July of that year. As the parish's membership grew after World War II, the old building was strained to hold the increased number of worshippers, and plans were laid for a replacement structure. Ground was broken for the new building in late 1965, and the structure was dedicated on February 23, 1967. This church is a brick structure built in the shape of a cross and equipped with a basement; its sanctuary has room for over four hundred worshippers.

=== School ===
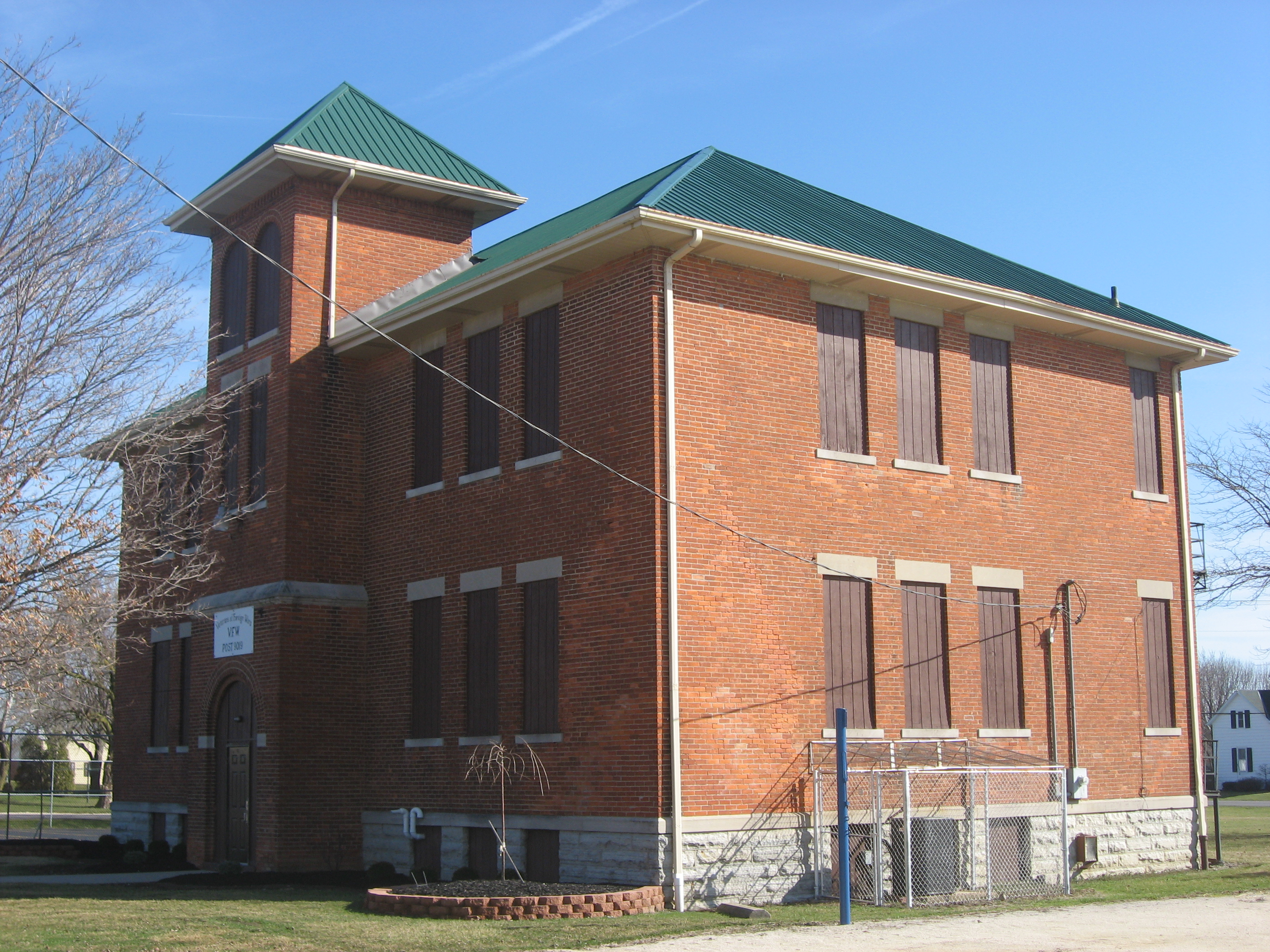
Precious Blood School

The Precious Blood School is a two-story brick structure that is supported by a foundation of ashlar. Built in the Italianate style by the DeCurtins brothers, it features a central square bell tower that rises above the rest of the building. Individuals enter the building through double doors that are topped by an elliptical fanlight.

Late in the 1950s, the Ohio General Assembly enacted a law that provided for free high school education for all Ohio students. Because of this law, Chickasaw's public school system merged with that of the surrounding Marion Township, and the parish school closed. The parish has since sold the building; it is owned by a local organization of the Veterans of Foreign Wars.

=== Rectory ===
Like the school, the Precious Blood Rectory is a square, two-story brick structure built on an ashlar foundation. Featuring more of a vernacular style of architecture, the house is topped with a hip roof that is pierced by dormer windows on all four sides. Its front door is surrounded by a veranda built with wooden columns and surrounded with a railing. Many parishes in the region built rectories in the early twentieth century in response to a directive issued by the Archdiocese of Cincinnati, which provided that each parish should house its own pastor. The Chickasaw rectory is typical of these structures, which predominantly are two-story rectangles with hip roofs and verandas. It is believed that this common design was influenced by the style made popular by the Sears Roebuck catalogue.

== Recent history ==
=== Historic recognition ===
In 1979, the rectory and the former school were listed on the National Register of Historic Places. Deemed historic because of their well-preserved architecture and their contributions to Ohio's history, they were among over thirty different places in far western Ohio related to the Society of the Precious Blood that were listed on the National Register together. Although most of these buildings were churches, several rectories and schools were included as well. The tall, Gothic Revival towers featured by many of these churches have become the namesake for this region of western Ohio, which is nicknamed the "Land of the Cross-Tipped Churches."

=== Present status ===
Today, Precious Blood is an active parish of the Archdiocese of Cincinnati. It is clustered with four other Marion Township parishes – St. John the Baptist in Maria Stein, Nativity of the Blessed Virgin Mary in Cassella, St. Rose in St. Rose, and St. Sebastian in Sebastian – to form the Marion Catholic Community. Two priests serve the cluster as pastors: Eugene Schnipke and Tom Brenberger. The entire cluster is part of the St. Marys Deanery.
