= St. John the Baptist Catholic Church (Maria Stein, Ohio) =

Church in Ohio, United States

- Maria Stein Catholic Church and Rectory
- U.S. National Register of Historic Places
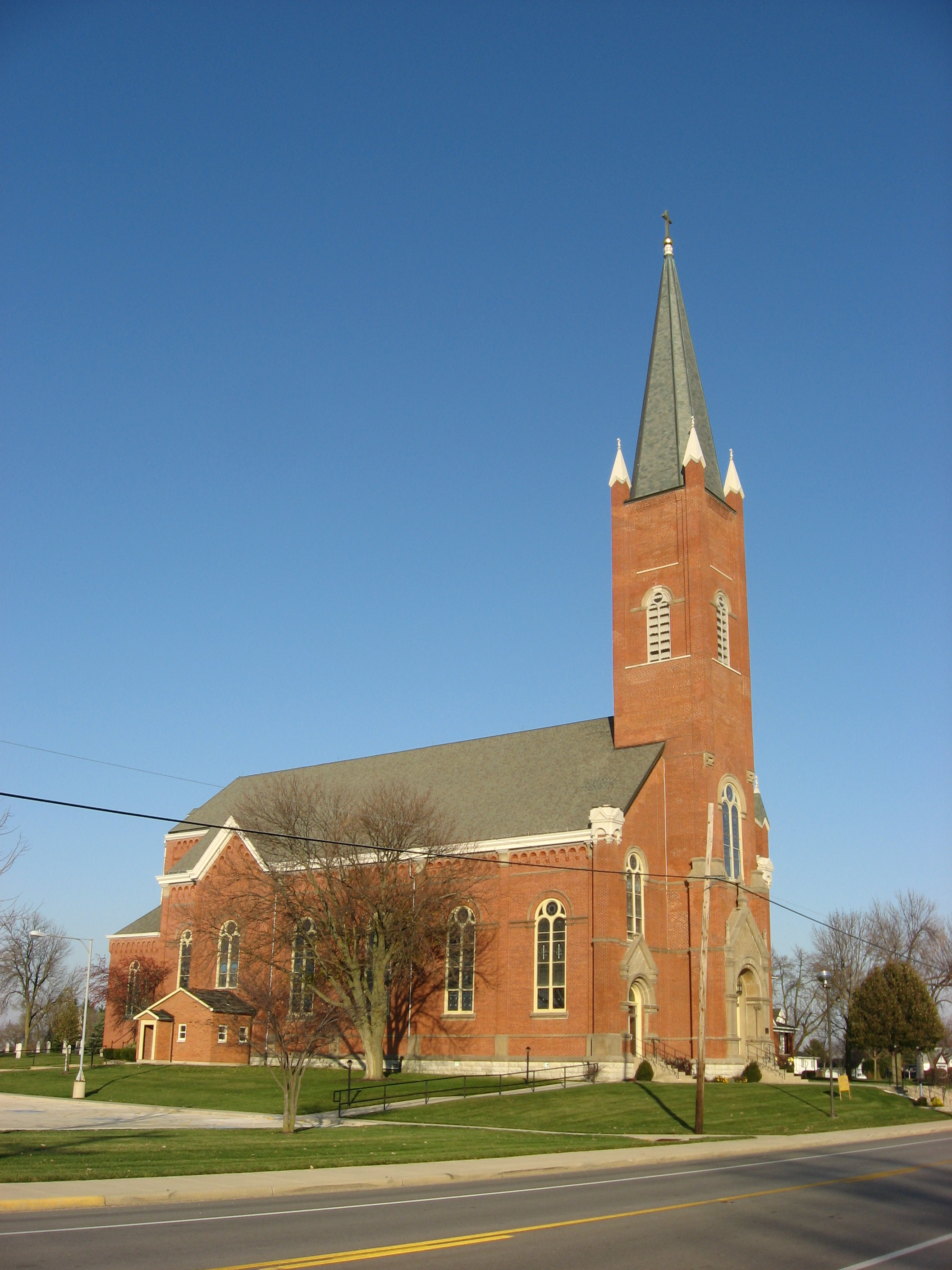
- Front and side of the church

- Location within Ohio Location within the United States
- Location: St. John's Rd. and State Route 119
- Nearest city: Maria Stein, Ohio
- Coordinates: 40°24′29″N 84°28′22″W
- Area: 1 acre (0.40 ha)
- Built: 1889
- Architect: Adolphus Druiding; Contractor: Anton DeCurtins
- Architectural style: Romanesque Revival
- MPS: Cross-Tipped Churches of Ohio TR
- NRHP reference No.: 79002828
- Added to NRHP: July 26, 1979

St. John the Baptist Catholic Church is a historic Roman Catholic church in Marion Township, Mercer County, Ohio, United States. Located in the unincorporated community of Maria Stein, it is the home of an active congregation and has been recognized as a historic site because of its well-preserved late nineteenth-century Romanesque Revival architecture. The church was destroyed by a fire and declared a total loss during renovations in 2025.

== Parish history ==
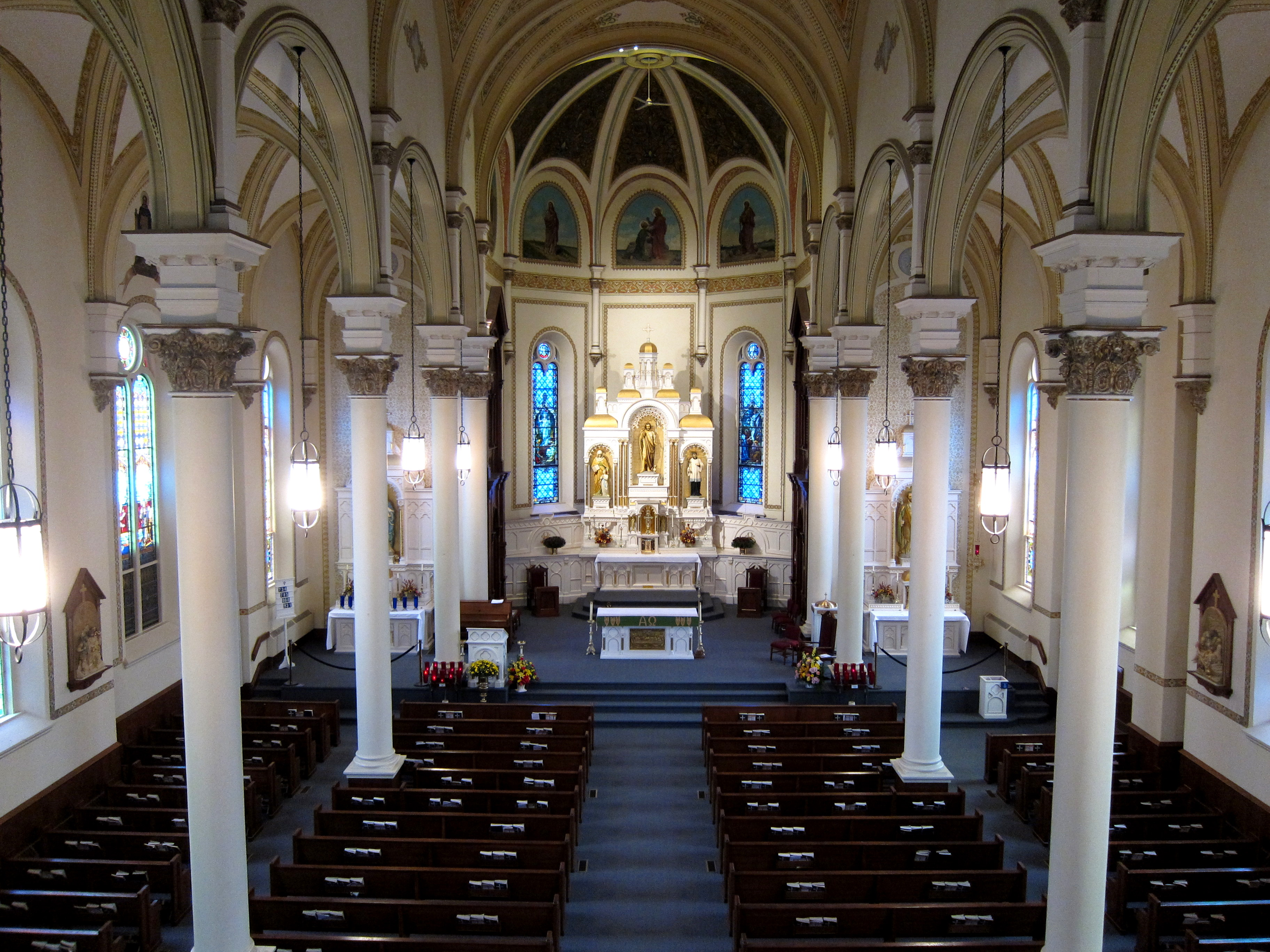
Church interior as viewed from the loft

The community of St. Johns was established in 1833. When the Cincinnati, Hamilton, and Dayton Railway expanded through Mercer County some years later, its surveyors chose a path through the small community of Maria Stein, to the west of St. Johns. As these two communities were separated by only 0.5 miles (0.80 km), business interests migrated to the vicinity of the railroad, and the two communities eventually merged under the name of Maria Stein.

Large numbers of Catholics from northern Europe settled in southern Mercer County and surrounding regions in the early nineteenth century because of the activities of the Society of the Precious Blood in the region. The center of the society's activities was the Maria Stein Convent, located less than 1 mile (1.6 km) north of St. Johns. From this convent was derived the name of the community.

St. John the Baptist Parish was founded in St. Johns in 1837 by priests of the Society from the village of Minster to the east; at that time, it was dedicated to John the Baptist. A small log church was erected to house the congregation, but the number of parishioners soon grew to the point that it was inadequate to house the congregation. Accordingly, a brick church was built to replace the log structure. As the membership continued to grow, multiple additions were built onto the original structure. By the 1880s, the parish had decided to replace the old brick church entirely with a yet larger building. The new and current church was built between 1888-1894 using 135,000 bricks and at a total cost of $43,354.19 paid from a building fund and special collections (Approx. $1.5 Million in 2022 dollars).

Today, St. John's remains an active parish of the Archdiocese of Cincinnati. It is part of the Marion Catholic Community cluster, along with Precious Blood parish in Chickasaw, Nativity of the Blessed Virgin parish in Cassella, St. Rose parish in St. Rose, and St. Sebastian parish in Sebastian. The entire cluster is a part of the St. Marys Deanery.

== Architecture ==
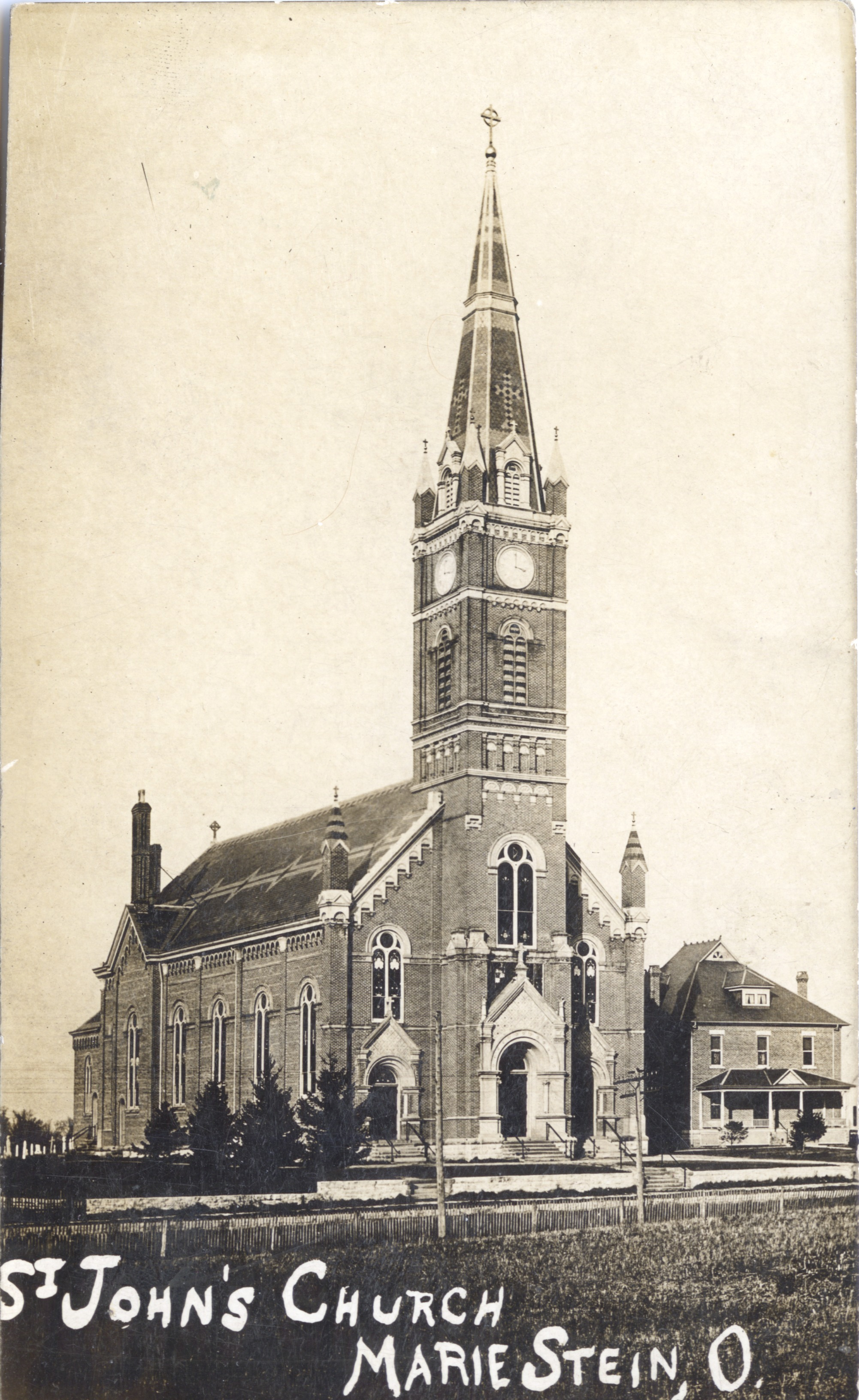
St. John the Baptist Church as it appeared before exterior renovation

The current St. John's Church was completed in 1888 at a cost of $40,145. Its architecture, which has been ranked among the leading churches of Mercer County, features a massive tower that was designed to house four tower clocks. Large amounts of sandstone are used to trim the corners of the brick church, which can be entered through three doors at the base of the tower. The church is built on a stone foundation and is topped with a gabled roof of asphalt. Many rounded lancet windows of stained glass illuminate the interior; among the most prominent of its windows are those of the sacristy, which feature deep blue stained glass. The church's heavily decorated interior includes elaborate altars and a reredos built in the Romanesque Revival style.

A renovation project in the 1960s removed many of the exterior decorative features, including tops of the side pilasters, trim on the rounded windows and tower, and border around the upper exterior nave. The church interior has not been renovated as extensively.

Architectural historians have divided the Precious Blood-related churches of western Ohio into four generations. St. John's is typical of the churches of the third generation, which are generally Gothic Revival structures with a single central tower. It was designed by German-born architect, Adolphus Druiding (1838-1899) of Chicago and built by Anton DeCurtins (1829-1895) of nearby, Carthagena.

== Related buildings ==
Two different Catholic schools have been operated by the parish. Its high school building (now demolished), erected in 1930, was built on the opposite side of State Route 119 from the church; after some years as a high school, it was converted into an elementary school. An earlier school, established and closed on unknown dates, was formerly operated in association with St. John's Church. In 1907, this school's 200 students were taught by the Sisters of the Precious Blood.

Located immediately to the east of the church is a rectory, built in 1906. Designed by the DeCurtins Brothers in a combination of architectural styles, its walls are built of brick, laid in a stretcher bond; the square structure rests on a stone foundation and is covered by a slate roof that is pierced by multiple dormer windows. In addition to its buildings, the parish maintains a cemetery adjacent to the church.

== Preservation and 2025 fire ==
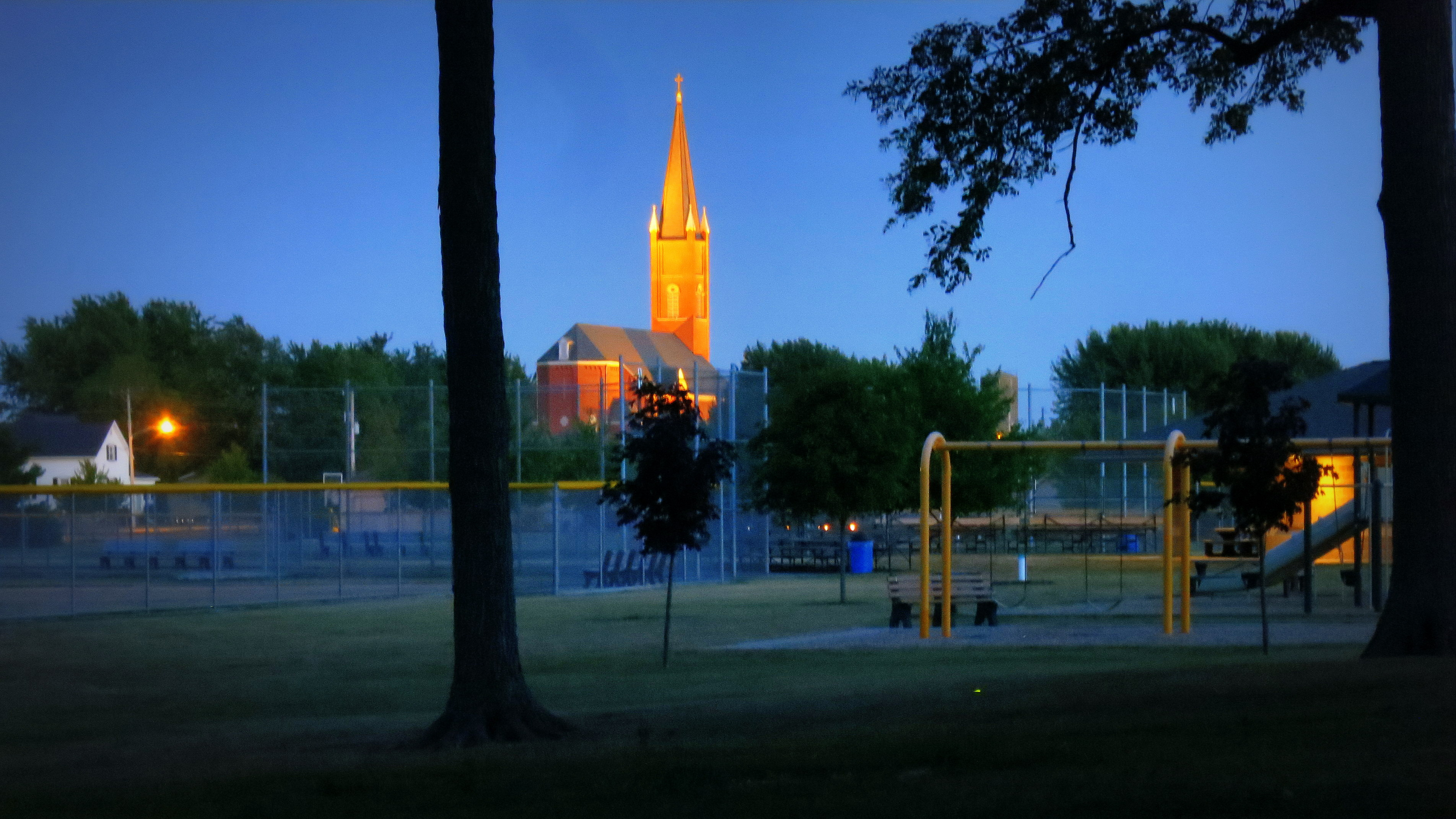
St. John the Baptist Church at twilight, as viewed from the Shrine of the Holy Relics park.

In 1977, St. John's Church and its associated rectory were recorded by the Ohio Historic Inventory, a historic preservation program of the Ohio State Historic Preservation Office. This architectural survey ranked both buildings in good condition with no threats to their historic integrity. Two years later, the church and rectory were listed together on the National Register of Historic Places because of their architectural significance. More than thirty other buildings in western Ohio related to the Society of the Precious Blood were listed on the National Register at the same time as part of a multiple property submission. These historic buildings, both churches and other church-related structures, are the namesake of the region of rural western Ohio known as the "Land of the Cross-Tipped Churches." St. John's Church lies in the middle of this heavily Catholic area, just 1/2 mile (0.80 km) away from its center at the Maria Stein Convent.

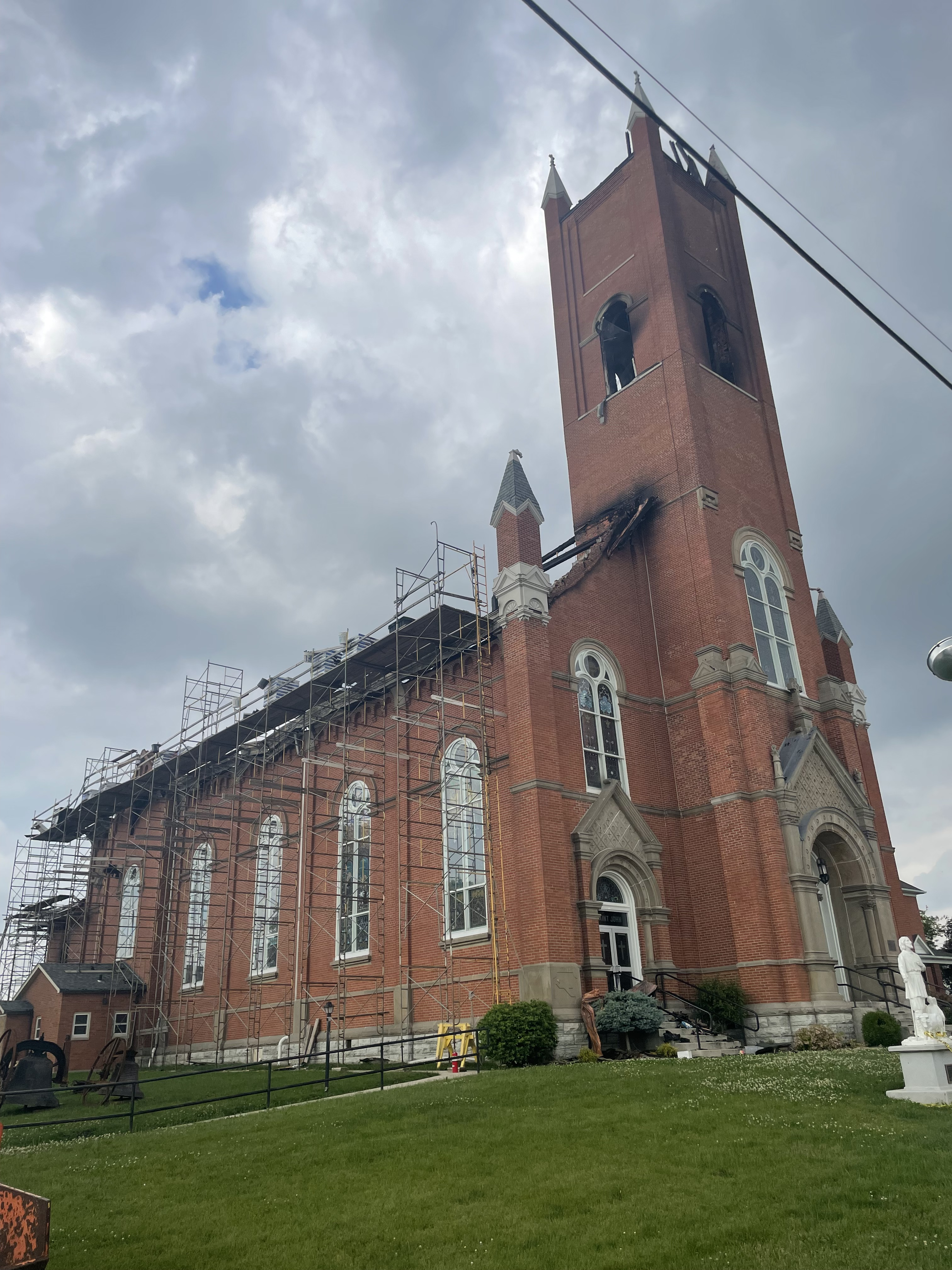
View of roof and steeple damage following the 2025 fire at St. John the Baptist.

On the afternoon of May 29, 2025, the church was gutted in a fire which toppled the steeple and collapsed the roof. The roof of the building was being repaired at the time following wind damage, but the cause of the fire was unclear. Restorationists stated following the incident that "more could be saved than meets the eye", as the brick walls of the church remained undamaged by the fire.

In December 2025, the west wall of the remaining structure collapsed due to high winds, which compromised the remaining walls. It was decided that demolition was necessary due to the potential for the tower to collapse onto the nearby state highway. Demolition began in January 2026.
