= St. Sebastian's Catholic Church (Sebastian, Ohio) =

- St. Sebastian Catholic Church and Rectory
- U.S. National Register of Historic Places
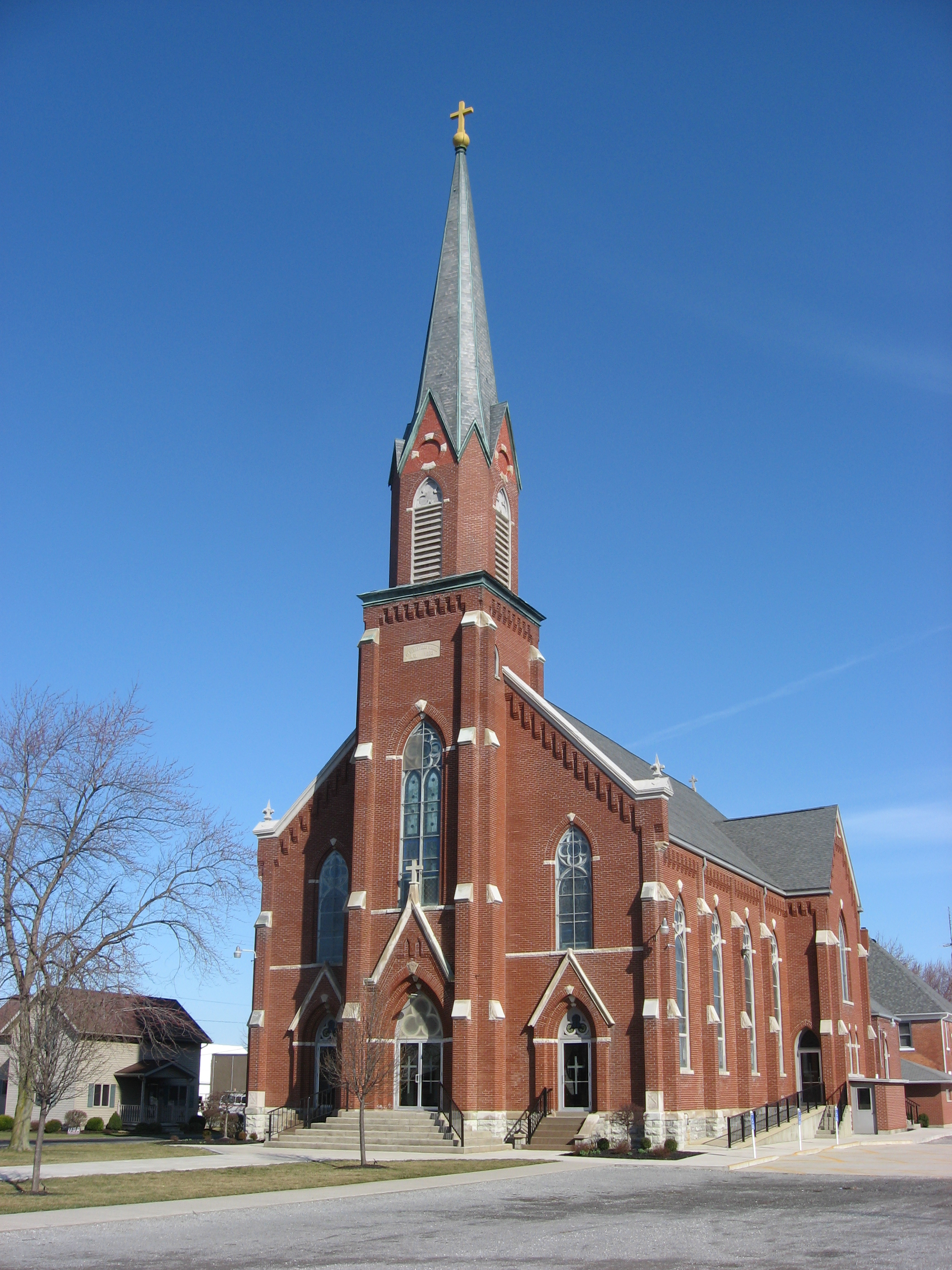
- Front and eastern side of the church

- Location within Ohio Location within the United States
- Location: Sebastian Rd. and County Road 716-A, Sebastian, Ohio
- Coordinates: 40°26′39″N 84°31′0″W
- Area: 0 acres (0 ha)
- Built: 1904
- Architect: Andrew De Curtins
- Architectural style: Gothic Revival
- MPS: Cross-Tipped Churches of Ohio TR
- NRHP reference No.: 79002830
- Added to NRHP: July 26, 1979

St. Sebastian's Catholic Church is a historic Roman Catholic church in Marion Township, Mercer County, Ohio, United States. Located in the unincorporated community of Sebastian, it is the home of an active congregation and has been declared a historic site because of its well-preserved early twentieth-century Gothic Revival architecture.

== Parish history ==
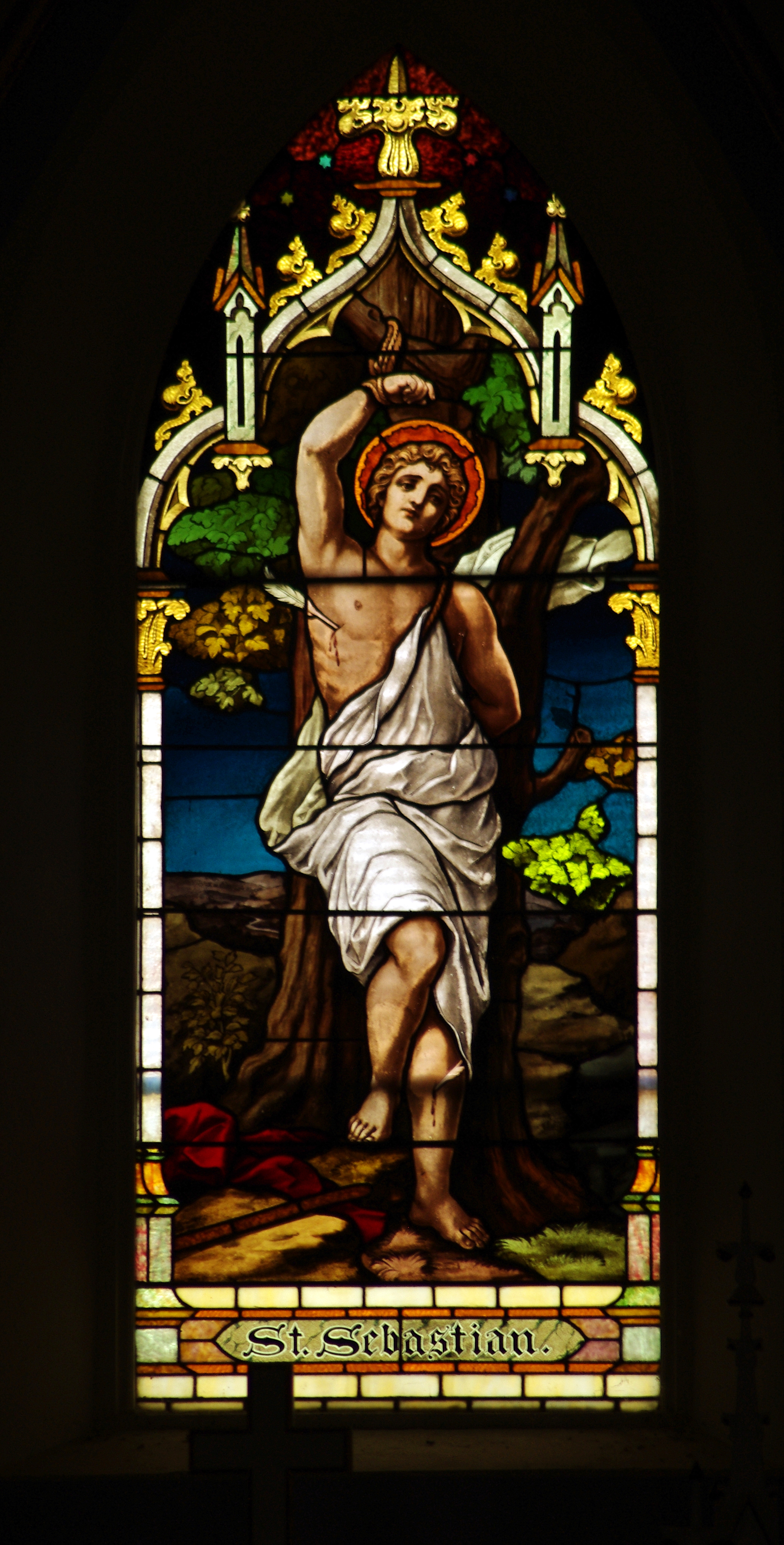
A stained glass window located above the church sanctuary which depicts the sufferings of St. Sebastian.

Dedicated to third-century martyr Saint Sebastian, the parish was established in 1852 from territory that had been part of St. Rose and St. John the Baptist parishes. By the end of the following year, its members constructed a church building that would serve the parish for twenty-five years; a frame structure, it was built under the direction of an African American man named Coratus. This structure served the parish until a replacement brick church was completed in October 1879; a rectangle measuring 45 feet (14 m) by 85 feet (26 m), it cost $4,000 to build and was considered by some to be the finest church in Mercer County. Anton DeCurtins was instrumental in this building's history: he designed it, added its pipe organ, and expanded it in 1894.

Some of the parish's members lived in the village of Chickasaw, nearly 2 miles (3.2 km) to the southeast. During the 1890s, movements grew among the Chickasaw members for the creation of a separate parish; they built a parish hall in 1894 and succeeded in having it declared a chapel of ease in the following year. Unrest between the Catholics of Chickasaw and the parish's other members culminated with the destruction of the church: on January 12, 1903, soon after many of the Chickasaw parishioners separated from St. Sebastian's, the church and its contents were burned to the ground. In the aftermath of the fire, an investigation was conducted under the supervision of Archbishop Elder. Although the fire was deemed suspicious, a separate parish was created in Chickasaw as a result of the fire, while St. Sebastian parish began the construction of a new church in 1904; it remains standing today.

Since its creation, St. Sebastian's has been ministered to by priests of the Society of the Precious Blood. Today, St. Sebastian's remains an active parish of the Archdiocese of Cincinnati. It is part of the Marion Catholic Community cluster, along with Precious Blood parish in Chickasaw, Nativity of the Blessed Virgin parish in Cassella, St. Rose parish in St. Rose, and St. John the Baptist parish in Maria Stein. The entire cluster is a part of the St. Marys Deanery.

== Architecture ==
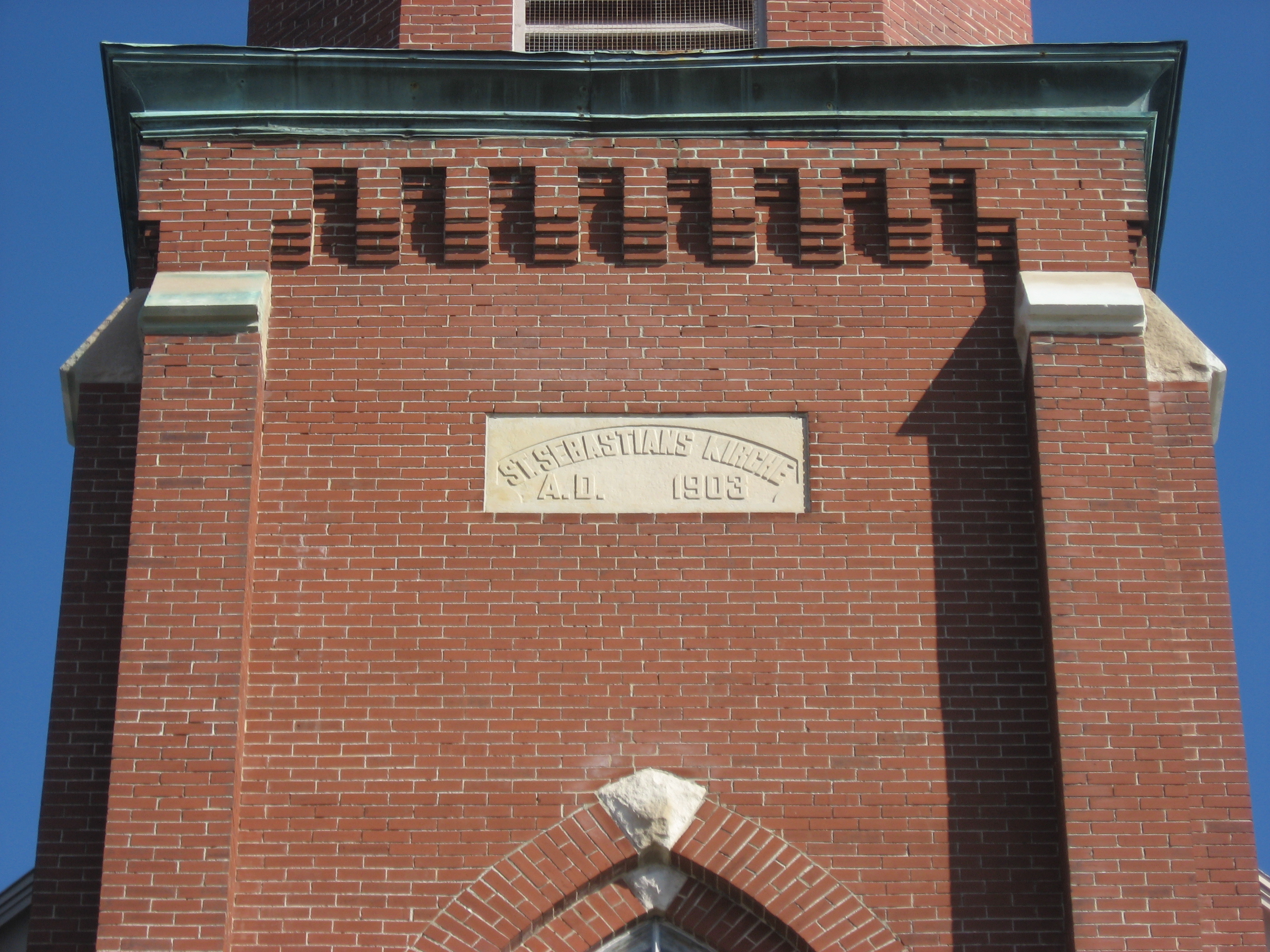
Detail of the front of the tower

Andrew DeCurtins, Anton's son, was chosen as the architect for the new structure; he employed stone for the foundation, pressed brick (laid in a stretcher bond) for the walls, and slates for the roof. The entire building is a very tall structure; its vertical features are highlighted by elements such as the sandstone trim on the buttresses. Although the building is only one story high, it includes a tall steeple with a belfry and topped with a four-sided spire. Worshippers enter the building through a doorway in the tower's base; the transom features tracery crowned with sandstone. Inside, the church is equipped with a basement, while its most impressive feature is a vaulted ceiling decorated with multiple High Gothic Revival reredos. A rectangle 113 feet (34 m) long and 52 feet (16 m) wide, the church was built on the site of the previous structure.

Architectural historians have divided the Precious Blood-related churches of western Ohio into four generations. St. Sebastian's is typical of the churches of the third generation, which are generally Gothic Revival structures with a single central tower. It is one of six extant churches from this period that were designed by the DeCurtins family.

== Surrounding areas ==
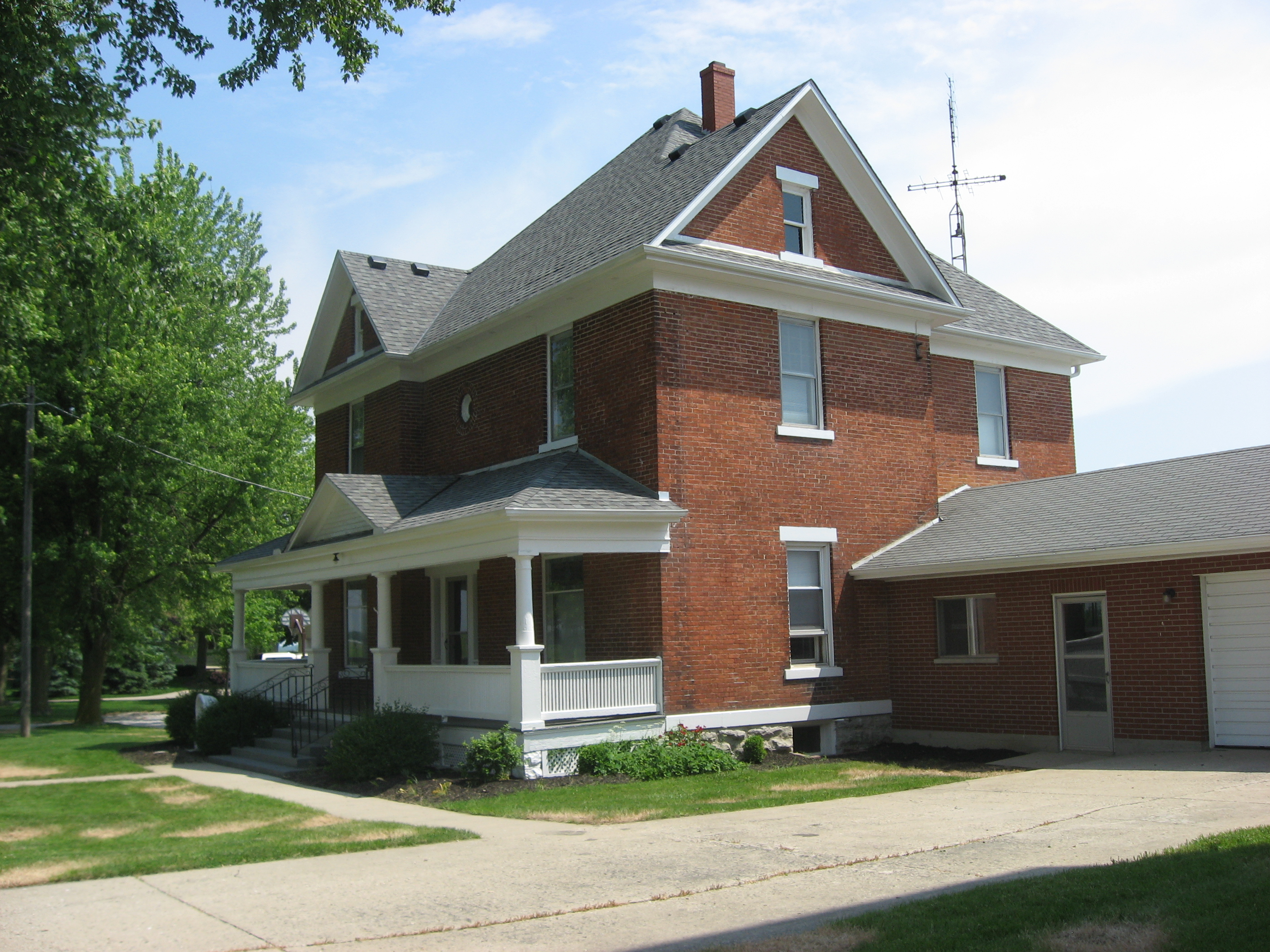
St. Sebastian's Rectory

During the early years of the twentieth century, the Archdiocese of Cincinnati required each parish to construct a rectory for its parish priest. St. Sebastian's Church arranged for the building of a rectory in 1905; it cost approximately $4,000. Like the church, this rectory was designed by the DeCurtins family. A two-story brick house, it is typical of period rectories in its region; like St. Sebastian's, these structures are typically rectangles with hip roofs and equipped with verandas. Two of its most elaborate features are a heavily ornamented entrance, decorated with stained glass and multiple transoms, and a central rose window that illuminates the second floor. Its foundation is built of ashlar, and its walls are laid in a stretcher bond, like those of the church. Although the rectory remains in a condition similar to the time of its construction, it has been expanded; a single room and a garage have been attached to its southern end, between the old part of the house and the rear of the church.

Some areas of lesser-used land border the church. A parish cemetery is located nearby, while the distance between the front door and Sebastian Road is lined with small trees. The community of Sebastian is very small, causing the church to appear almost as if it were alone in the countryside. Among the few nearby buildings is an old house located adjacent to the church property's eastern boundary; it is believed to have been built during the 1850s as a general store.

== Recognition ==
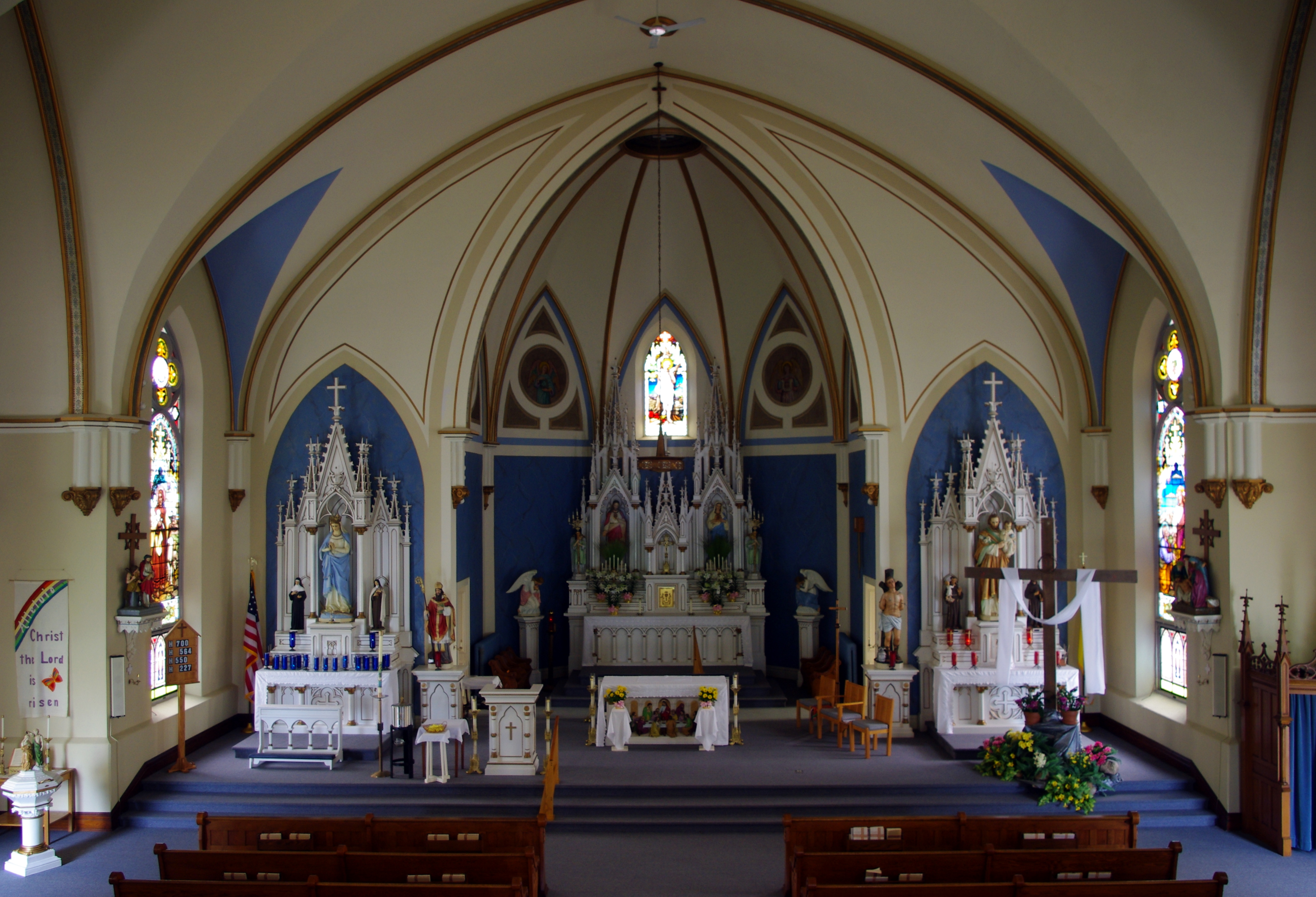
The church nave as viewed from the loft.

St. Sebastian's Church was recorded by a historic preservation program, the Ohio Historic Inventory, in 1977. This architectural survey ranked both the church and the rectory in good condition without any significant threats to their historic integrity, and the church was deemed eligible for addition to the National Register of Historic Places. Both buildings were listed together on the Register in 1979, along with over thirty other properties in far western Ohio related to the Society of the Precious Blood. Many of these buildings were churches or rectories, including at least one building owned by each of the six parishes in the Marion Catholic Community. The tall Gothic Revival architecture of many churches in this part of far western Ohio has become the namesake of this region, which is nicknamed the "Land of the Cross-Tipped Churches."
