= Ohio State Route 716 =

State highway in western Ohio, US

State Route 716

Route information
- Maintained by ODOT
- Length: 6.71 mi (10.80 km)
- Existed: 1937–present

Major junctions
- South end: SR 705 in Osgood
- North end: SR 274 in Chickasaw

Location
- Country: United States
- State: Ohio
- Counties: Darke, Mercer

Highway system
- Ohio State Highway System; Interstate; US; State; Scenic
← SR 715	→ SR 718

State Route 716 (SR 716) is a state highway in the western part of the U.S. state of Ohio. Its southern terminus is at SR 705 in the village of Osgood in northeastern Darke County. The northern terminus of SR 716 is at SR 274 in the village of Chickasaw in southeastern Mercer County. For its entire length, SR 716 runs parallel to, and approximately four miles (6.4 km) to the east of, U.S. Route 127.

The highway was assigned in 1937 on a routing from SR 705 in Osgood to an unnumbered highway in Franklin Township. The route was truncated to its current northern terminus in 1973. SR 716 has remained intact ever since.

== Route description ==
SR 716 begins at an intersection with SR 705 in the Darke County village of Osgood. The highway heads northward through downtown Osgood and then into the rural regions, which includes spontaneous residential homes and fields. Not far after Osgood, SR 716 intersects with Township Road 7 (Darke-Mercer County Line Road), which runs along the county line. The highway crosses the line into Mercer County and continues northward through rural areas. There is an intersection with a local road, Indian Trail Road, soon after.

The highway remains mainly unchanged for a little while until it nears the Marion Township village of Maria Stein. It then passes Marion Local High School. In Maria Stein, it intersects SR 119. Through Maria Stein, the highway is more urbanized, with more homes and commercial buildings surrounding the highway. However, this is only for a short time, as SR 716 leaves Maria Stein after the intersection with SR 119. The route continues northward for a short distance into Chickasaw, where it terminates at SR 274.

== History ==
SR 716 was established in 1937. Its original path consisted of its entire current routing, SR 274 between Chickasaw and one mile (1.6 km) west of Chickasaw in Marion Township, Mercer County, and a currently unnumbered road from Marion Township to one mile (1.6 km) east of Montezuma in Franklin Township.

In 1973, SR 716 was scaled back on the north end to its current northern terminus at SR 274 in Chickasaw. The road went westward at the intersection with SR 274, and went on a short concurrency before turning off for the north. It continued to its then northern terminus. The former stretch of SR 716 from Chickasaw to Marion Township was re-numbered as SR 274, and the stretch from Marion Township to Franklin Township was deleted from the state highway system.

== Major intersections ==
County	Location	mi	km	Destinations	Notes
Darke	Osgood	0.00	0.00	SR 705 (Main Street) / North Street	
Mercer	Marion Township	4.69	7.55	SR 119	
Mercer	Chickasaw	6.71	10.80	SR 274 (Franklin Street) / Roosevelt Street	
1.000 mi = 1.609 km; 1.000 km = 0.621 mi
