= Gruenwald Convent =

- U.S. National Register of Historic Places
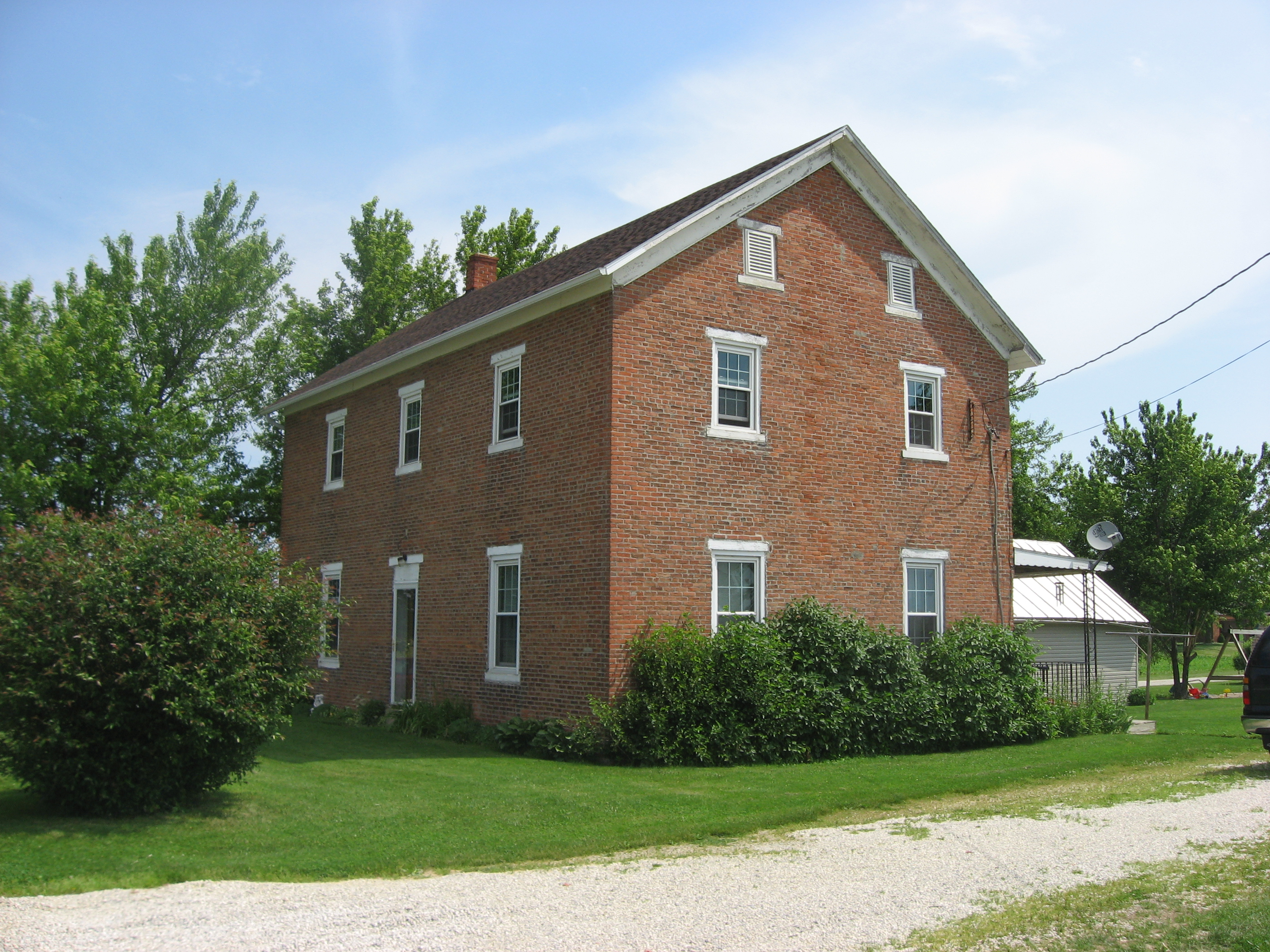
- Front and side of the convent

- Location within Ohio Location within the United States
- Nearest city: Cassella, Ohio
- Coordinates: 40°24′1″N 84°33′3″W
- Area: 0 acres (0 ha)
- Built: 1854
- MPS: Cross-Tipped Churches of Ohio TR
- NRHP reference No.: 79002813
- Added to NRHP: July 26, 1979

The Gruenwald Convent is a historic former Roman Catholic convent in the far western part of the U.S. state of Ohio. Located approximately 0.5 miles (0.80 km) south of the small community of Cassella in Mercer County, the convent was built in 1854. It is one of six convents that were built by the Missionaries of the Precious Blood in this portion of Ohio and in adjacent portions of far eastern Indiana, and one of only two that remain without significant alterations.

== History ==
Under the leadership of Francis de Sales Brunner, the Missionaries constructed six convents in southern Mercer County and surrounding areas between 1846 and 1856. Patterned after the monasteries that had housed the order's members in Europe, these convents were some of the most prominent buildings in the region — surrounded by small frame houses, these brick structures resembled fortresses. Five other convents were built: one affiliated with St. Augustine's Church in Minster, one affiliated with St. Joseph's Church in Egypt, the Himmelgarten convent near St. Henry, the Maria Stein Convent, and one affiliated with Holy Trinity Church in Trinity, Indiana. By the late 1970s, only the Gruenwald and Trinity convents remained in a condition resembling their original state: Himmelgarten was sold more than one hundred years ago, and has since been destroyed; the Minster convent likewise is no longer in existence; and the Egypt and Maria Stein convents had been significantly modified.

== Architecture ==
The Gruenwald Convent is a two-and-a-half story structure. Built on a stone foundation, its walls are brick, and it is covered by an asphalt roof. It is significantly smaller than some of the other convents of the region; for example, the Maria Stein Convent is a complex of seventeen buildings, some of which are much larger than the Gruenwald Convent. After the Gruenwald Convent ceased to be used for its original purpose, it was converted into a typical residence; consequently, it is also known as the "McDowell House".

== Historic status ==
In 1979, the Gruenwald Convent was one of more than thirty buildings added to the National Register of Historic Places as a part of a multiple property submission known as the "Cross-Tipped Churches of Ohio Thematic Resources." This collection included historically significant buildings in the vicinity of Maria Stein that were related to the Missionaries of the Precious Blood. The many massive Gothic Revival churches in this collection have become the namesake for the region, which is commonly known as the "Land of the Cross-Tipped Churches." The convent was listed on the Register both because of its contribution to the region's history and because of its connection to Francis de Sales Brunner.
