= Sebastian, Ohio =

Unincorporated community in Ohio, U.S.

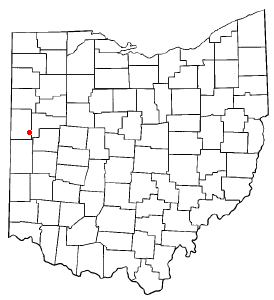

Sebastian (also St. Sebastian) is an unincorporated community in northern Marion Township, Mercer County, Ohio, United States. Its elevation is 932 feet (284 m), and it is located at 40°26′39″N 84°31′0″W (40.4442136, -84.5166205). Located at the intersection of Sebastian Road and County Road 716-A, the community lies south of the city of Celina, the county seat of Mercer County, and nearly 2 miles (3.2 km) northwest of the village of Chickasaw.

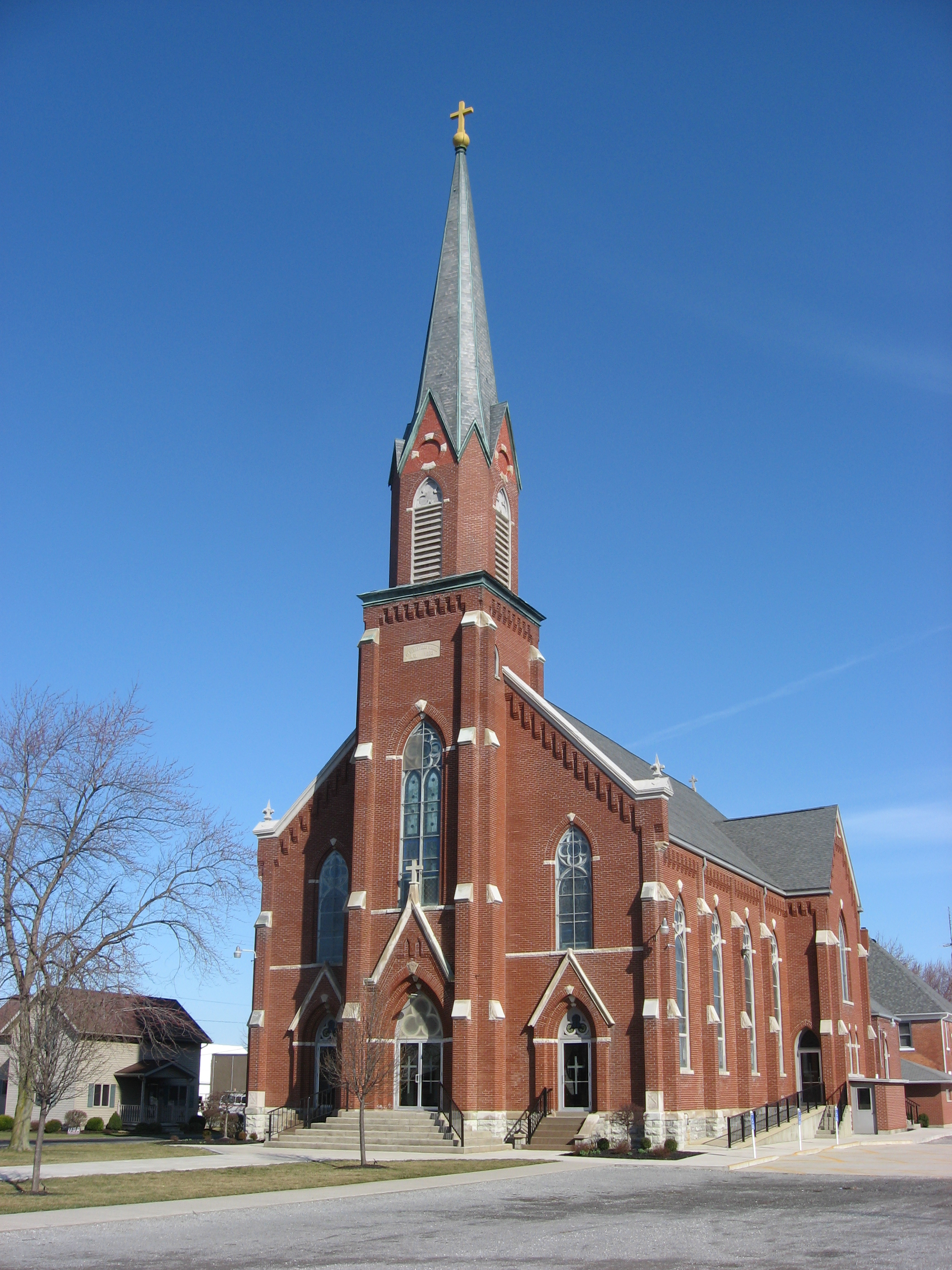
St. Sebastian's Catholic Church

By far the most significant building in the community is St. Sebastian's Catholic Church, located at the intersection of the two roads. Built in 1904, it is the parish's third building, erected to replace a church destroyed by fire. There are almost no buildings in Sebastian other than the church, which appears from a distance to be alone in the countryside. Among the few other buildings are a rectory owned by the church and a house that sits immediately to the east of the church's parking lot: it is believed to have been built during the 1850s as a general store. Beginning on 29 August 1882, Sebastian was the location of a post office; after the office closed on 15 June 1904, the community's mail was routed through the Celina post office.
