= St. Rose, Ohio =

Unincorporated community in Ohio, U.S.

Coordinates: 40°24′27″N 84°31′00″W

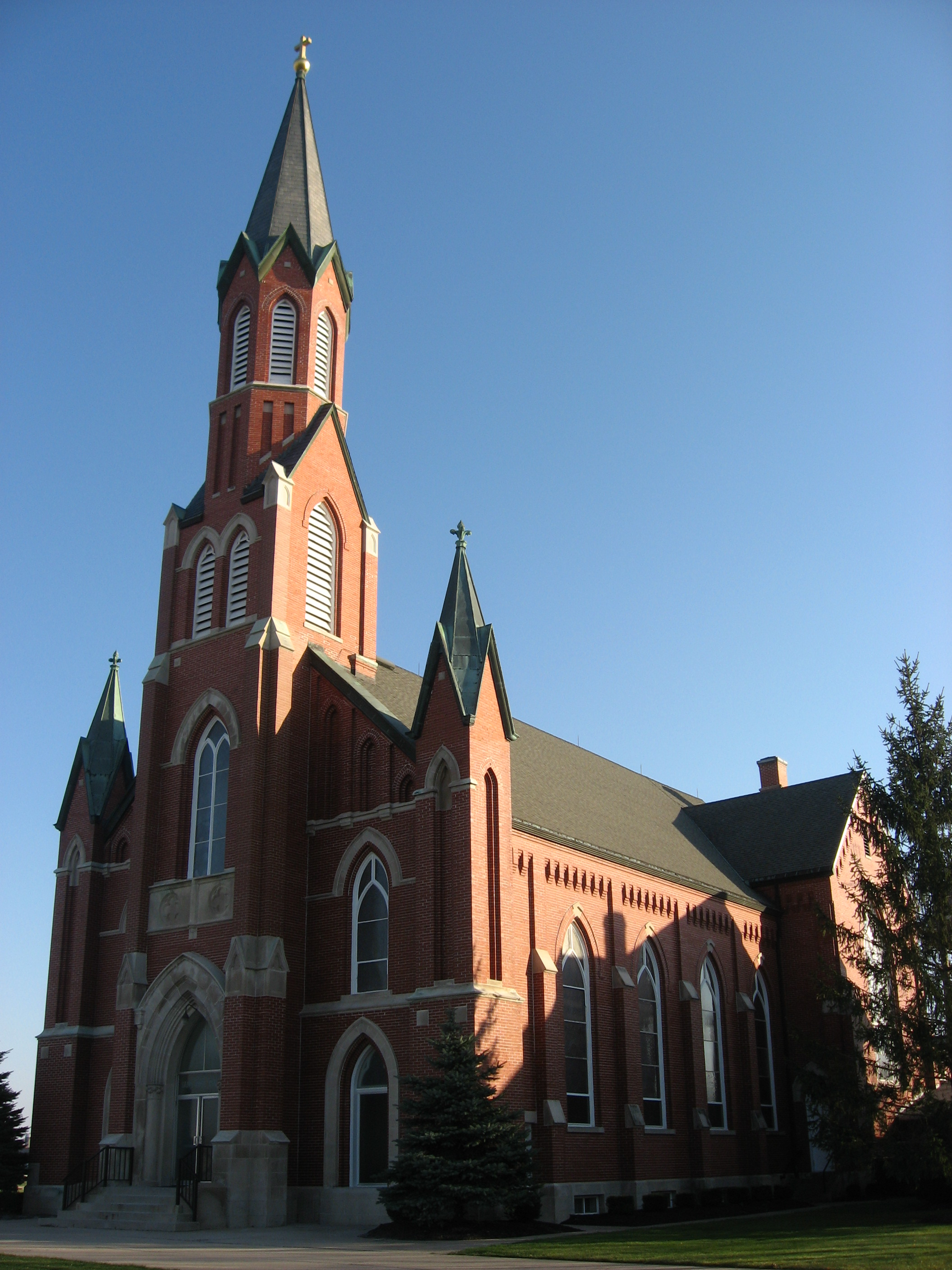
St. Rose's Catholic Church

St. Rose is an unincorporated community in Mercer County, in the U.S. state of Ohio.

== History ==
St. Rose was platted in 1854. A post office called Saint Rosa was established in 1878, and remained in operation until 1905.
