= Marion Township, Mercer County, Ohio =

Township in Ohio, US

- Township
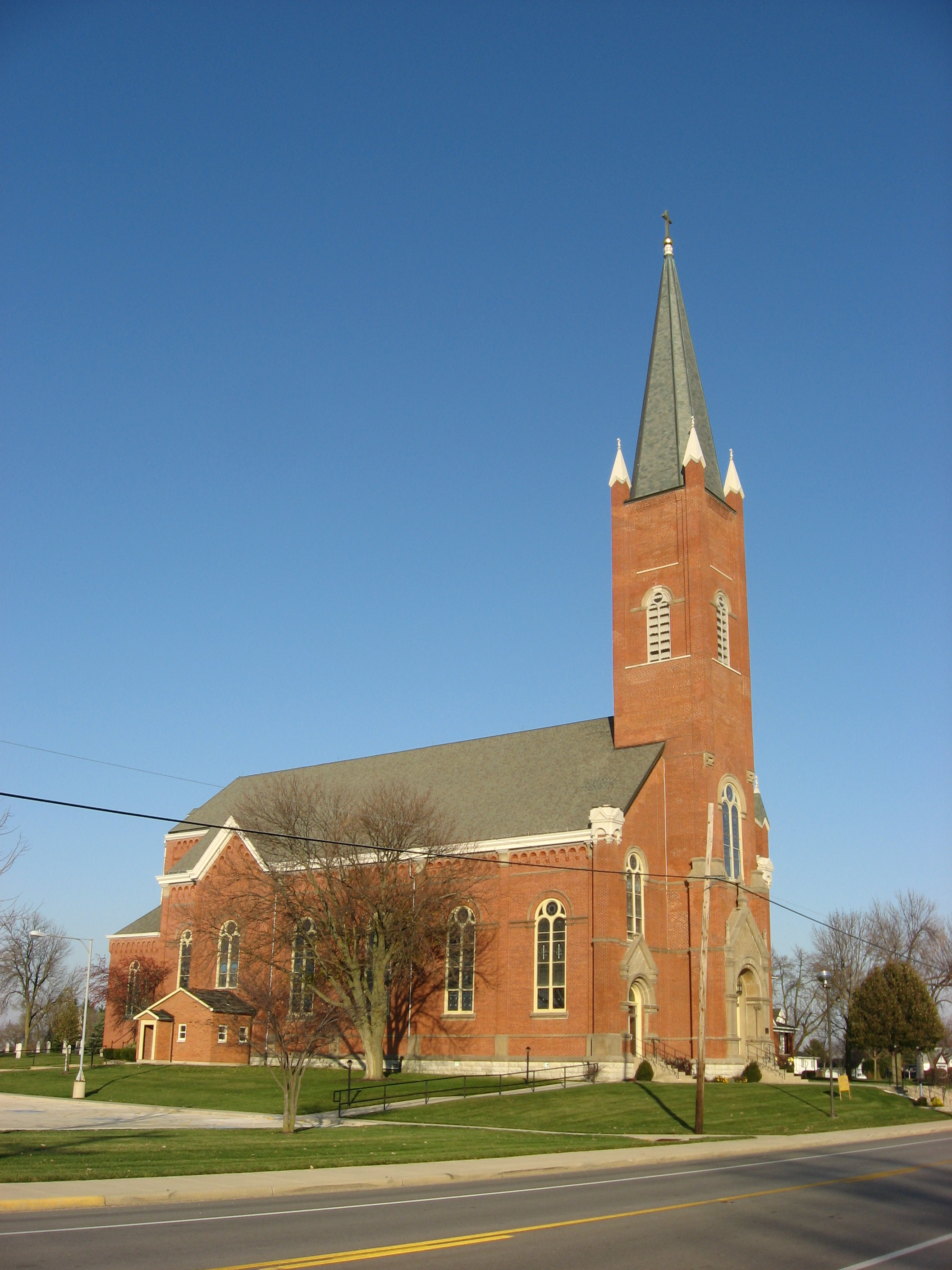
- St. John the Baptist Church at Maria Stein

- Location in Mercer County and the state of Ohio.
- Coordinates: 40°25′3″N 84°31′3″W
- Country: United States
- State: Ohio
- County: Mercer

Area
  - Total: 41.5 sq mi (107.4 km^{2})
  - Land: 41.5 sq mi (107.4 km^{2})
  - Water: 0 sq mi (0.0 km^{2})
- Elevation: 961 ft (293 m)

Population (2020)
  - Total: 3,322
  - Density: 80.11/sq mi (30.93/km^{2})
- Time zone: UTC-5 (Eastern (EST))
  - Summer (DST): UTC-4 (EDT)
- FIPS code: 39-47782
- GNIS feature ID: 1086630

Marion Township is one of the fourteen townships of Mercer County, Ohio, United States. The 2020 census found 3,322 people in the township.

== Geography ==
Located in the southeastern corner of the county, it borders the following townships:

- Franklin Township – north
- German Township, Auglaize County – northeast
- Jackson Township, Auglaize County – east
- McLean Township, Shelby County – southeast corner
- Patterson Township, Darke County – southeast
- Wabash Township, Darke County – southwest
- Granville Township – west
- Butler Township – northwest

The village of Chickasaw is located in northern Marion Township, and the unincorporated communities of Cassella, St. Rose, Maria Stein, and Sebastian lie in the western, central, and northwestern portions of the township respectively. Marion Local Schools and the historic Roman Catholic convent of the Sisters of the Precious Blood and the Shrine of the Holy Relics are located in Maria Stein.

== Name and history ==
It is one of twelve Marion townships statewide.

== Government ==
The township is governed by a three-member board of trustees, who are elected in November of odd-numbered years to a four-year term beginning on the following January 1. Two are elected in the year after the presidential election and one is elected in the year before it. There is also an elected township fiscal officer, who serves a four-year term beginning on April 1 of the year after the election, which is held in November of the year before the presidential election. Vacancies in the fiscal officership or on the board of trustees are filled by the remaining trustees.
