= Cassella, Ohio =

Unincorporated community in Ohio, U.S.

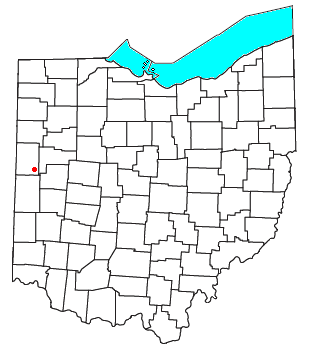
Approximate location of Cassella, Ohio

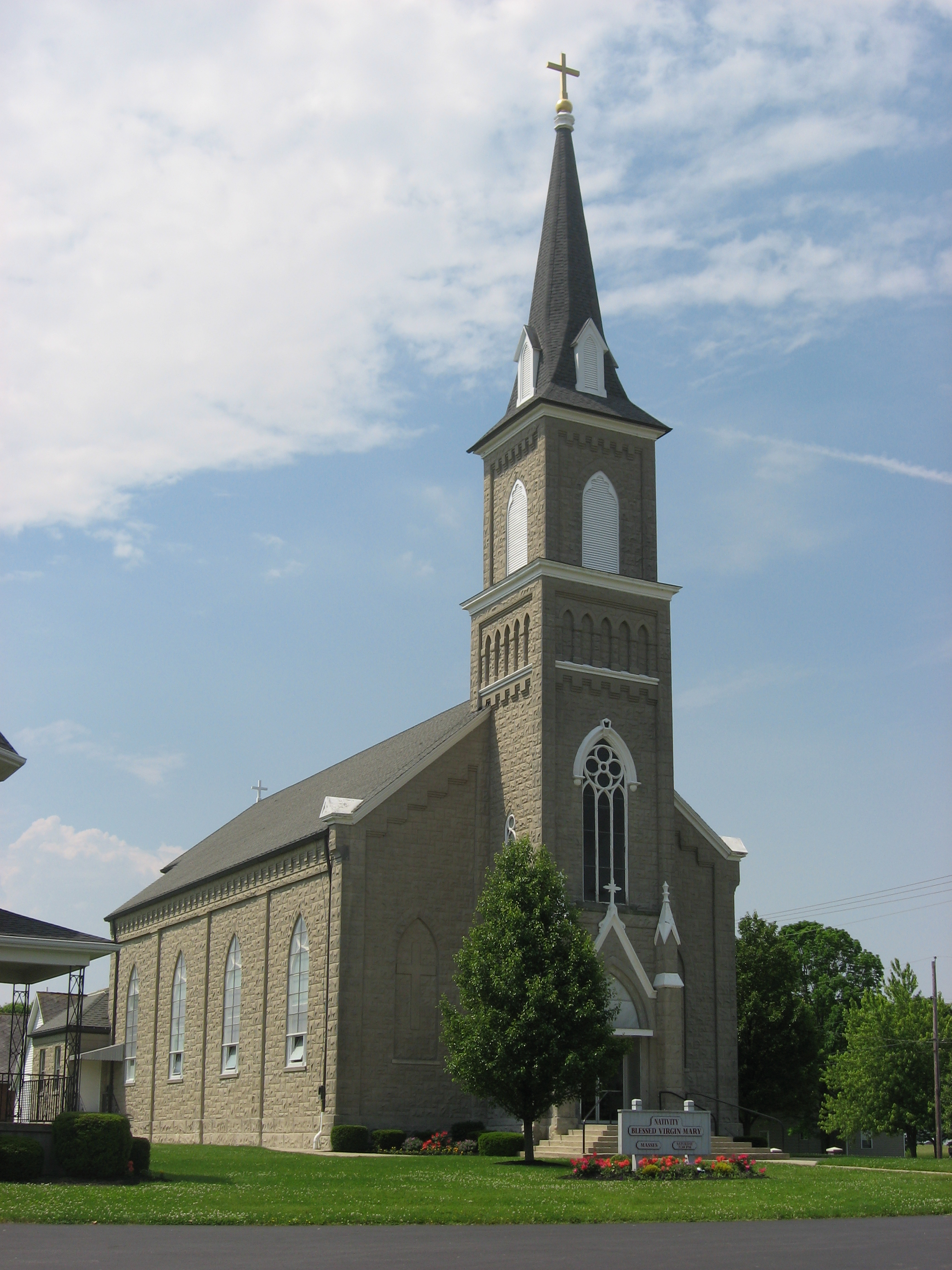
Nativity of the Blessed Virgin Mary Church

Cassella is an unincorporated community in Marion Township, Mercer County, Ohio, United States. Located at 40°24′22″N 84°33′8″W (40.4061581, -84.5521770), it lies at an elevation of 955 feet (291 m). Situated at the intersection of State Route 119 and Cassella-Montezuma Road in western Marion Township, it lies in the headwaters of Beaver Creek to the south of the city of Celina, the county seat of Mercer County. Other nearby communities include Maria Stein, 3 miles (4.8 km) to the east, Carthagena, 2 miles (3.2 km) to the north, and St. Henry, 4 miles (6.4 km) to the west.

Cassella lies in the Land of the Cross-Tipped Churches, a heavily Catholic region of rural far western Ohio that centers on Maria Stein. It grew up around the Nativity of the Blessed Virgin Mary Catholic Church, which was founded in 1847 and built its present building in 1858. The community's name is derived from the church, which was a mission in its earliest years; the community's German settlers called it "Cappella" (i.e. "chapel"), and this name was eventually corrupted to "Cassella." At various points in its history, the community has also been known as "Dogtown," "Frogtown," and "Marysville", and the current name has also been spelled "Cassela"; in 1963, the United States Board on Geographic Names ruled in favor of using "Cassella" as the official name.

A post office was established in Cassella on April 22, 1878, and served the community until its closure on June 15, 1905; after that time, the community's mail went through the post office in St. Henry. Two former parish schools are located near the church, and the community once possessed a system of public schools. One major event in Cassella's history was the near-total destruction of Nativity Church by fire in 1888; although the brick walls survived with damage, the interior was destroyed, and the walls were only repaired in 1915.

Today, Cassella remains a small community centered on Nativity Catholic Church. In 1979, the church and its rectory were listed on the National Register of Historic Places, along with many other Catholic churches and church-related buildings in the Land of the Cross-Tipped Churches.
