= Chickasaw, Ohio =

- Village
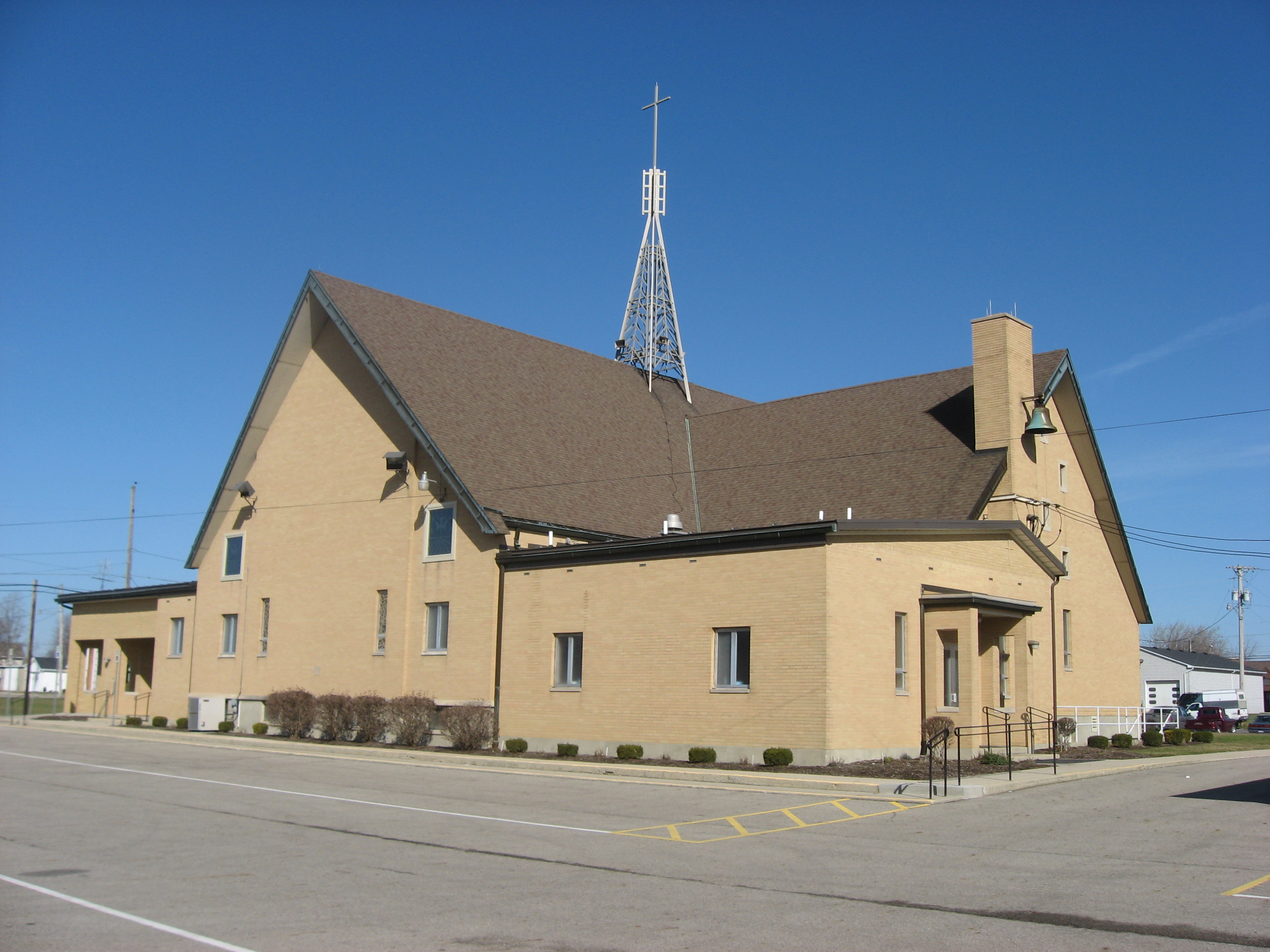
- Precious Blood Catholic Church

- Location in Mercer County and the state of Ohio.
- Coordinates: 40°26′11″N 84°29′38″W
- Country: United States
- State: Ohio
- County: Mercer
- Township: Marion

Area
  - Total: 0.24 sq mi (0.62 km^{2})
  - Land: 0.24 sq mi (0.62 km^{2})
  - Water: 0 sq mi (0.00 km^{2})
- Elevation: 942 ft (287 m)

Population (2020)
  - Total: 358
  - Estimate (2023): 350
  - Density: 1,490.8/sq mi (575.62/km^{2})
- Time zone: UTC-5 (Eastern (EST))
  - Summer (DST): UTC-4 (EDT)
- ZIP code: 45826
- Area code: 419
- FIPS code: 39-14156
- GNIS feature ID: 2397621

Chickasaw is a village in Mercer County, Ohio, United States. The population was 358 at the 2020 census.

== History ==
Chickasaw was laid out in 1838, and named after the Chickasaw tribe. A post office was established at Chickasaw in 1840. The village was incorporated in 1890.

== Geography ==
According to the United States Census Bureau, the village has a total area of 0.23 square miles (0.60 km^{2}), all land.

== Demographics ==
Historical population
Census	Pop.	Note	%±
1880	59		—
1900	310		—
1910	309		−0.3%
1920	214		−30.7%
1930	149		−30.4%
1940	141		−5.4%
1950	166		17.7%
1960	275		65.7%
1970	326		18.5%
1980	381		16.9%
1990	378		−0.8%
2000	364		−3.7%
2010	290		−20.3%
2020	358		23.4%
2023 (est.)	350	▼	−2.2%
U.S. Decennial Census

=== 2010 census ===
As of the census of 2010, there were 290 people, 122 households, and 80 families living in the village. The population density was 1,260.9 inhabitants per square mile (486.8/km^{2}). There were 131 housing units at an average density of 569.6 per square mile (219.9/km^{2}). The racial makeup of the village was 99.7% White and 0.3% from other races. Hispanic or Latino of any race were 0.3% of the population.

There were 122 households, of which 25.4% had children under the age of 18 living with them, 58.2% were married couples living together, 6.6% had a female householder with no husband present, 0.8% had a male householder with no wife present, and 34.4% were non-families. 30.3% of all households were made up of individuals, and 11.5% had someone living alone who was 65 years of age or older. The average household size was 2.38 and the average family size was 3.01.

The median age in the village was 42.3 years. 22.8% of residents were under the age of 18; 7.2% were between the ages of 18 and 24; 22.8% were from 25 to 44; 27.6% were from 45 to 64; and 19.7% were 65 years of age or older. The gender makeup of the village was 49.7% male and 50.3% female.

=== 2000 census ===
As of the census of 2000, there were 364 people, 136 households, and 96 families living in the village. The population density was 1,592.3 inhabitants per square mile (614.8/km^{2}). There were 139 housing units at an average density of 608.1 per square mile (234.8/km^{2}). The racial makeup of the village was 99.73% White, and 0.27% from two or more races. Hispanic or Latino of any race were 1.92% of the population.

There were 136 households, out of which 35.3% had children under the age of 18 living with them, 64.7% were married couples living together, 3.7% had a female householder with no husband present, and 29.4% were non-families. 27.2% of all households were made up of individuals, and 12.5% had someone living alone who was 65 years of age or older. The average household size was 2.68 and the average family size was 3.33.

In the village, the population was spread out, with 30.8% under the age of 18, 6.3% from 18 to 24, 27.2% from 25 to 44, 21.2% from 45 to 64, and 14.6% who were 65 years of age or older. The median age was 36 years. For every 100 females there were 110.4 males. For every 100 females age 18 and over, there were 104.9 males.

The median income for a household in the village was $42,188, and the median income for a family was $62,250. Males had a median income of $40,234 versus $27,188 for females. The per capita income for the village was $18,148. About 7.1% of families and 5.0% of the population were below the poverty line, including 2.2% of those under age 18 and 8.5% of those age 65 or over.

== Education ==
Chickasaw has a public library, a branch of the Mercer County District Library.
