= St. Nicholas Catholic Church, Frenchtown, Ohio =

Historic church in Ohio, United States

- St. Nicholas Catholic Church
- Location within Ohio
- Location: Frenchtown, Ohio
- Coordinates: 41.02930°N 83.34338°W
- Area: 6.617 acres (2.678 ha)
- Built: 1890
- Architectural style: Romanesque Revival
- Demolished: 2023

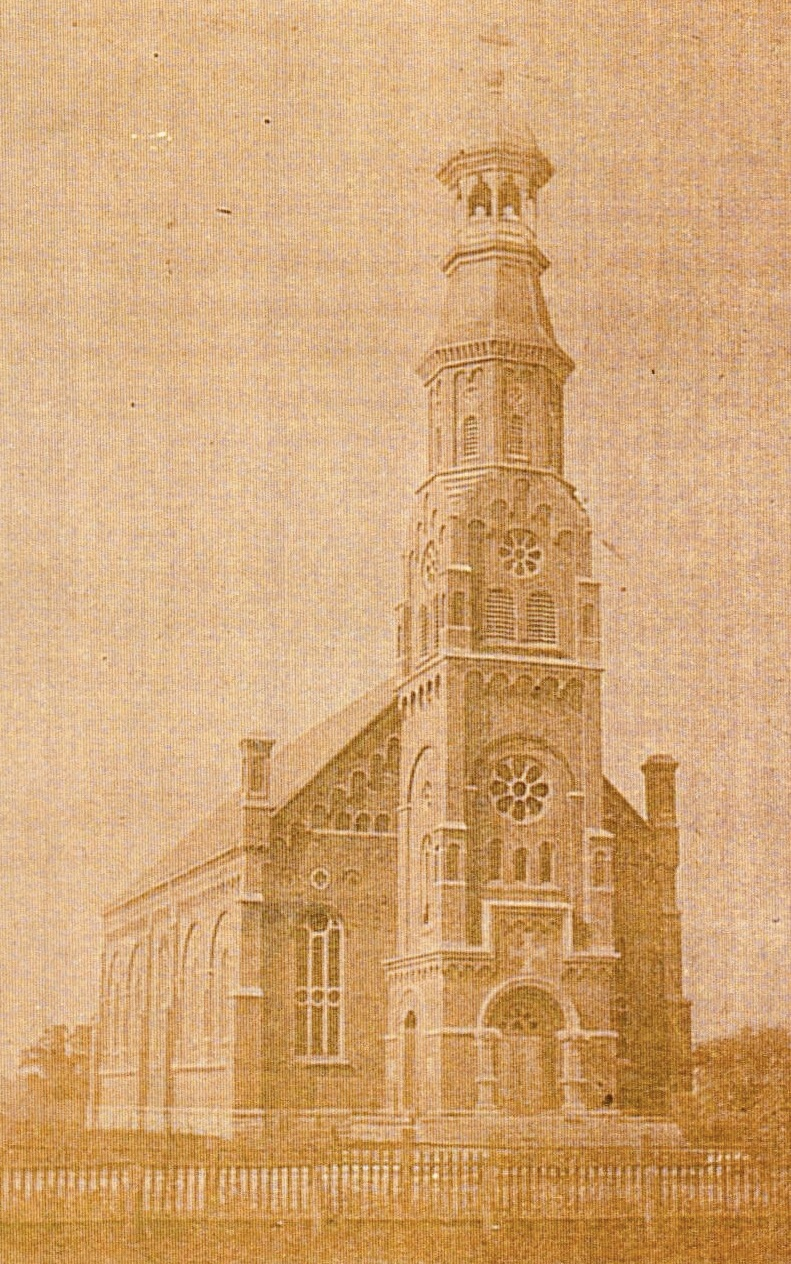
St. Nicholas Catholic Church, Frenchtown, Ohio, c. 1890

St. Nicholas Catholic Church was an historic church of the Roman Catholic Diocese of Toledo, located in Frenchtown, Ohio. The parish was founded in 1856, with the authorization of Bishop Amadeus Rappe of the Roman Catholic Diocese of Cleveland, to serve French-speaking Catholics who had immigrated to Northwest Ohio from Belgium and Luxembourg. The final Romanesque Revival church was completed in 1890. After 1910, the church was under the jurisdiction of the Roman Catholic Diocese of Toledo. The church was most well-known as the "mother church" of the Basilica and Shrine of Our Lady of Consolation in Carey, Ohio, and for over a half century it was administered by the Conventual Franciscan friars there.

== History ==
=== Early history ===
Early French-speaking immigrants of Big Spring Township were served by the Precious Blood priests of New Riegel, Ohio, who oversaw the construction of a log chapel. Local folklore speaks of the 1856 visit of French-speaking Cleveland Bishop Amadeus Rappe, who was purportedly led on a circuitous buggy ride to the site of the current church, and who approved the formation of a Roman Catholic community there. Rappe appointed the parish's first resident priest, Rev. Louis Molon, who began the construction of a brick church across the road from the chapel in 1856. Two two-story buildings were built shortly after the church: a rectory adjacent to the church (1864) and a schoolhouse on the site of the former chapel (1872). A two-story home, adjacent to the schoolhouse, was purchased in 1930 for use as a convent for the Sisters who taught at the school.

=== Connection to Our Lady of Consolation ===
In 1872, St. Nicholas birthed St. Edward mission church in Carey, Ohio, which would become the Basilica and National Shrine of Our Lady of Consolation. St. Nicholas became famous as the site from which a "miraculous" May 25, 1875 pilgrimage began, led by Rev. Joseph Gloden, with an image of Our Lady of Consolation that was brought from Luxembourg to be placed in what would become the Basilica and National Shrine of Our Lady of Consolation in Carey, Ohio.

=== Final church ===
The final church was built under the leadership of Rev. Mathias Arnoldi. Cleveland bishop Richard Gilmour blessed the cornerstone on October 9, 1887, and the church was dedicated on November 9, 1890.

The Frenchtown community was served by priests of the Cleveland Diocese until the creation of the Roman Catholic Diocese of Toledo in 1910. The Conventual Franciscan Friars of the Province of Our Lady of Consolation administered the parish from the 1949 through 2003. From 1911 through 1980, 250 to 500 people were regularly served by the church.

After a lightning strike in 1951, the bell tower was lowered.

In 2005, St. Nicholas Catholic Church was consolidated with St. Boniface Catholic Church in New Riegel, Ohio and Ss. Peter & Paul Catholic Church in Alvada, to form All Saints Catholic Church. After that time, the church was referred to as the St. Nicholas Chapel of All Saints Catholic Church. In December of 2022, the church building (along with nearby St. Peter's Chapel and St. Patrick's Chapel, also a part of All Saints Catholic Church in New Riegel) was placed on a demolition block under the Ohio Building Demolition and Site Revitalization Program. The church was demolished in late 2023, as documented by the Seneca County Historical Society.

== School ==
In 1872, a two-story schoolhouse was built on the site of the former log chapel. From 1882 to 1891, two Sisters of Notre Dame of Cleveland, Ohio served 66 to 100 pupils. After their departure, one lay teacher served 60 to 80 pupils through the school's temporary closing, due to lack of funds, in 1898. The school was also served for some time by the Franciscan Sisters of Tiffin, Ohio. In 1947, the school, which possessed 53 pupils, became a public school as part of the New Rigel School District. In 1949, the school was closed for safety reasons, and the building was demolished in 1955.
