= All Saints Catholic Church (New Riegel, Ohio) =

Historic church in Ohio, United States

- St. Boniface Roman Catholic Church, School, Rectory, and Convent of the Sisters of the Precious Blood
- U.S. National Register of Historic Places
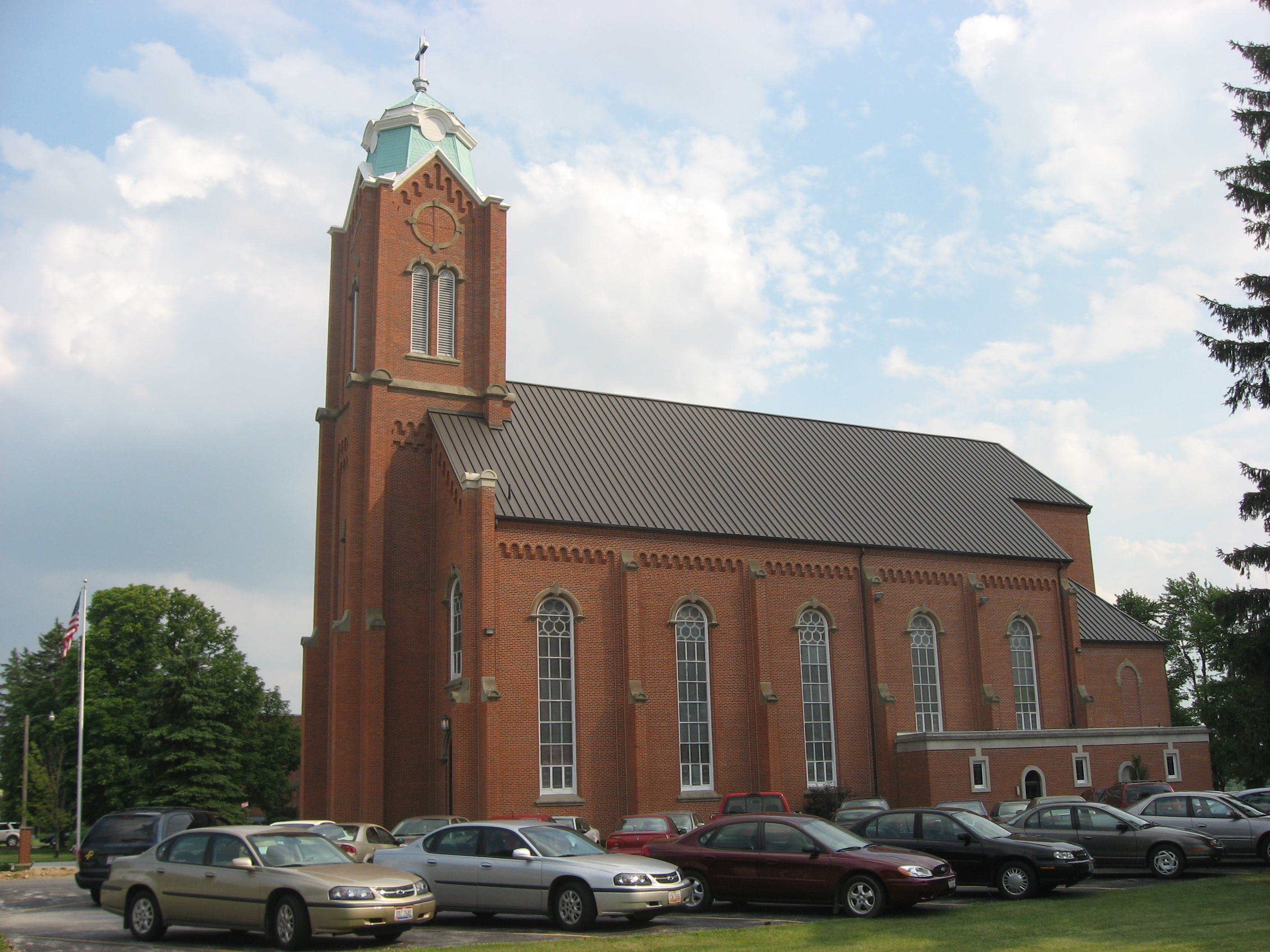
- The north side of the church in 2010

- Location within Ohio Location within the United States
- Location: N. Perry St., New Riegel, Ohio
- Area: 10 acres (4.0 ha)
- Architect: Bernard Kokenge
- Architectural style: Late Gothic Revival, Romanesque
- NRHP reference No.: 82001487
- Added to NRHP: 17 November 1982

All Saints Catholic Church is a Roman Catholic faith community comprising various historical communities, including St. Boniface Catholic Church in New Riegel, St. Nicholas Catholic Church in Frenchtown, and Ss. Peter & Paul Catholic Church in Alvada, Ohio. The community was constituted in 2005 when Bishop Leonard Blair of the Roman Catholic Diocese of Toledo consolidated these communities, leading to the closure of the churches in Frenchtown and Alvada. As a result of these closures, "All Saints" is now synonymous with what was previously known as St. Boniface Catholic Church and its associated rectory, convent, school and cemetery on North Perry Street in New Riegel, Ohio

== Description and history ==
The complex of facilities associated with the former St. Boniface Church include the church, rectory, school, cemetery chapel, and the former Convent of the Sisters of the Precious Blood, which was destroyed by a fire. These buildings were added to the National Register on November 17, 1982 as, "St. Boniface Roman Catholic Church, School, Rectory, and Convent of the Sister of the Precious Blood". The records of St. Boniface, St. Nicholas and Ss. Peter & Paul were microfilmed by the Bowling Green State University Center for Archival Collections in 2001.

== See also ==
- Historic preservation
- Catholic Church
- Saint Boniface

== Photo gallery ==
Photographs of the All Saints Catholic Church
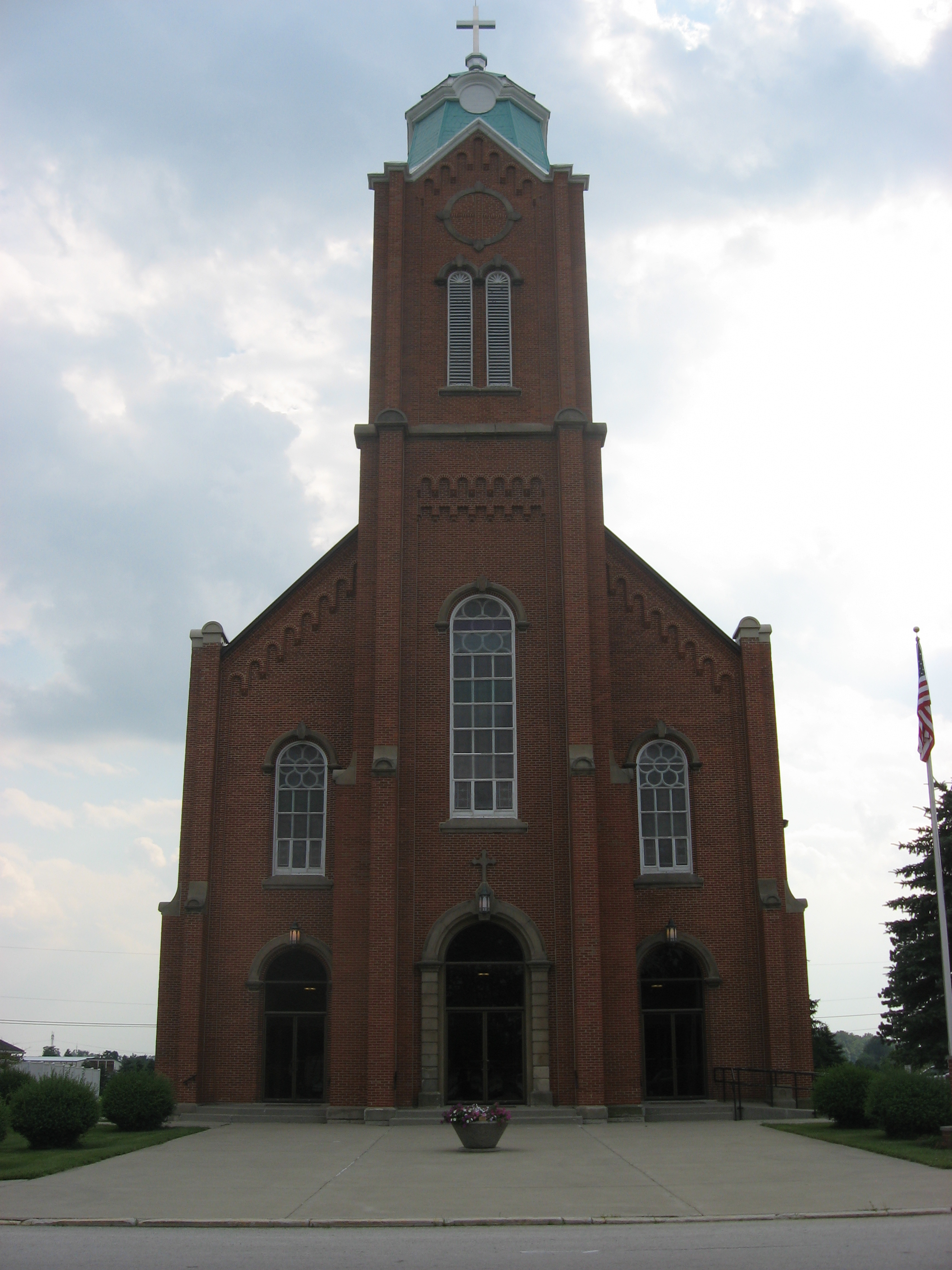
Facade, east elevation in 2010

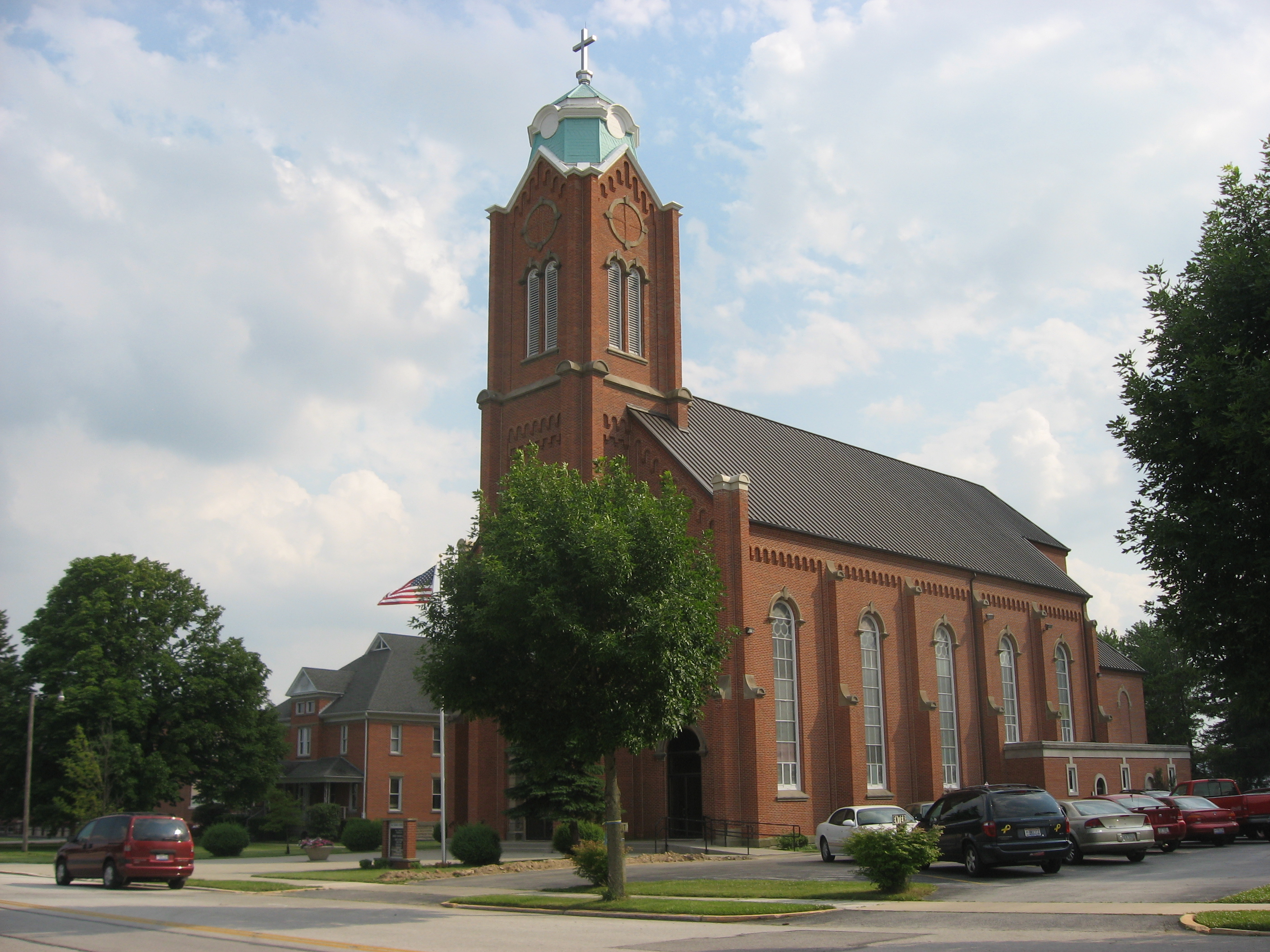
Facade and north side in 2010

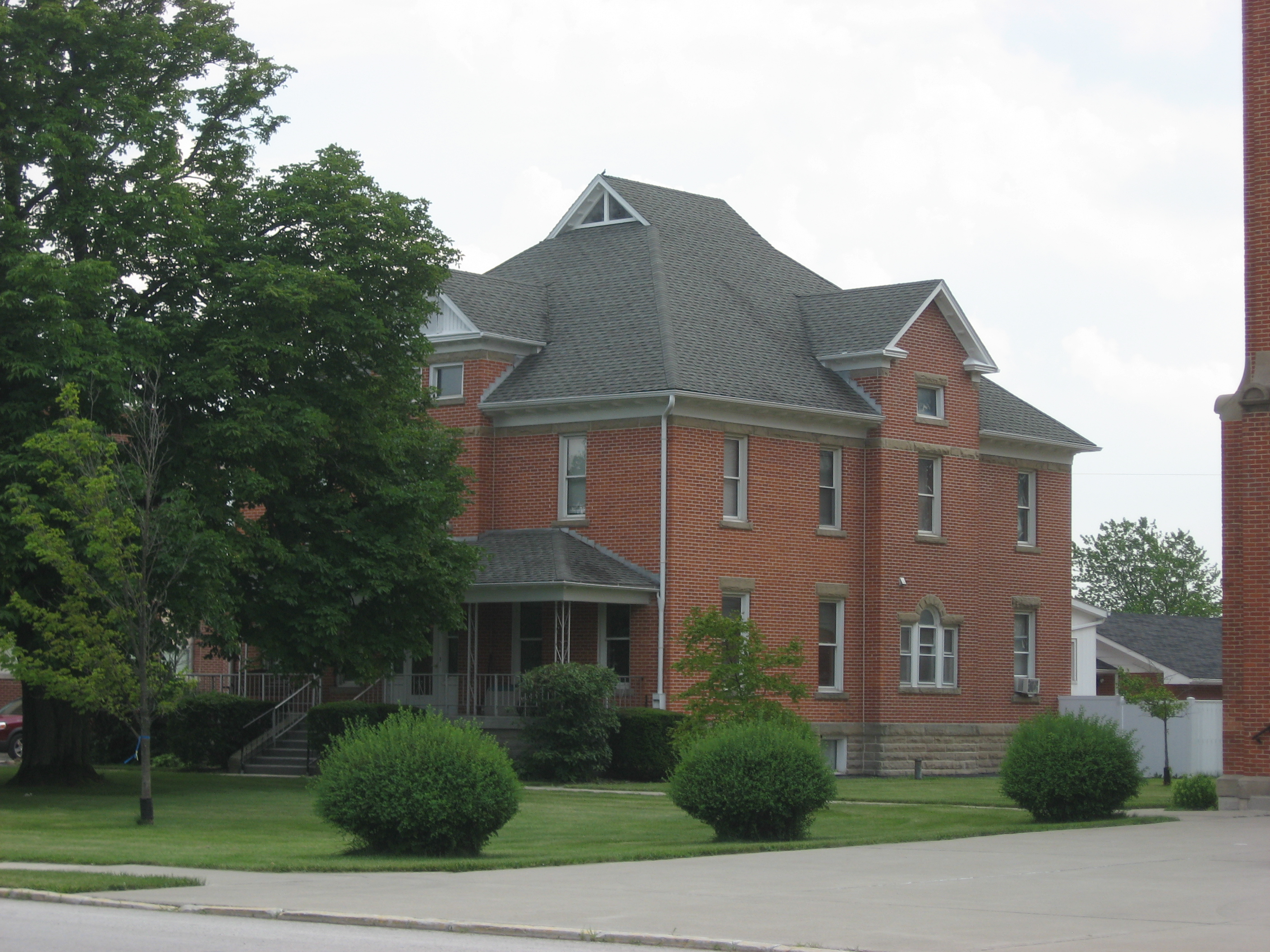
The rectory, facade and north side in 2010
