= Sisters of the Precious Blood (Switzerland) =

The Sisters of the Precious Blood (Latin: Congregatio Pretiosissimi Sanguinis) is a Catholic religious order for women founded in Grisons, Switzerland, in 1834 by Mother Maria Anna Brunner. Precious Blood Sisters form an active apostolic congregation with sisters currently serving in the United States, Chile, and Guatemala.

The congregation's mission statement reads: "Urged by the redeeming love of Jesus the Christ and rooted in Eucharistic prayer, we Sisters of the Precious Blood proclaim God's love by being a life-giving, reconciling presence in our fractured world." Members of the community are called to live out Precious Blood Spirituality regardless of their chosen ministry or daily work. Sisters have served in education, pastoral ministry, health care, social services, and various other fields.

Sisters use the post-nominal initials C.PP.S. after their names.

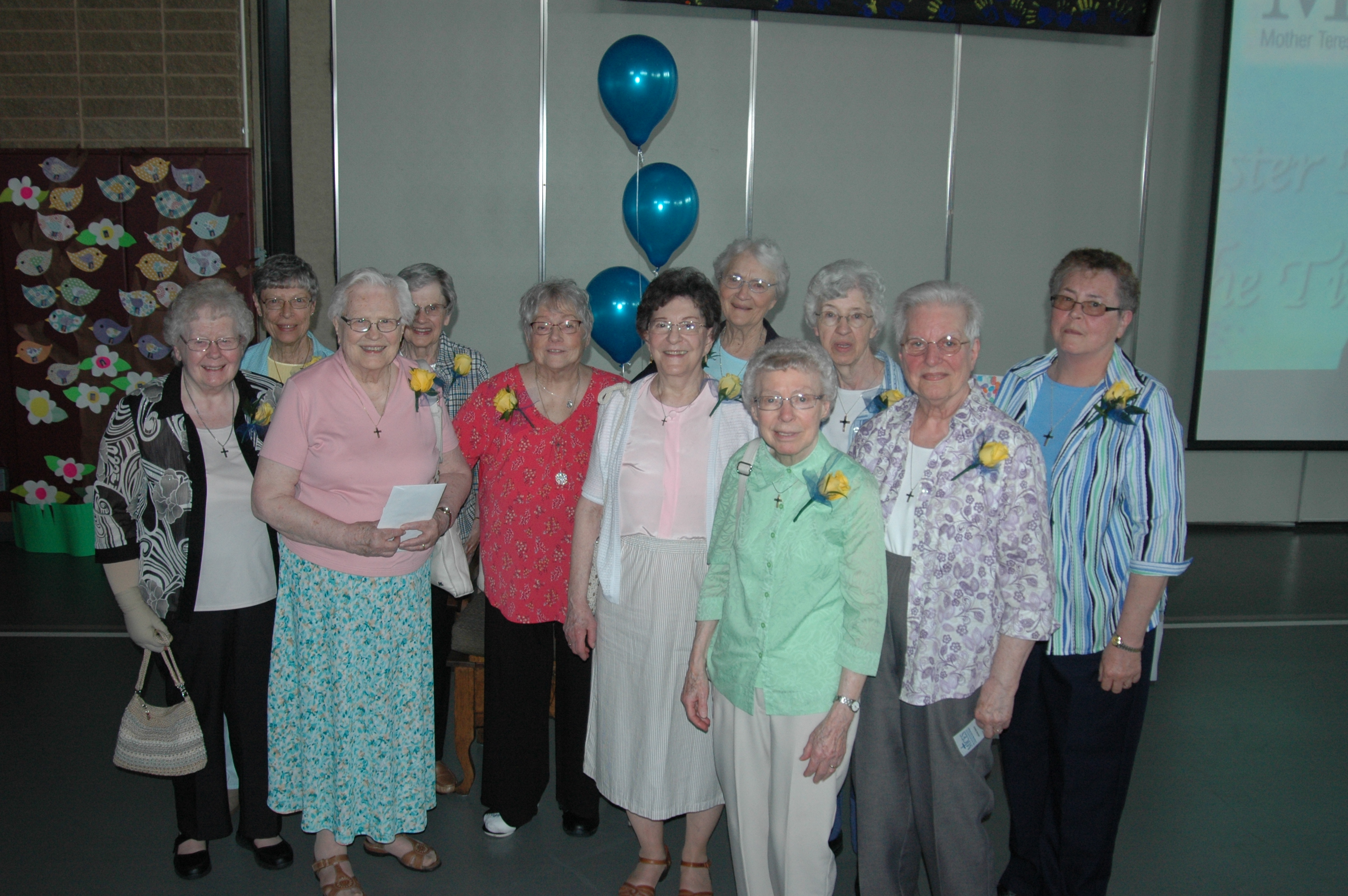
Sisters of the Precious Blood at an event in 2019.

== History ==
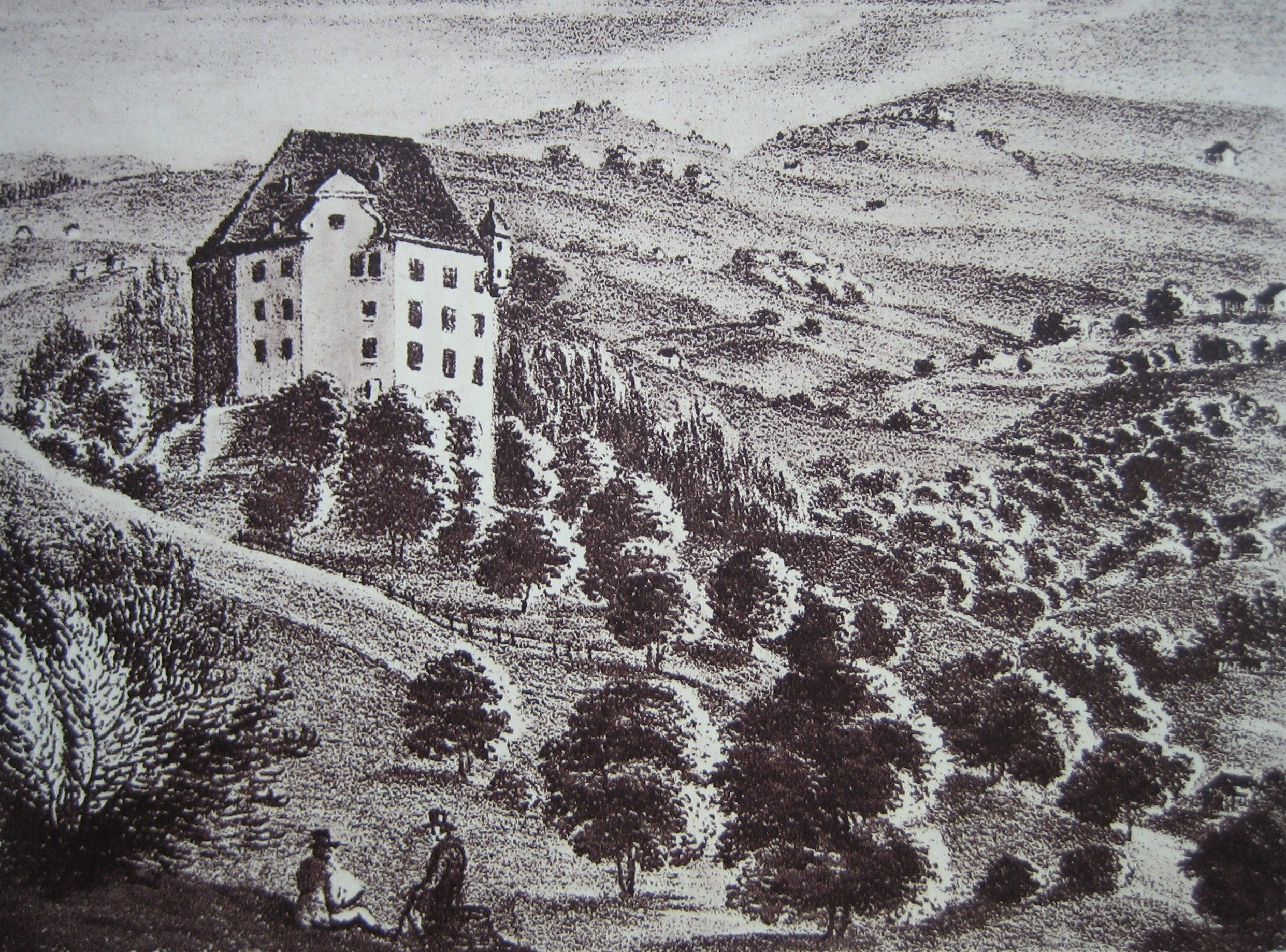
Ruins of Löwenberg by Heinrich Kraneck, 1830

Mother Maria Anna Brunner was born on 1 October 1764, in Reckenkien, near Mümliswil-Ramiswil in the canton of Solothurn, Switzerland. A widowed mother of six children, she was known for baking bread and delivering it to the needy and caring for orphans. In 1832, her son Nicholas (Rev. Francis de Sales Brunner) bought Löwenberg Castle at the canton of Schluein, which had been abandoned for 30 years, to found a school for poor boys. The following year, both Maria Anna and Father Brunner spent a nine-month pilgrimage in Rome, where they were enrolled in the Archconfraternity of the Most Precious Blood.

Upon their return to Löwenberg, two women hired at the castle were inspired to join Maria Anna for nighttime hours of adoration. Other women soon joined the original three, and in 1834 Maria Anna obtained permission from the Bishop of Chur to lead a communal life with her small group of women. The rule was founded on that of St. Benedict and approved by the bishop, the object of the community being the adoration of the Most Precious Blood and the education of youth, including the care of orphans and homeless or destitute girls. Mother Maria Anna Brunner died in 1836; Sister Clara Meisen then led them.

In 1838, Father Brunner made a second visit to Rome, where he entered the Congregation of the Most Precious Blood at Albano. After his novitiate, he returned and continued the work he had previously begun, but also started educating boys for the priesthood, to inaugurate a German province of the congregation. The sisters then became affiliated with the congregation of men.

== America ==
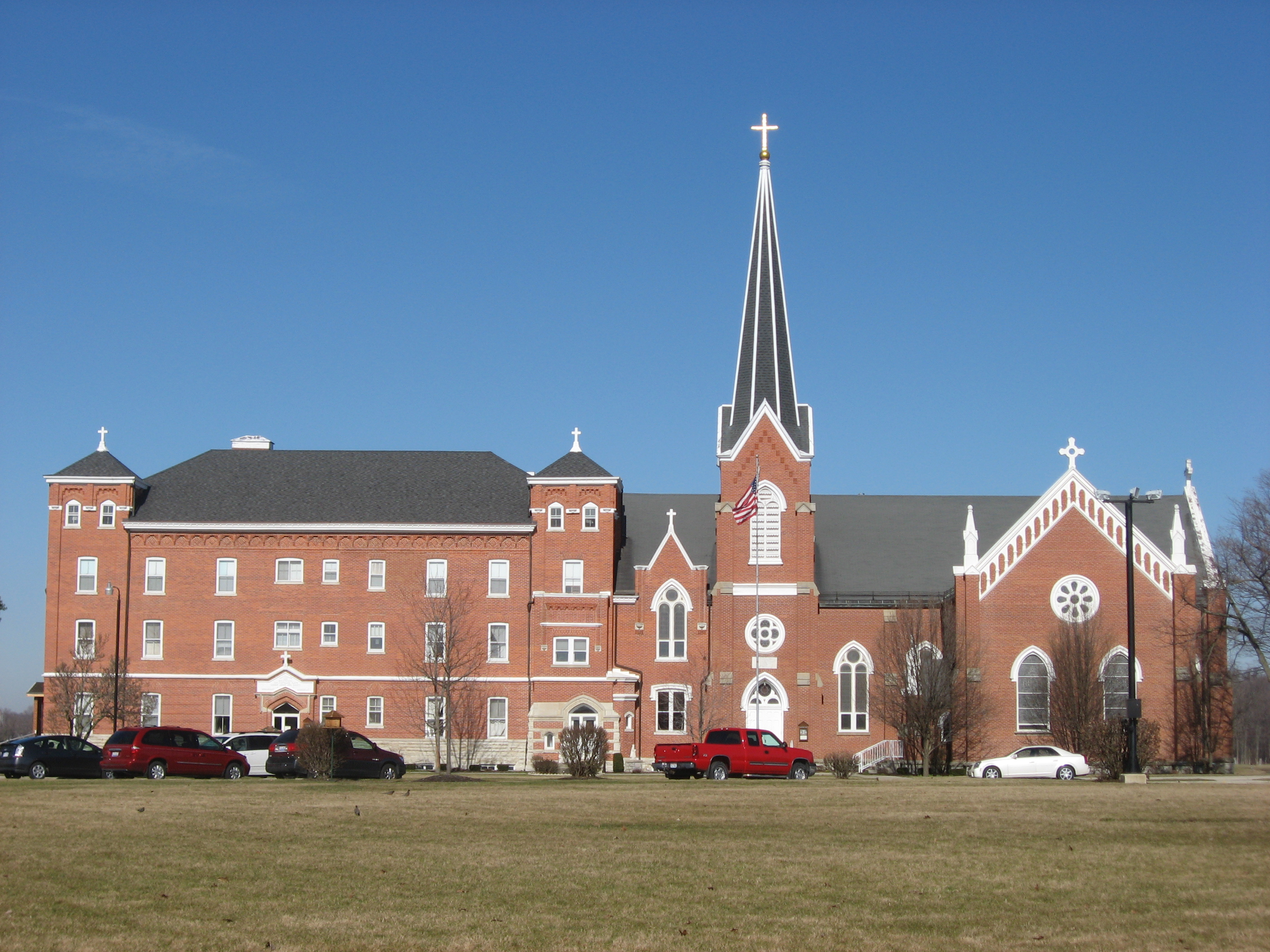
The Maria Stein Convent at Maria Stein, Ohio

In 1844, three Sisters of the Precious Blood came to the United States to minister to German immigrants in Ohio. Ten foundations of Precious Blood sisters, brothers, and priests were established in western Ohio and Jay County, Indiana. Besides providing food and clothing for themselves and other missionaries, they opened schools and orphanages and cared for the sick.

In 1846, a motherhouse was established at Maria Stein, Ohio, named after the Benedictine monastery Father Brunner had first joined. Brunner donated a painted depiction of the Miraculous Madonna of Mariastein to the convent. It is said that Brunner had it with him when crossing the English Channel in a sailing vessel and was miraculously saved from shipwreck in a bad storm. Today, the former convent at Maria Stein continues as a center of prayer and community events and houses a museum as well as the Shrine of the Holy Relics. The Maria Stein Convent complex is on the National Register of Historic Places.

In 1850, Löwenberg Castle was sold, and the rest of the sisters emigrated to Ohio. From the beginning, the sisters balanced adoration of the Precious Blood with teaching, partly in convent schools and partly in parishes founded by the Missionaries of the Precious Blood. They also were in charge of two orphanages, one in Dayton and one in Minster, Ohio. In 1886, Archbishop William Henry Elder found it advisable to revise the rule drawn up by Father Brunner to adapt it to altered conditions. This revision, besides extending the time of adoration through the day and night, increased the teaching force of the community, who were thus enabled to take charge of a more significant number of parochial schools. Also, in 1886, the sisters separated from the society of priests and made a separate congregation with a superior general under the jurisdiction of the Archbishop of Cincinnati.

In 1923, the congregation's motherhouse moved to Dayton, Ohio, where it remains.

=== New Riegel ===
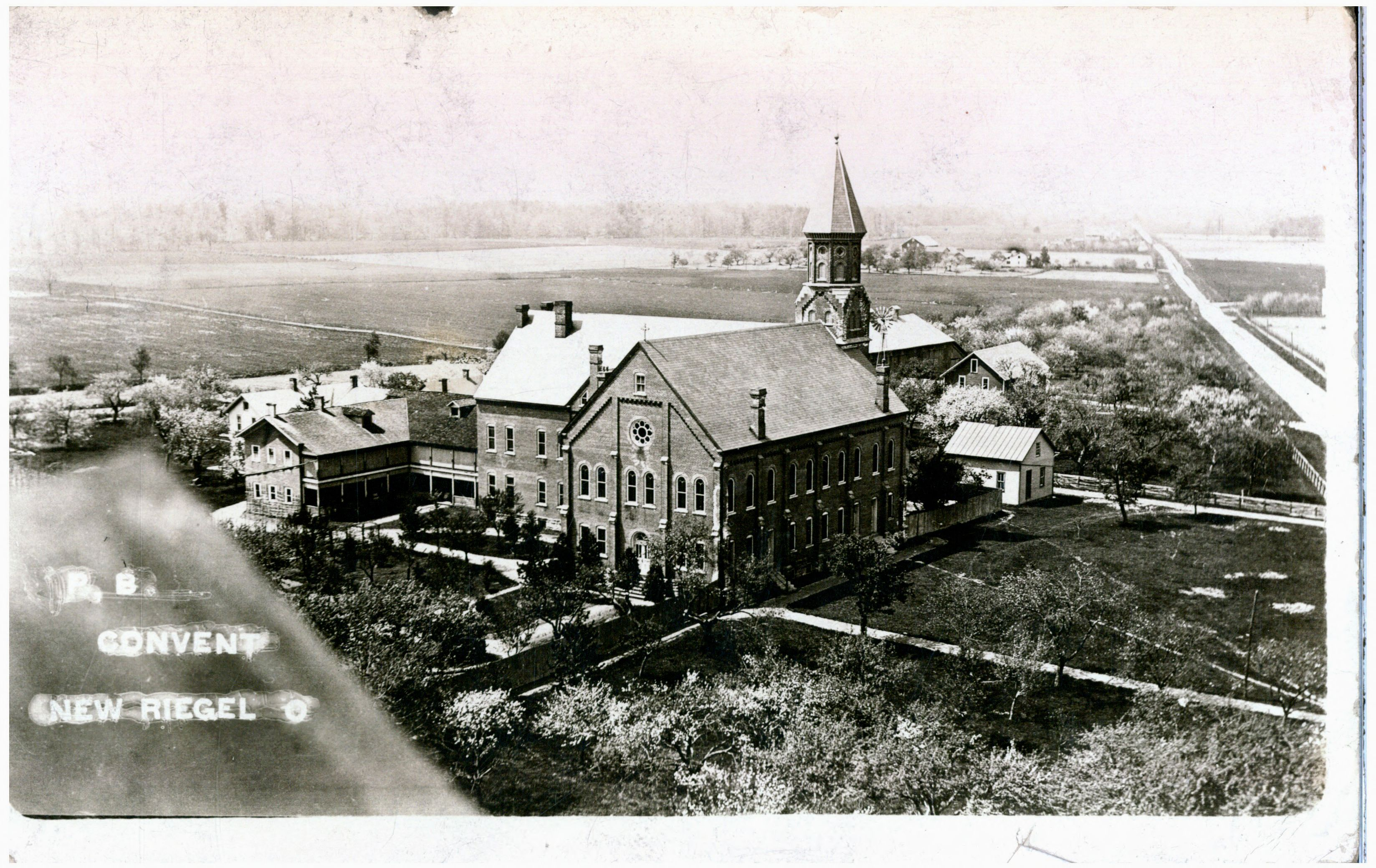
An aerial photograph of the convent in New Riegel, Ohio from 1914

New Riegel, Ohio was the first permanent settlement of the Sisters in America. In 1844, Father Brunner was given pastoral charge of the All Saints Catholic Church in New Riegel. The Sisters began ministry in New Riegel (then Wolfscreek) on December 22, 1844.

In 1954, a cloister and convent was established for The Sisters of the Precious Blood in New Riegel, Ohio. The cloister closed in 1979, when it was sold by the Sisters. The convent and nearby buildings were added to the National Register of Historic Places on November 17, 1982. In 2001, the former convent was destroyed in a fire which was likely caused by electrical problems. One person died in the fire. In 2003, the Missionaries of the Precious Blood granted the Diocese of Toledo pastoral care of the All Saints Catholic Church in New Riegel.

== Formation ==
Prospective members engage in a formation process beginning as an inquirer when a woman discerns whether she feels called to religious life. Subsequent stages include discerner, candidate, novice, and professed.

== Partner communities ==
- Adorers of the Blood of Christ
- Sisters of the Most Precious Blood, O'Fallon, Missouri
- Sisters of St. Mary of Oregon
- Missionaries of the Precious Blood

== See also ==
- Consecrated life
- Institutes of consecrated life
- Maria Stein, Ohio
- Land of the Cross-Tipped Churches
- Religious Institute (Catholic)
