= Francis de Sales Brunner =

Swiss Catholic missionary priest

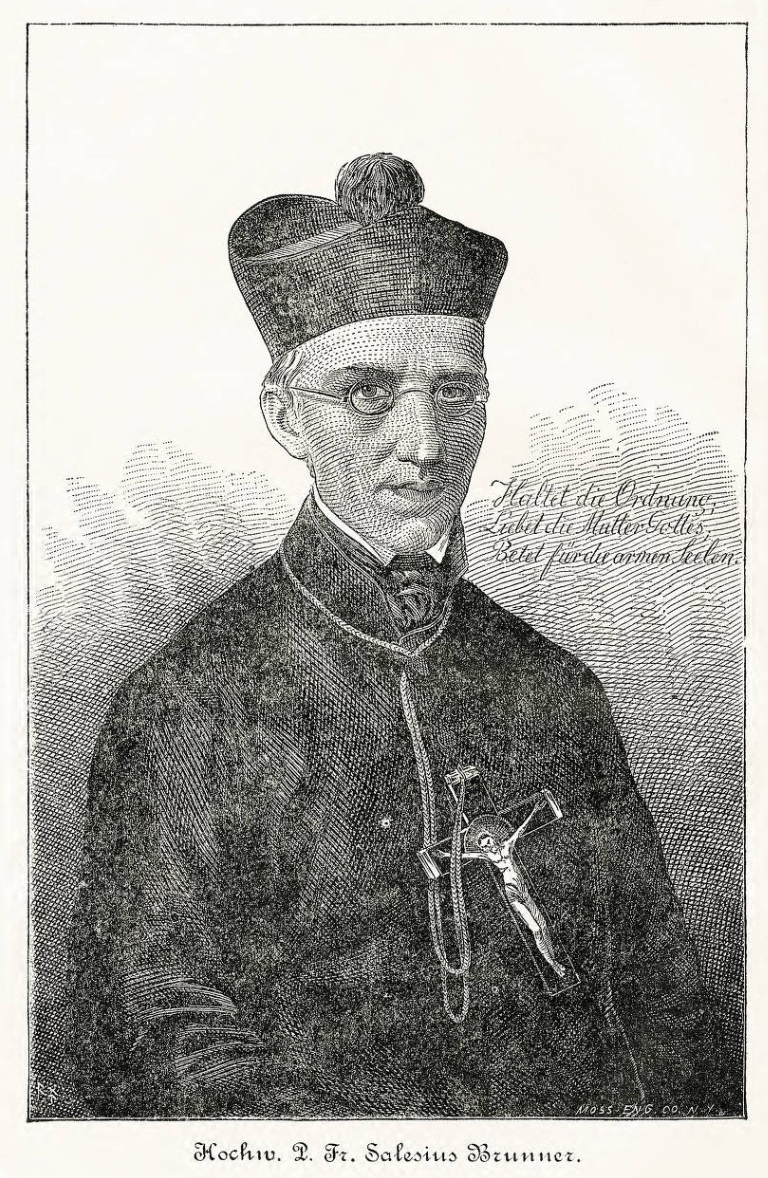
Portrait of Brunner by Swiss painter Jost Troxler (1827-1893).

Francis de Sales Brunner C.PP.S. (January 10, 1795 – December 29, 1859), in his native German Franz Sales Brunner, was a Catholic missionary priest from Switzerland. Invited to the United States by Bishop John Baptist Purcell of Cincinnati, Brunner and his fellow Missionaries of the Precious Blood labored primarily among the German-speaking Catholics of Ohio. He founded several missions there. In 1850, Brunner built the Shrine of the Sorrowful Mother in Bellevue, Ohio, the oldest Marian shrine east of the Mississippi. It continues to be staffed by the Missionaries of the Precious Blood.

== Life ==
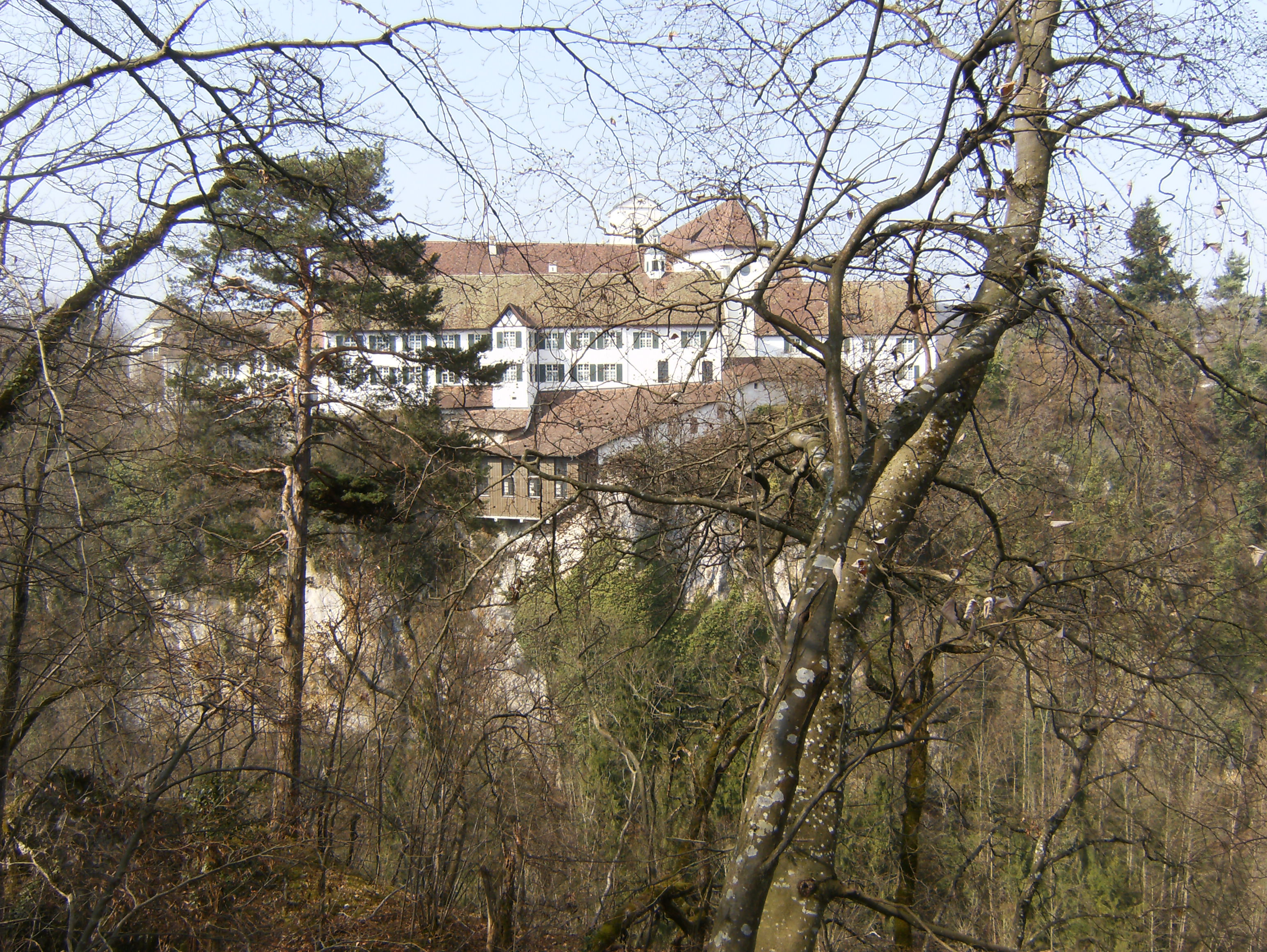
Mariastein Abbey

Nicolaus Joseph Brunner was born January 10, 1795, in Mümliswil-Ramiswil in the canton of Solothurn, Switzerland to Maria Anna and John Baptist Brunner. His father died in 1813, and shortly after Nicolaus entered the Benedictine Mariastein Abbey. Although John Gilmary Shea says Brunner was ordained February 15, 1816, by Joseph-Antoine Guisolan, Bishop of Lausanne, both Ulrich Müller, writing in the Catholic Encyclopedia, and Father Lukas Schenker OSB, historian and former abbot of Mariastein, give the date 1819.

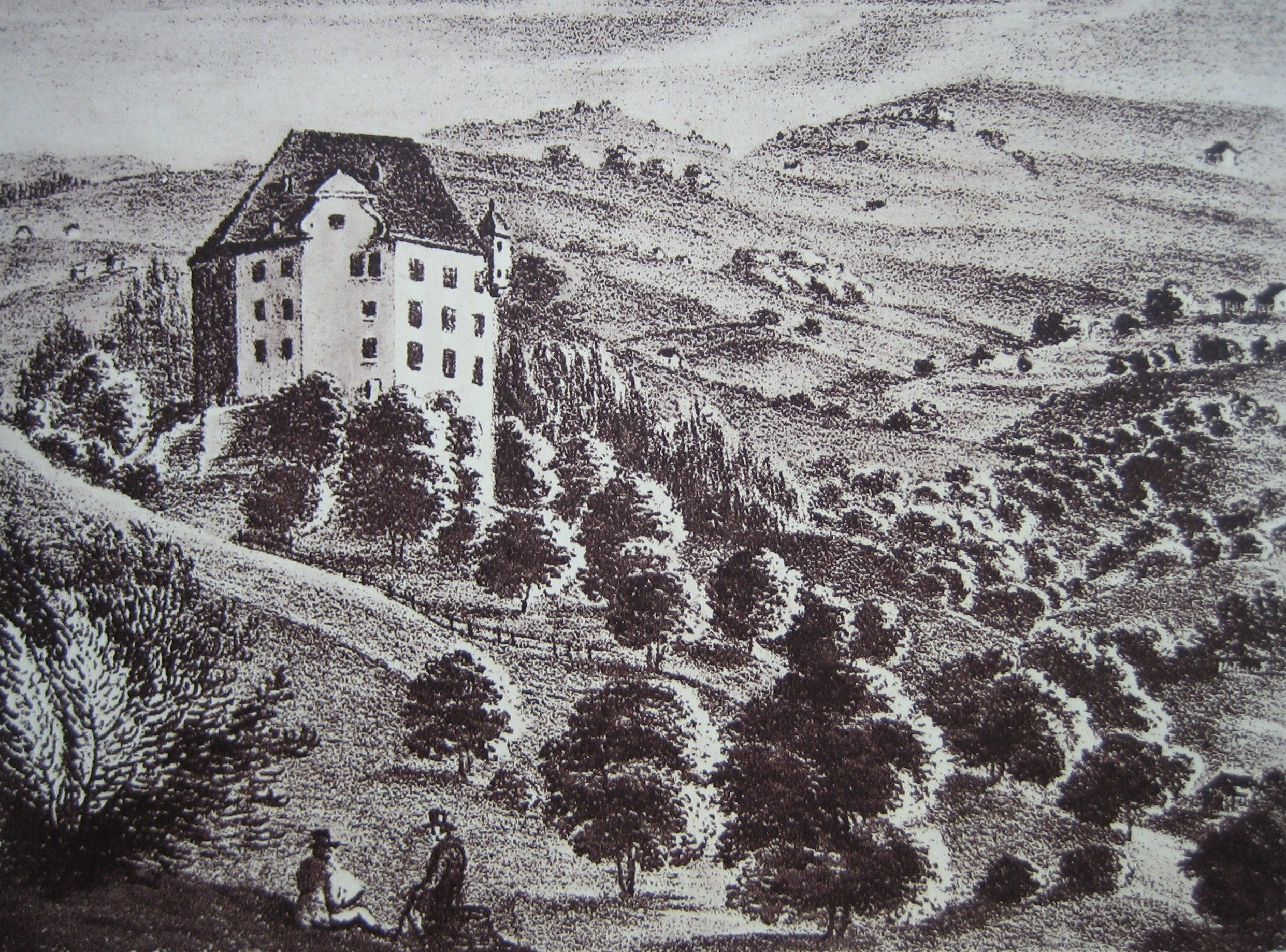
Ruins of Löwenberg by Heinrich Kraneck, 1830

In 1829, he left Mariastein for the Trappist Oelenberg Abbey in Alsace and took the Trappist vows, but had to leave it, together with the other Trappist monks, due to the French July Revolution of 1830. In the following years, he did missionary work with a focus on the canton of Graubünden. In 1832, he bought Löwenberg Castle at Schluein to found a school for poor boys.

In 1833, with his mother, he made a pilgrimage to Rome, where they were both enrolled in the Archconfraternity of the Most Precious Blood. Returned to Lowenberg, his mother gathered around her pious virgins to "hold a perpetual (day and night) adoration and dedicate their lives to the education of orphans and the furnishing of vestments for poor churches". In 1838, Brunner made a second visit to Rome, where he entered the Congregation of the Most Precious Blood at Albano. After his novitiate, he returned and continued the work he had previously begun, but also began educating boys for the priesthood, so as to inaugurate a German province of the congregation.

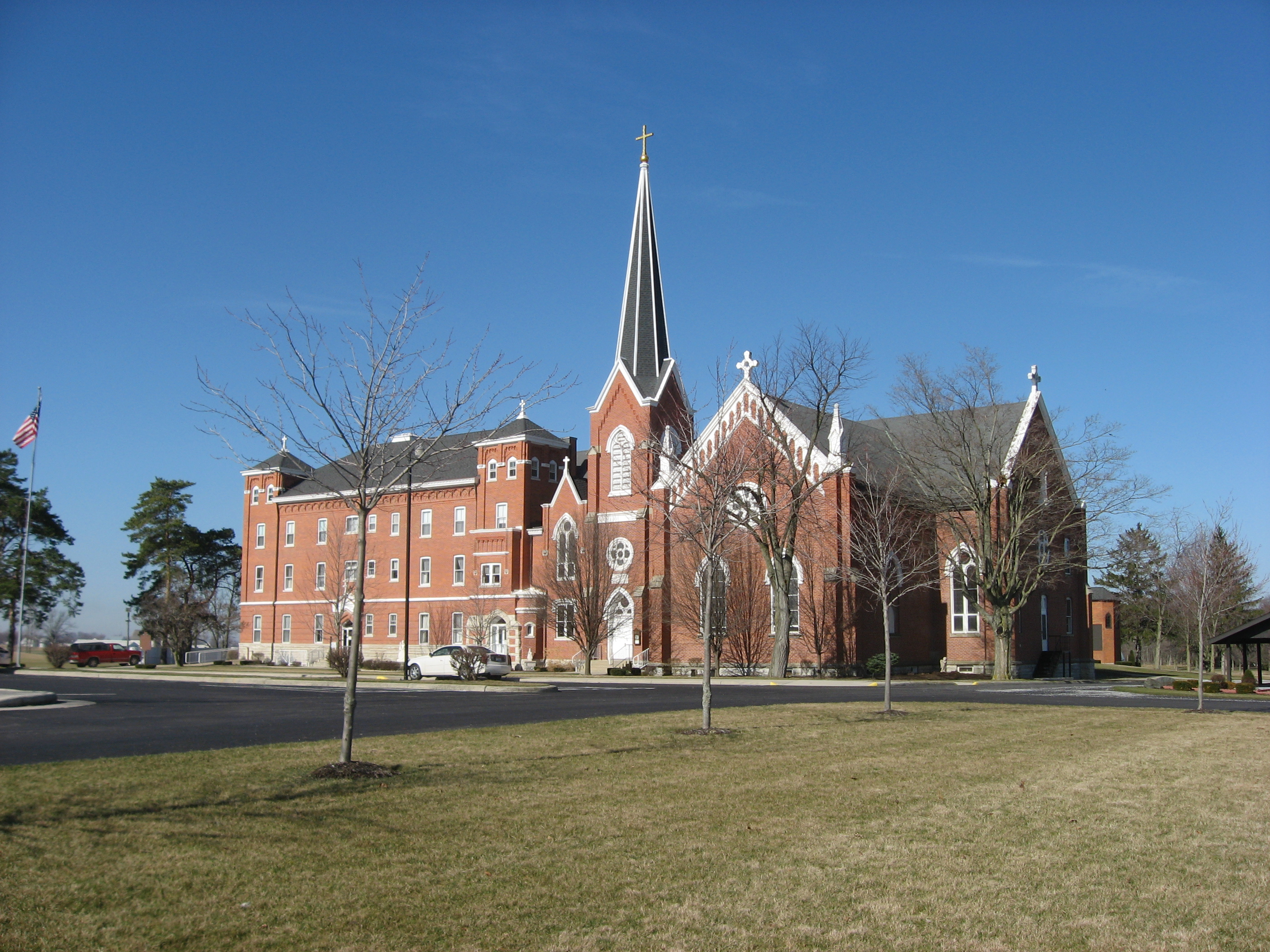
Maria Stein Convent

Bishop Purcell of Cincinnati made several trips to Europe, visiting the various seminaries there to recruit missionaries for Ohio and points further west. On one of these trips, he met Brunner at Le Havre. Later, the Government interfering more and more with his school, Brunner accepted the Bishop's invitation, brought to him by Monsignor John Henni, to establish his community in America. Brunner used the long Atlantic crossing as an opportunity to lead a nine-day retreat for the eight priests, brothers and candidates who accompanied him. They landed, December 21, 1843, at New Orleans and, ascending the Ohio River, arrived at Cincinnati on New Year's Day. From Cincinnati they proceeded to St. Alphonsus, near Norwalk, Ohio, where the first of a number of mission stations was erected; amongst them a convent at Maria Stein, Ohio, named after Mariastein Abbey. Brunner donated a painted depiction of the Miraculous Madonna of Mariastein to the convent, after which also the town was named. It is said that Brunner had the painting with him when crossing the English Channel in a sailing vessel and was miraculously saved from shipwreck in a bad storm.

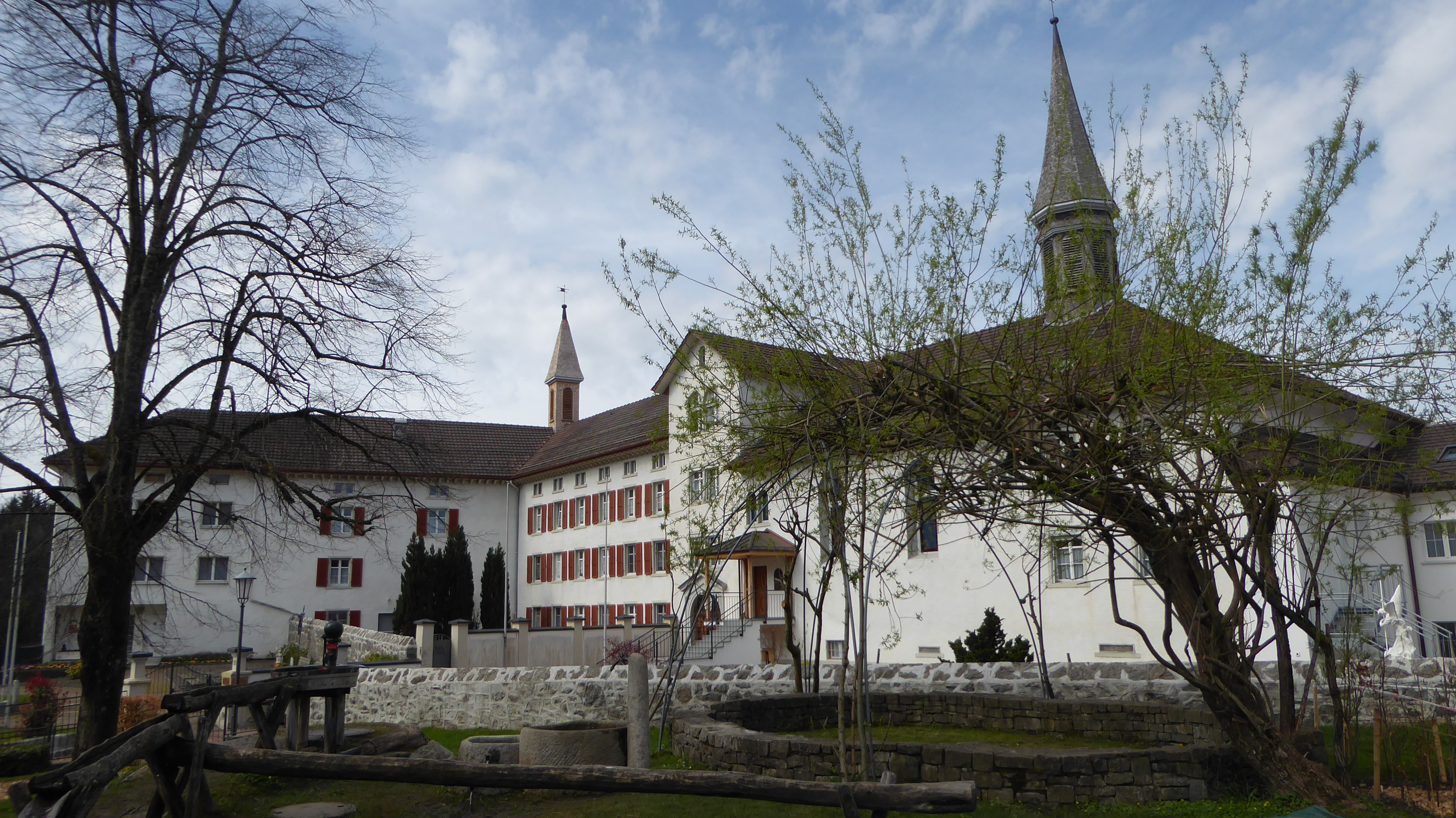
The convent of the Sisters of the Precious Blood in Schellenberg with the residence and office of the archbishop of Vaduz (left).

Brunner established a mission house at New Riegel, Ohio, in December 1844, followed by one at Thompson, and another at New Washington. In 1848 a mission was established at Glandorf, Ohio. In 1844, he became superior of the American province of the Missionaries of the Precious Blood. Their missionary circuit included all German-speaking Catholics within a radius of 100 miles; they began to erect convents and parishes and entrusted the schools to the Sisters of the Most Precious Blood, who had followed them in July, 1844.

He was an indefatigable missionary and a very prolific writer on religious subjects. Müller says that Brunner was also "the founder of the Swiss American congregation of the Benedictines". Brunner made several trips to Europe in the interest of his institution, and it was during the last of these that he died in 1859, suffering from a lung disease, at Schellenberg in the principality of Liechtenstein, where he had founded a women's convent.

== Sorrowful Mother Shrine ==
In 1850, Brunner built a small red brick chapel in honor of the Sorrowful Mother in Bellevue, Ohio, and placed within it a carved wood statue he had brought from Germany. Brunner had a great devotion to Mary, and credited her with guiding him and his priests from Germany and Switzerland safely to America. It soon became popular among the German Catholic settlers in the area. It is the oldest place of pilgrimage dedicated to Mary in the Midwest and the oldest Marian shrine east of the Mississippi. It continues to be staffed by the Missionaries of the Precious Blood.

== See also ==
- Shrine of the Holy Relics

== Bibliography ==
- Schenker, Lukas (1989), "Warum ein "Maria Stein" in Amerika?", Mariastein (in German), 35 (4): 105–108

== See also ==
- Land of the Cross-Tipped Churches
