= Henry Synck =

Photograph of Henry Synck and Wilhelmine Oppenheim at the time of their marriage.

Henry Synck Jr. was an American industrialist who participated in the development of mechanized farming.

== Early life ==
Henry Synck Jr. was born in Saint Sebastian, Ohio on July 30, 1878. He married Wilhelmina Oppenheim, the daughter of Joseph Oppenheim, a teacher in Maria Stein, Ohio.

== Farm machines ==
In the farming communities of Ohio, fertilization of fields was possible only by the distribution of animal excrement, usually mixed with bedding straw to create a semi-solid mixture of manure. The task of shoveling and distributing the manure was backbreaking and there were many attempts made to mechanize this process. One such example was a patent by a Daniel Merrell in 1886 for a mechanized "manure spreader". There were a number of other patent filings prior to the onset of the 20th century. In 1899 John M Kramer, Fred Heckman and Henry Synck, Jr., all of whom lived in the small farming community of Maria Stein, OH were awarded a patent for a device to spread manure which they named a "manure distributor". Synck subsequently worked with his future father-in-law, Joseph Oppenheim, to develop the first practical manure spreader. Oppenheim's 1900 invention was so successful that it spawned a major manufacturing company, the New Idea Spreader Works, later renamed the New Idea Farm Machinery Company in 1899. New Idea celebrated its 100th anniversary in 1999 as a division of AGCO. Synck's role in the evolution of manure spreader and other farm machinery technology is well documented by a steady stream of patents that not only describe improvements to the manure spreader, but also other farm machinery from 1899 to 1939.

In 1899 Synck's future father-in law, Joseph Oppenheim invented the most important component of the first practical mechanical manure spreader. Oppenheim conceived the idea of a practical manure spreader during a game of paddle ball. He noted that "when a player held the paddle-shaped bat at an angle, a foul ball resulted, with the ball careening off at the angle dictated by the paddle. Why not, pondered Oppenheim, make manure do the same thing—fly out at an angle from a series of paddles?" Earlier patent ideas, including that described by Kramer, Heckman and Synck (above) had a distributive mechanism that was flawed in that the width of distribution was relatively narrow. Oppenheim subsequently developed a model from a cigar box and demonstrated the feasibility of distributing manure in a "wide spread pattern". Oppenheim's patent clearly describes the distribution mechanism Manure was loaded into the spreader. A mechanism moved the manure to the rear where it was distributed by paddles.

After months of "trial and error it became obvious he (Oppenheim) had solved the problem of manure spreading...... that he had created a "New Idea"......and that a name and an invention had been born!" Oppenheim died in 1901 and was buried in Maria Stein. Following his death, his wife, Mary Ellerbrock Oppenheim, invested in New Idea and made decisions to move the company forward. The "New Idea Spreader Works" was established and built in Maria Stein. The "New Idea" caught on quickly because it relieved farmers of the back-breaking chore of manually distributing manure from a wagon. Mary Oppenheim died in 1907 New Idea continued to grow and in 1908 the company moved to Coldwater, Ohio, where a railhead existed to ship the completed spreaders. The privately held company was led by BC Oppenheim, Joseph Oppenheim's son. In this closely held family company, Henry Synck remained involved with New Idea as a manager of one of the production units.

By 1918, these children of Joseph and Mary Oppenheim were on record as the persons engaged in the business of the New Idea Spreader Co.: B. C. Oppenheim, J. A. Oppenheim, Theodore Oppenheim (responsible for the development of the two-row corn picker today on display in the Henry Ford Museum), Justin Oppenheim, Wilhelmina Synck (Henry's wife), and Cecilia Selhorst.

Following BC Oppenheim's death, Henry Synck served as President of New Idea. In 1945 the family sold New Idea to Avco, a conglomerate that was subsequently acquired by Textron. In a complicated series of transactions, Textron subsequently divested New Idea to Allied Corporation, another conglomerate (White-New Idea) who subsequently divested it to AGCO Corporation. New Idea has continued to produce a broad spectrum of farm-related machinery. Unfortunately, the Coldwater, Ohio plant was closed in 1999 as the manufacturer sought to reduce costs and consolidate manufacturing in fewer locations.
