= Manure spreader =

Agricultural machine

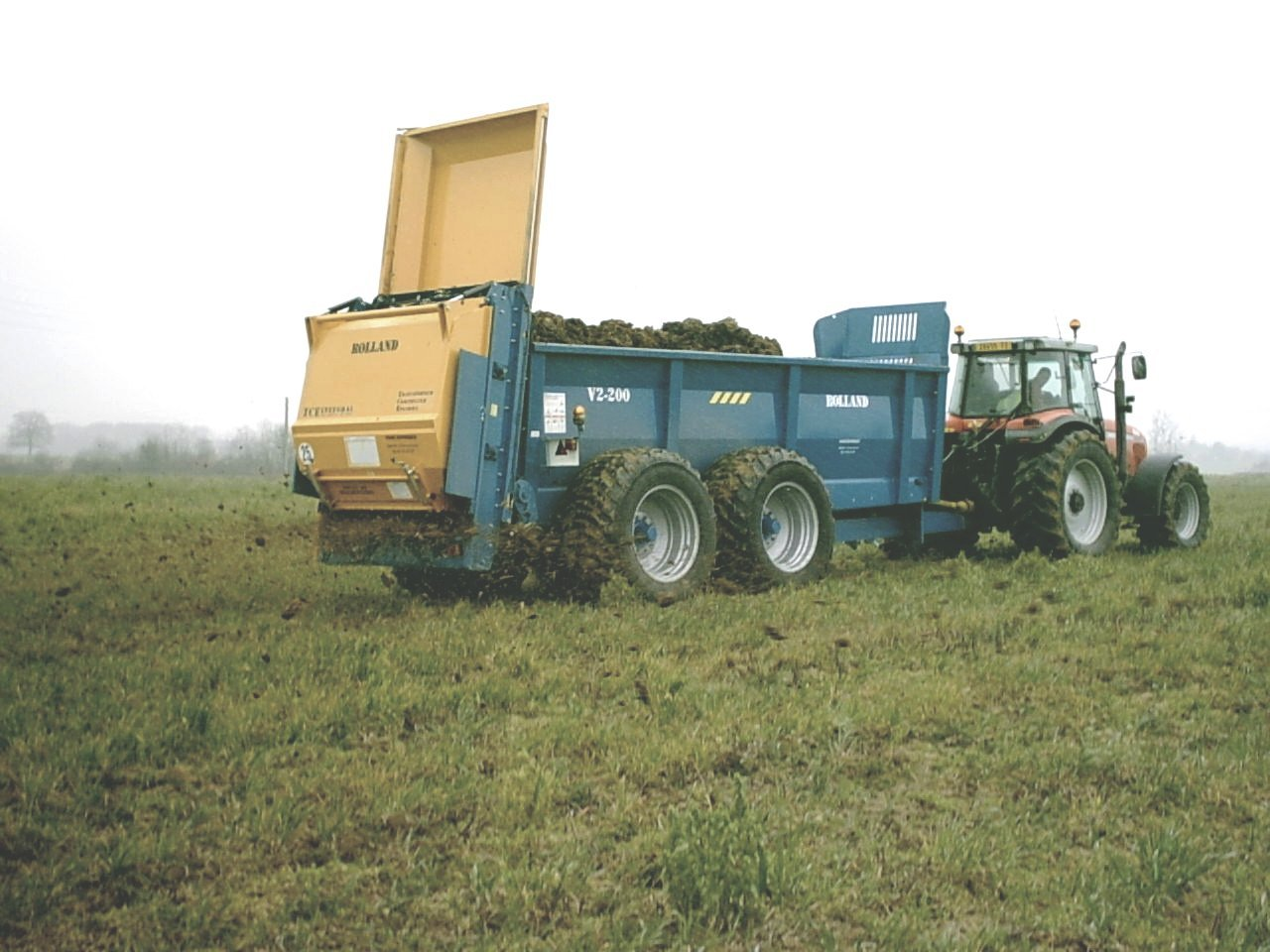
A modern manure spreader

A manure spreader, muck spreader, or honey wagon is an agricultural machine used to distribute manure over a field as a fertilizer. A typical (modern) manure spreader consists of a trailer towed behind a tractor with a rotating mechanism driven by the tractor's power take off (PTO). Truck mounted manure spreaders are also common in North America.

== Operation ==
Manure spreaders began as ground-driven units which could be pulled by a horse or a team of horses. Many of these ground-driven spreaders are still produced today, mostly in the form of small units that can be pulled behind a larger garden tractor or an all terrain vehicle (ATV). In recent years hydraulic and PTO driven units have been developed to offer variable application rates. Several models are also designed with removable rotating mechanisms (beaters), attachable side extensions, and tailgates for hauling chopped forages, cereal grains, and other crops. A typical (modern) manure spreader consists of a trailer towed behind a tractor with a rotating mechanism driven by the tractor's power take off (PTO).

== History ==
An advertisement for a J.S. Kemp model spreader

The first successful automated manure spreader was designed by Joseph Kemp in 1875. Manure spreaders began as ground-driven units which could be pulled by a horse or team of horses. At the time of his invention, he was living near Magog, Quebec in Canada, but thereafter, he moved to Newark Valley, New York and formed the J.S. Kemp Manufacturing Co. to manufacture and market his current and subsequent designs. In 1903, he expanded the company to Waterloo, Iowa before selling the design to International Harvester, in 1906.

Joseph Oppenheim of Maria Stein, Ohio was the inventor of the first modern 'wide spreading' manure spreader and is honored as such in the Ohio Agricultural Hall of Fame. Originally manure was thrown from a wagon. Later, “manure unloaders” used a drag chain at the bottom of the wagon to pull the load of manure to the rear where it was shredded by a pair of beaters. Because the unloaders deposited manure directly behind the wagon but with very little spreading to the sides, farmers still had to take the time-consuming step of heading into the fields with peg-tooth drags or similar implements to spread the manure in order to prevent burning the soil.

Oppenheim, a schoolmaster in the small town, concerned that his older male students often missed school loading and spreading manure, patented a wagon that, behind the drag chain and two beaters, incorporated a steel axle with several wooden paddles attached to the shaft at an angle to throw the manure outward in a broad pattern eliminating the necessity for manual spreading. On October 18, 1899, Oppenheim began to produce his new manure spreader, incorporating the “widespread” paddle device. Neighbors soon referred to it as “Oppenheim’s new idea” and Oppenheim adopted this name for his business.

Although Oppenheim died in November, 1901, the demand for the New Idea Spreader Company's labor-saving “widespread” machines quickly grew and fifteen years later, under the direction of his oldest son, B.C. Oppenheim, and Henry Synck, one of Oppenheim's first employees, the company, had branches in eight states and an assembly plant in Guelph, Ontario. It had total sales in 1916 of $1,250,000. Eight years later, in 1924, the factory was turning out 125 manure spreaders in an eight-hour day. and “became the brand that set the standards for spreader performance, durability and reliability decade after decade.”

During the 1920s, Henry Synck, who became president of the company in 1936 when Joseph's son, B.C. Oppenheim, died, patented several improvements to the spreader. In 1945 the Oppenheim family sold its controlling interest in the closely held New Idea Company to AVCO Manufacturing. AVCO later sold the company to White Farm Equipment Company which in 1993 sold it to AGCO (Allis-Gleaner Corporation), the current owner.

It is clear, however, that there were other competitors in this field, each of whom spread the manure by a slightly different technique. One of these is the Great Western Farm Equipment Line, produced in Chicago, IL.

== See also ==
- Broadcast spreader
- Honeywagon
- Liquid manure
- List of agricultural machinery
- Reuse of excreta

== Bibliography ==
- U.S. Patent Office, Patent No. 648,519, Manure Distributor and Spreader for Joseph Oppenheim, Maria Stein, Ohio, Filed February 17, 1900.
- Patents for Henry Synck issued 1920-1937 (accessed February 8, 2011)
- “Henry Synck,” Nevin O. Winter, Litt.D., History of Northwest Ohio, vol. 2, p. 874, The Lewis Publishing Company, Chicago & New York, 1917.
- Tharran E. Gaines, “100 Years of New Ideas,” FieldHAND, Spring 1999, p. 8.
- Brian Wayne Wells, “The New Idea Spreader Company of Coldwater, Ohio (Part 1 of 2 Parts),” Belt/Pulley Magazine, Vol. 11, No. 5, September/October 1998, (accessed Nov. 8, 2010)
- Brian Wayne Wells, “The New Idea Spreader Company (Part 2 of 2 Parts)” Belt/Pulley Magazine, Vol. 11, No. 6, November/December 1998, (accessed Nov. 8, 2010)
- “Manure Spreader Product Review,” American Cattlemen, June 2010, Spencer, Iowa (reviewing six spreaders), (accessed February 8, 2011)
- Cindy Birt, “New Idea: Its Start and the First 75 Years,” The Celina, Ohio Daily Standard, May 16, 1974, p. 18.
- “Memories of New Idea,” Mercer County Chronicle, August 4, 1988, Sophia Synck Bomholt.
- “New Idea Celebrates 100th Anniversary,” Mercer County Chronicle, September 2–8, 1999, p. 9.
- AVCO Dealer News Vol. 15, No. 10, October 1969, p. 5.
- Ohio Agricultural Council, 4th Annual, August 27, 1969. Program p. 7.
- “100th Anniversary, A Century of Excellence, New Idea 1899-1999” Pamphlet, AGCO Corporation, pp. 1, 3 and 4.
