= Frenchtown, Seneca County, Ohio =

Unincorporated community in Ohio, U.S.

Coordinates: 41°01′44″N 83°20′37″W

Frenchtown is an unincorporated community in Seneca County, in the U.S. state of Ohio.

== History ==
The first settlement at the site that would become known as "Frenchtown" in the 20th century was created in the 1840s and 1850s by French-speaking immigrants largely from Belgium and Luxembourg. The Catholic immigrants of the area built a log chapel dedicated to St. Nicholas, which was later replaced by a two-story school house (built in 1872) after a brick church was built across the road in 1856–1857. A two-story, red-brick rectory was built adjacent to the church in 1864, and the parish acquired a two-story home across the street from the church in 1930, for use as a convent for the Sisters who taught in the parish school. Shoddy construction necessitated the replacement of the former church, leading the community to build a large, red-brick Romanesque revival church. Bishop Richard Gilmour of the Roman Catholic Diocese of Cleveland blessed the cornerstone on October 9, 1887, and his vicar general, Msgr. Felix Boff, dedicated the new church on November 9, 1890. During the 19th century, the church was known as "St. Nicholas, Berwick," since the neighboring community of Berwick, two miles east) possessed the nearest railroad station; at that time, the church was served by the New Riegel post office (two miles northeast of the settlement). After the church was placed within the boundaries of the new post office in Adrian (three miles southeast), it became known as "St. Nicholas, Adrian." Sacramental records suggest that the first written reference to "St. Nicholas, Frenchtown" was made in the late 1910s.

== Landmarks ==
- St. Nicholas Catholic Church, dedicated in 1890
- St. Nicholas Catholic Cemetery, with over 1,000 marked graves
- The former rectory, a two-story, brick home to the west of the church (now a private residence)
- The former convent, across the street from the rectory (now a private residence)
