= Joseph Oppenheim =

German and American inventor (1859–1901)

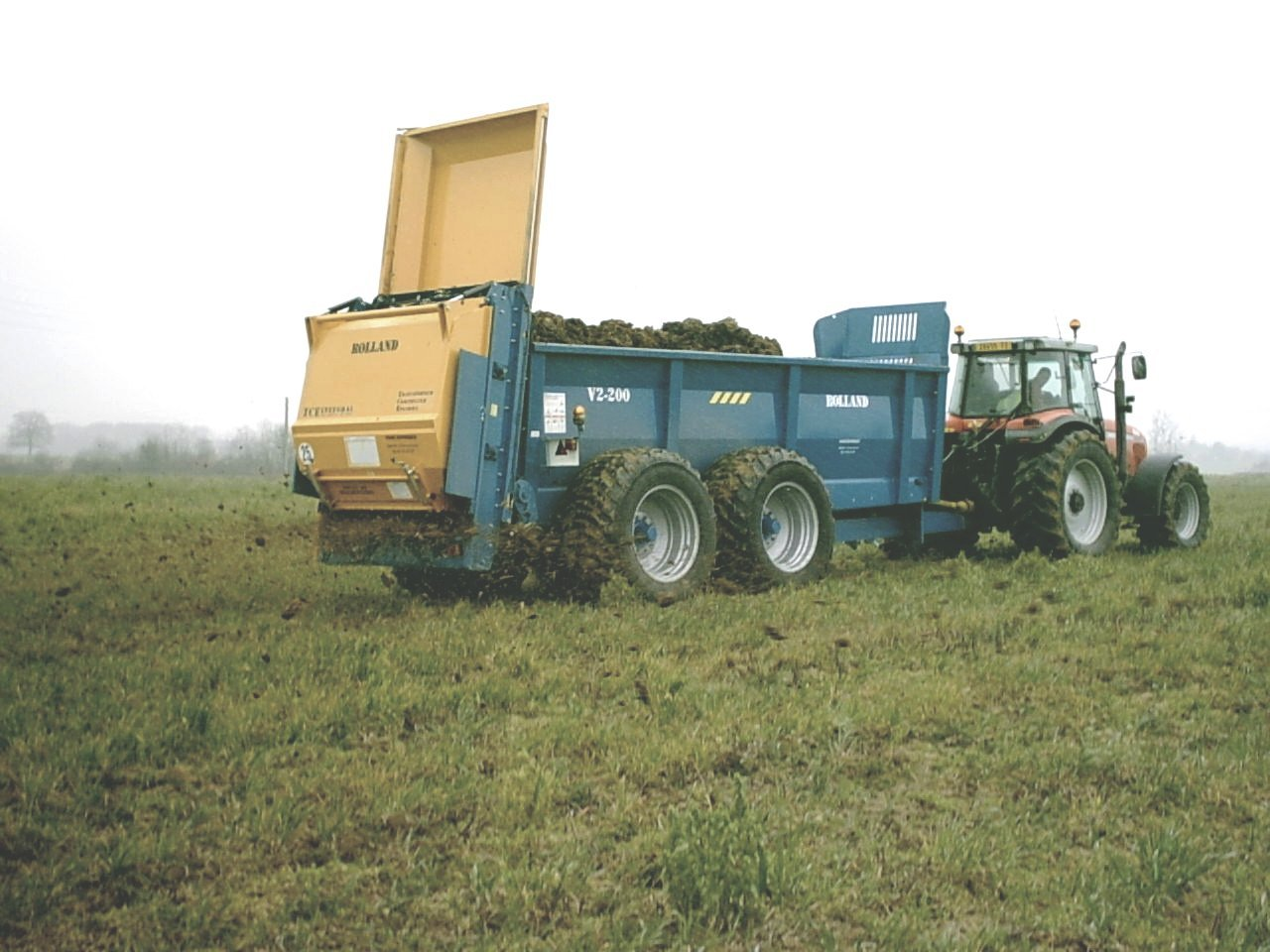
A manure spreader

Joseph Oppenheim (March 1, 1859 – November 24, 1901) was an American educator who invented the modern widespread manure spreader that made farming less labor-intensive and far more efficient in the early 20th century.

== Early life and teaching career ==
Born on March 1, 1859, in the small village of Kirchhundem, Kingdom of Prussia. Oppenheim obtained a liberal education at universities in Bonn, Germany, and Innsbruck, Austria, and upon graduation from college at the age of 20 he immigrated to the United States. He received a teaching degree in 1881 from St. Francis College in Wisconsin and after briefly teaching in Putnam County, Ohio, he returned to St. Francis College for further study. On August 9, 1883, he married Anna Mary Ellerbrock of Glandorf, Ohio. He then taught in Freyburg, Ohio, New Albany, Indiana, and Grand Rapids, Michigan, before settling in the small town of Maria Stein, Ohio. Oppenheim was "an accomplished musician, specializing in piano and pipe organ, ... a remarkable scholar, conversant with four languages, well read in literature, and an excellent speaker." As an educator, Oppenheim became the first teacher in Ohio to receive a Lifetime State Teachers Certificate.

== Educator turns inventor ==
In the 1890s, Oppenheim was a schoolmaster in the one-room country schoolhouse in Maria Stein, the town where John M. Kramer was building a "manure unloader" based on a patent in his name but claimed to be jointly owned by him, Fred Heckman and Henry Synck. Originally manure was thrown from a wagon. The unloader that Kramer built used a drag chain at the bottom of the wagon to pull the load of manure to the rear where it was shredded by a pair of beaters and deposited directly behind the machine, but with very little spreading to the sides. As a result, farmers still had to take the time-consuming step of heading into the fields with peg-tooth drags or similar implements to spread the manure in order to prevent burning the soil.

As a schoolmaster, Oppenheim was concerned that the older boys often missed class at certain times of the year to stay home and work on the farm, usually loading and spreading manure. Not only was the chore backbreaking, but it deprived them of their education which Oppenheim saw as a need for the future.

While watching children play a game called "tom ball," Oppenheim noticed that when the ball was struck with the bat, which was actually a paddle-shaped board, the ball was deflected to one side or the other, depending on the angle of the paddle. Oppenheim saw this paddle-effect as the solution to the problem of manure spreading. He felt that a series of paddles could be attached to the rear of a manure unloader to cast manure in a wide pattern several times the width of the wagon.

To test his theory, Joseph, with the help of his oldest son, B.C. Oppenheim, knocked the end out of a cigar box and built a small rotary paddle distributor into that open end. Each of the paddles on the rotary distributor was set at a different angle. Then, Joseph and his son filled the cigar box with chaff and operated the small distributor with power from the drive wheel of a sewing machine. The test was successful. The chaff was thrown in a wide pattern. After several other tests, Oppenheim became convinced that he had an idea that could be designed into manure unloaders. When Kramer's machine shop was destroyed by fire and his business failed, Oppenheim obtained Kramer's patent in exchange for forgiving a loan he had made to Kramer and then obtained a patent for his own new idea. Thus the widespread modern manure spreader was born.

== Oppenheim's New Idea manure spreader ==
Oppenheim's first New Idea spreader had two beaters. The top beater was situated immediately above the lower beater and was smaller because pulverizing of the top part of the load was easier than the bottom. Immediately behind the beaters was the famous New Idea "widespread" which had a steel axle with several wooden paddles attached to it. The paddles were six inches wide and eight inches long, fastened to the shaft at an angle to throw the manure outward."

On October 18, 1899, Oppenheim broke ground for a small shop in Maria Stein, Ohio, where he could produce his new manure spreader, incorporating the "widespread" paddle device in addition to two beaters. Among the first employees he hired at the shop were Fred Heckman and Henry Synck. Synck, who later married one of Joseph's daughters, Wilhelmina, was said by contemporaries to have had "a genius for machinery and mechanics of all kinds." and "in 1899 he entered the employ of Oppenheim and gradually familiarized himself with the technique of the business.". Neighbors around the town of Maria Stein started referring to the widespread manure spreaders as "Oppenheim's new idea" and Joseph adopted this as the name for the business.

Only two manure spreaders were produced the first year of operation and fourteen the following year. Oppenheim did not live long enough to realize any financial reward, for he died on November 24, 1901, as one of the victims of typhoid fever that struck the small village. But his wife, Anna Mary, carried on operations of the New Idea Spreader Works by using the money obtained from Joseph's insurance policy. Joseph's son, B.C. Oppenheim, became the president in place of his father and Henry Synck was in charge of production. Not only did the business carry on, it thrived on brisk sales of the New Idea spreader.

In 1902 a new model spreader was introduced not only with a greatly reduced draft to lighten the burden on horses, but also with the upper beater moved slightly forward adding to the efficiency of both beaters.

== Rapid growth of the New Idea Company ==
In 1904 the company changed its name to the New Idea Spreader Company and demand for its manure spreaders increased steadily until it soon outgrew its first little shop. On July 1, 1907, the New Idea Spreader Company, while maintaining operations at Maria Stein, opened a factory in nearby Coldwater, Ohio where it had the advantage of two railroads on which it could ship the spreaders. In 1912, all operations were moved to a new 220,000-square-foot (20,000 m^{2}) factory on twenty acres in Coldwater with all machinery driven by electricity. By 1916 the New Idea Spreader Company had branches in eight states and an assembly plant in Guelph, Ontario. "[The] net assets of the firm were over one million dollars with total sales for that year of $1,250,000." Eight years later, in 1924, the factory was turning out 125 manure spreaders in an eight-hour day and had a profit of two million dollars.

"To meet the changing business environment, the company was incorporated in 1920 as the New Idea Company; however the stock was not publicly traded and it remained a closely-held family corporation" until 1937 when it began to take on outside investors.

When B.C. Oppenheim died in 1935, Joseph's son-in-law, Henry Synck, who was one of Oppenheim's first employees, became president. Ten years later, in October 1945, Joseph Oppenheim's heirs, all of whom worked from the beginning in sales and production, sold their controlling interest in New Idea to AVCO. In 1984 AVCO sold the New Idea line of farm machinery to White Farm Equipment Company, part of the Allied Corporation, which formed White-New Idea which sold the company to AGCO in 1993. On December 8, 1999, nearly 100 years after Joseph Oppenheim patented his invention, AGCO announced that it would close the New Idea manufacturing facilities in Coldwater, Ohio because "reduced demand for agricultural equipment" precluded it from remaining competitive.

Joseph Oppenheim was inducted into the Ohio Agricultural Hall of Fame in Columbus, Ohio by Governor James A. Rhodes on August 27, 1969. His portrait hangs in the Ohio Historical Building on the State Fairgrounds.

== Sources ==
- Joseph Oppenheim, Educator and Inventor (March 1, 1859 – November 24, 1901)
