= Shrine of the Holy Relics =

Collection of relics in the United States

- Maria Stein Convent
- U.S. National Register of Historic Places
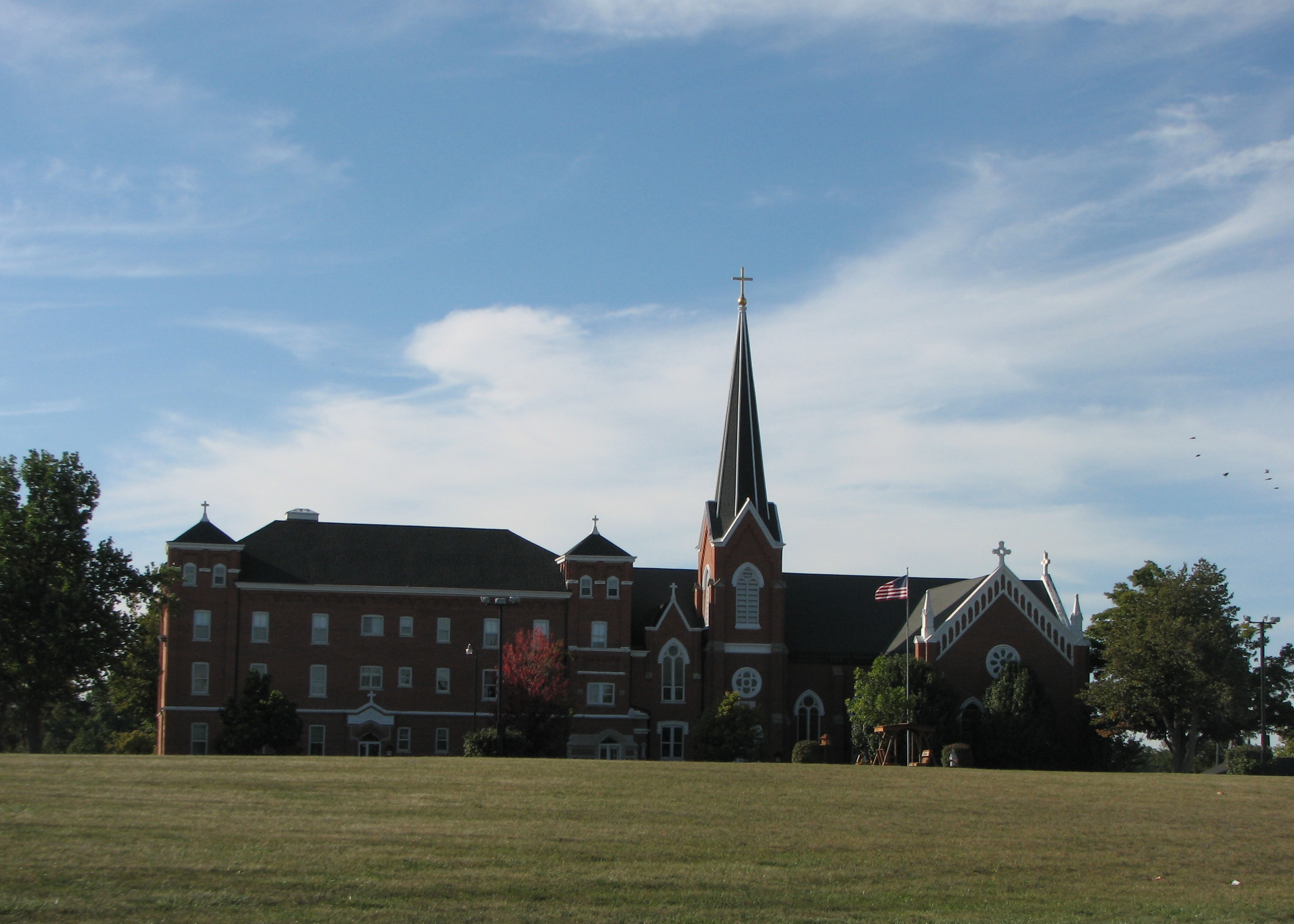
- Road view of the convent complex; the shrine is at far right

- Location within Ohio Location within the United States
- Nearest city: Maria Stein, Ohio
- Coordinates: 40°24′57″N 84°28′34″W
- Area: 23 acres (9.3 ha)
- Built: 1846
- Architectural style: Gothic Revival
- MPS: Cross-Tipped Churches of Ohio TR (later addition)
- NRHP reference No.: 76001490
- Added to NRHP: May 6, 1976

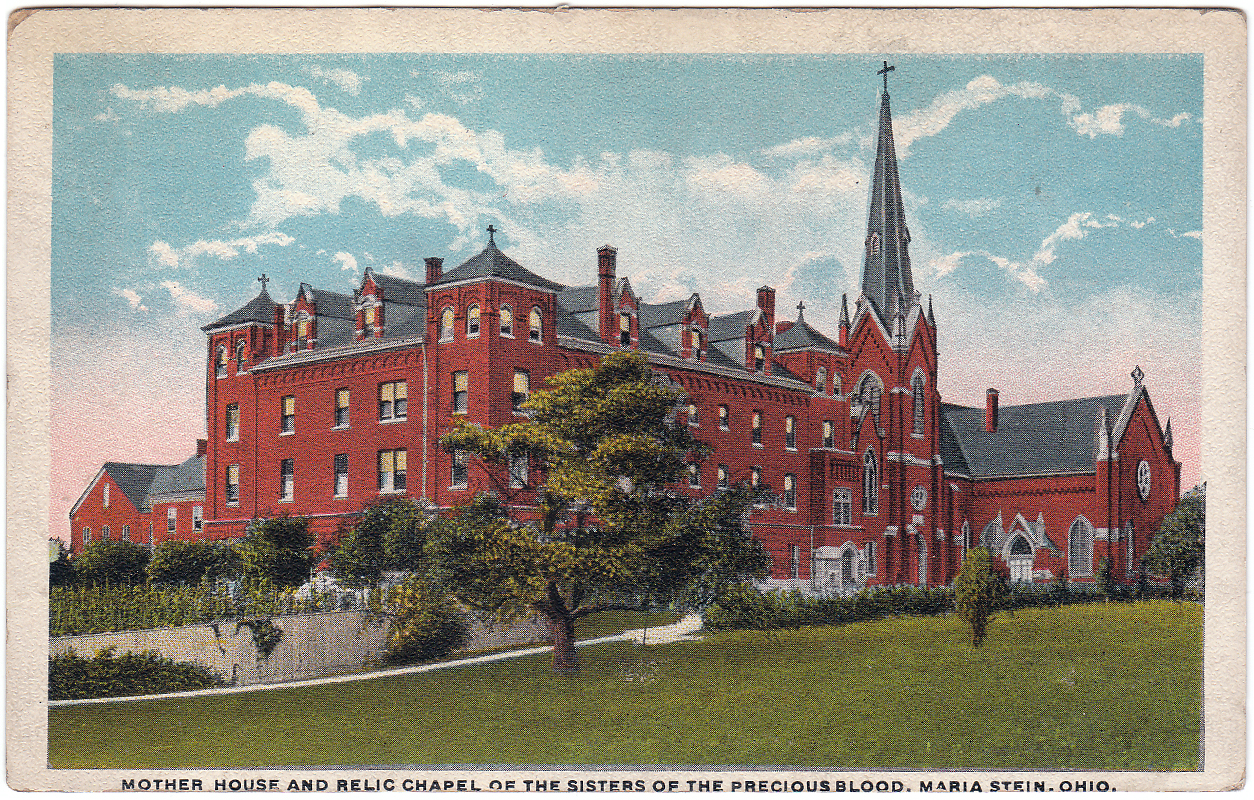
Mother House and Relic Chapel of the Sisters of the Precious Blood, Maria Stein, Ohio (1923 Postcard)

The Shrine of the Holy Relics in Maria Stein, Ohio is the second largest collection of relics in the United States. It is a part of the historic Maria Stein Convent.

== History ==
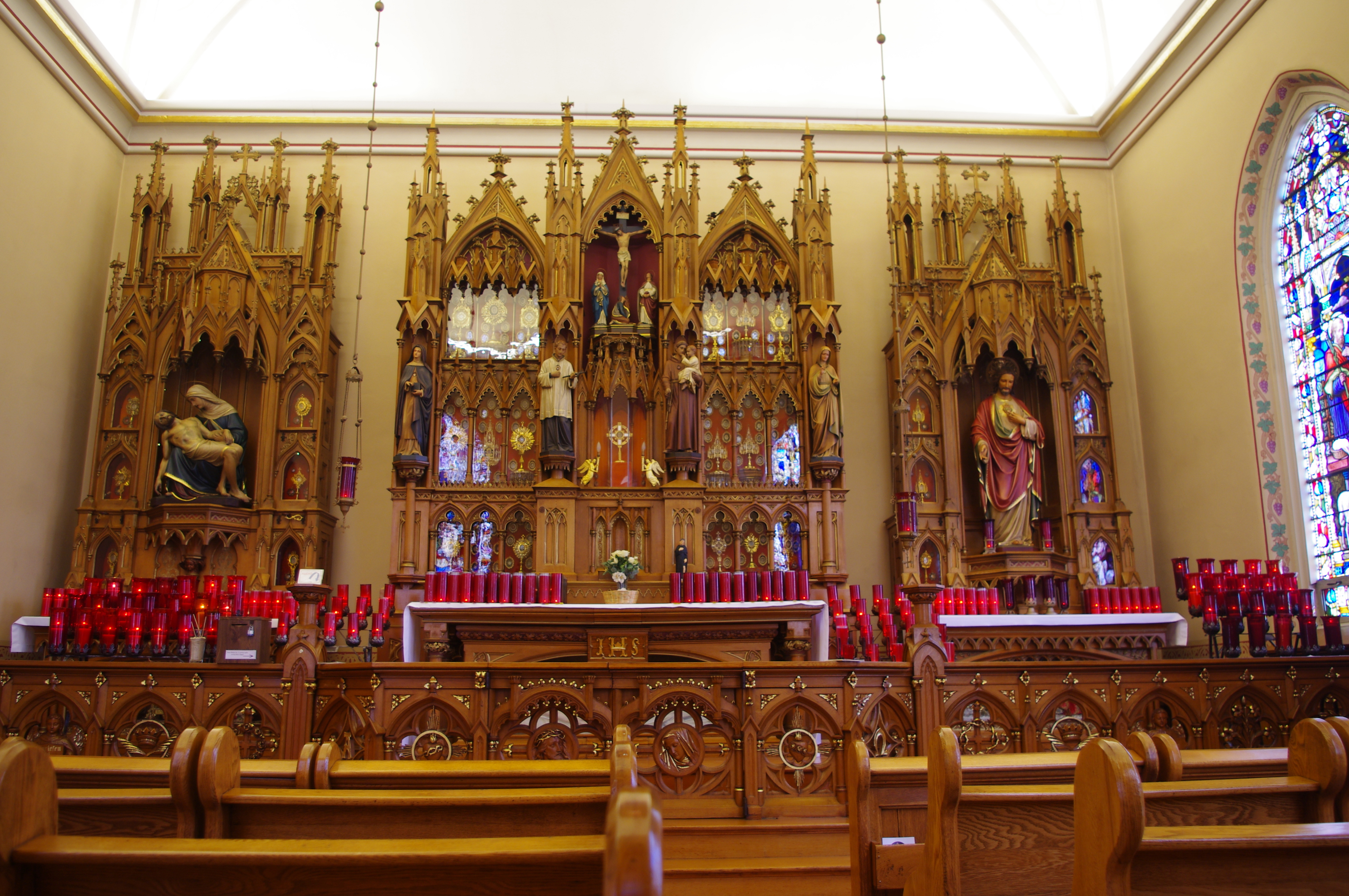
The Relic Chapel interior.

Father Francis de Sales Brunner, the missionary who led the Society of the Precious Blood, was a collector of relics. He was responsible for the first collection of relics in Maria Stein. Over the 19th century other relics were added to the core collection as a way of protecting them from the continuous strife of 19th-century Italy. In 1892 a separate "relic chapel" was established in which Sisters of the Most Precious Blood conducted a continuous vigil.

The collection of relics is the second largest in the United States with 1,100 relics, exceeded in number of relics only by Saint Anthony's Chapel in the Troy Hill neighborhood of Pittsburgh with five thousand.

Relics include body parts (usually bones) from saints or objects that belonged to a saint; they are held in high respect because they were individuals who are believed to have led exemplary lives.

The Sacred Heart Relic Chapel is a kaleidoscope of color, 18th- and 19th-century German carving, and relics distributed throughout. The "relic chapel" is connected to a larger chapel that in turn is the central feature of an interesting 19th century brick convent. A 2007 segment on National Public Radio describes this unique collection of relics. These relics include a splinter of the True Cross and a splinter of bone from St. Peregrine, the patron saint of patients with cancer. Built in 1846, the shrine was placed on the National Register of Historic Places in 1976. The Heritage Museum on the second floor of the convent showcases life during the early years of the community. Even today southern Mercer County is predominantly Catholic, a reflection of 19th-century immigration patterns.

== See also ==
- Maria Stein Catholic Church and Rectory
