= Maria Stein, Ohio =

- Census-designated place
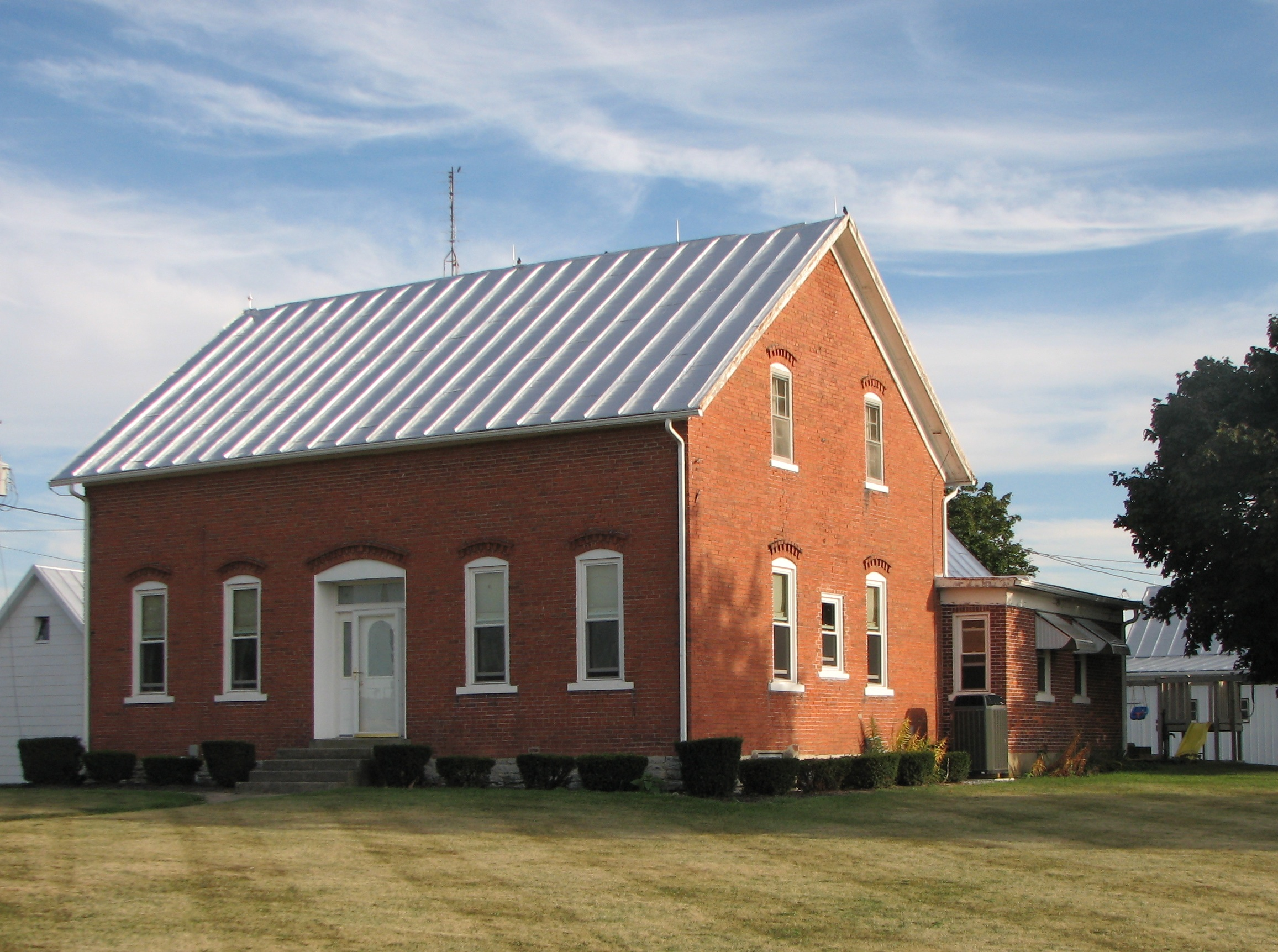
- 19th-century farm house in Maria Stein

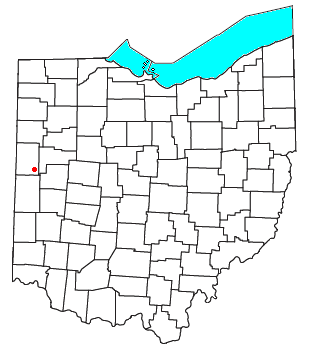
- Location in Ohio
- Coordinates: 40°24′27″N 84°29′36″W
- Country: United States
- State: Ohio
- County: Mercer
- Township: Marion

Area
  - Total: 5.083 sq mi (13.16 km^{2})
  - Land: 5.082 sq mi (13.16 km^{2})
  - Water: 0.001 sq mi (0.0026 km^{2})
- Elevation: 974 ft (297 m)

Population (2020)
  - Total: 1,067
  - Density: 210/sq mi (81/km^{2})
- Time zone: UTC-5 (Eastern (EST))
  - Summer (DST): UTC-4 (EDT)
- ZIP Code: 45860
- FIPS code: 39-47586
- GNIS feature ID: 2812834

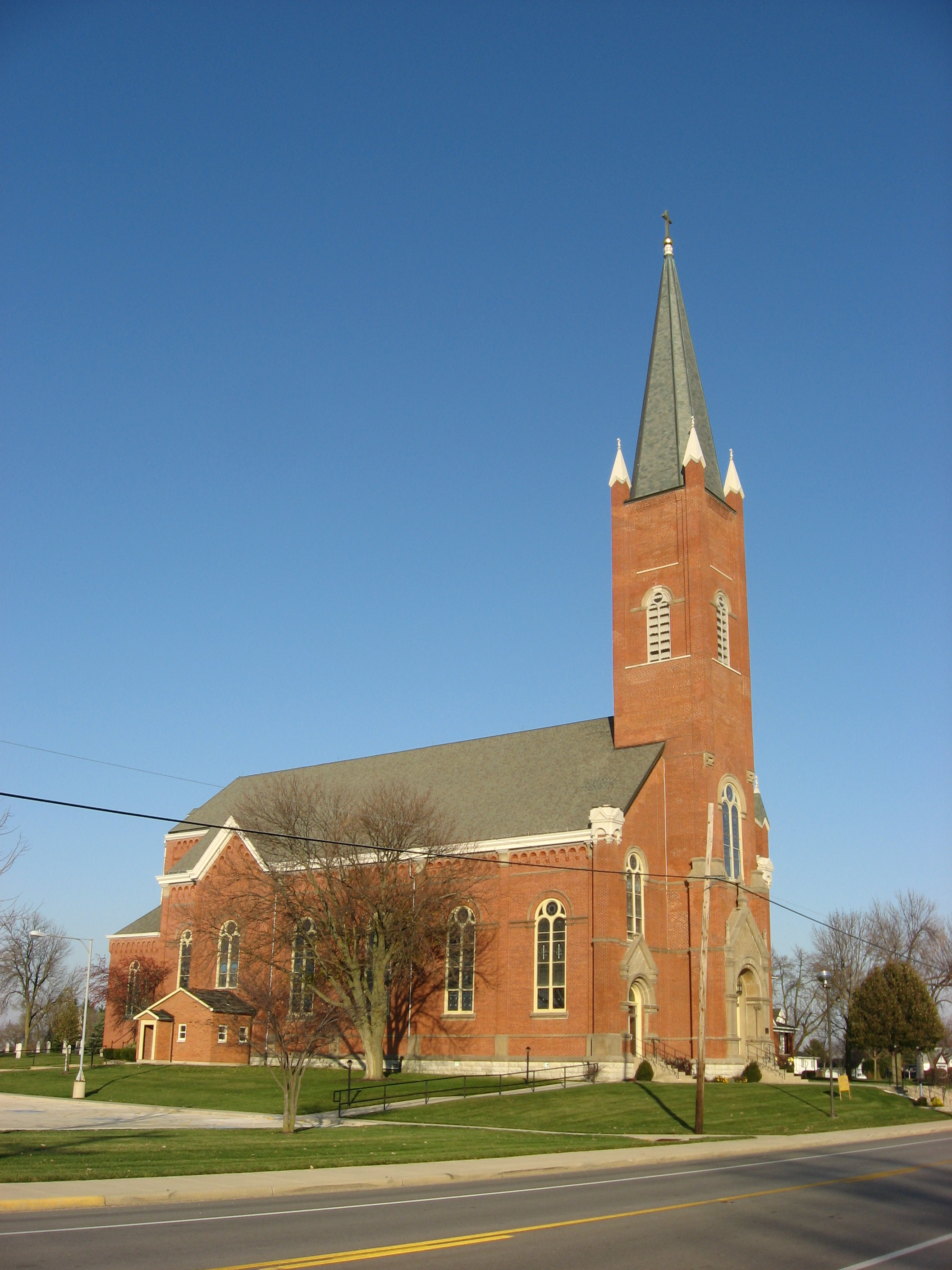
St. John's Church in Maria Stein, formerly one of the many "cross-tipped" steeples in Mercer County

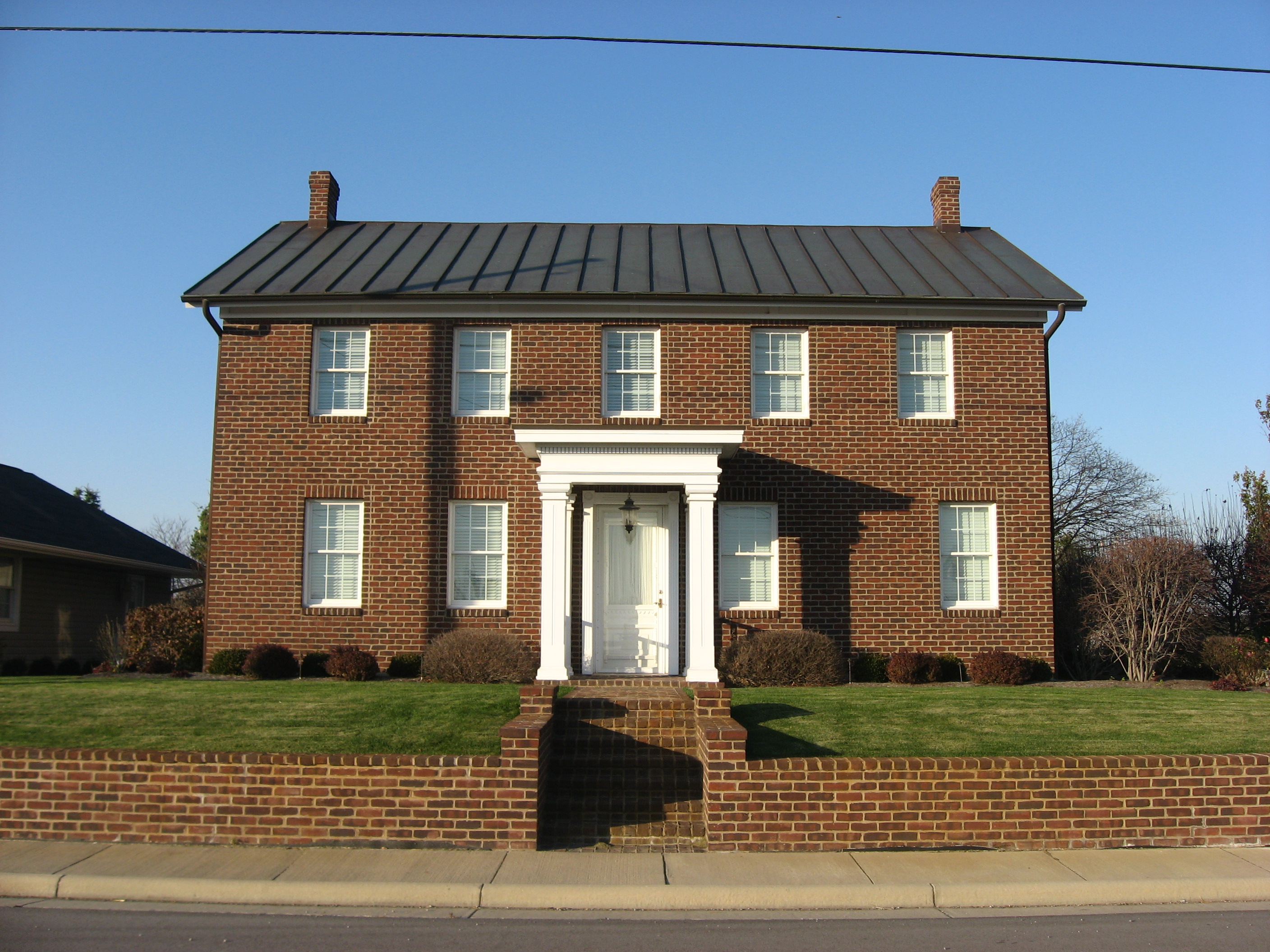
Matthias Gast House

Maria Stein (German, literally "Mary's stone" or "Mary of the Rock") is an unincorporated community and census-designated place in Marion Township, Mercer County, Ohio, United States. As of the 2020 census, the population was 1,067. The community and the Maria Stein Convent lie at the center of the area known as the Land of the Cross-Tipped Churches, where a missionary priest, Father Francis de Sales Brunner, established a number of parishes for German Catholics.

== History ==
The community of St. Johns was established in 1833. Its name was selected because all of its early male settlers bore the name of John. When the Cincinnati, Hamilton, and Dayton Railway expanded through Mercer County some decades later, its surveyors chose a path through the small community of Maria Stein, subsequently named "Station", to the west of St. Johns. As these two communities were separated by only 0.5 miles (0.8 km), many business interests migrated to the vicinity of the railroad, and the two communities eventually merged under the name of Maria Stein.

The origin of the name "Maria Stein" is likely from Metzerlen-Mariastein in Switzerland. This small community, not so far from Basel, has a Benedictine abbey, Mariastein Abbey. Father Francis de Sales Brunner, who established the Missionaries of the Precious Blood order that provides priests for St. John's Church in Maria Stein, Ohio, entered the abbey in 1812 and remained there as a member of the convent until 1829. Although there is no written evidence that it was Father Brunner who named the town of Maria Stein, the erection of a large church and the Shrine of the Holy Relics in Maria Stein is supportive. According to an article by Father Lukas Schenker of Mariastein Abbey, Brunner probably named the convent at Maria Stein after Mariastein Abbey in Switzerland because Brunner donated a painted depiction of the Miraculous Madonna of Mariastein to the convent, after which also the town was named. It is said of this painting that Brunner had it with him when crossing the English Channel in a sailing vessel and was miraculously saved from shipwreck in a bad storm.

The historical character of Maria Stein and many other surrounding communities is evident in their most notable feature, their churches. In this region, every small crossroads community has a substantial church, typically constructed by immigrant German craftsmen in the mid- to late nineteenth century and characterized by a steeple topped with a cross. The churches in Minster, St. Henry, and Maria Stein are the largest examples, but others are found in St. Rose, Cassella, St. Sebastian and Osgood. St. John's Church in Maria Stein was built in 1889.

On May 29, 2025, a large fire destroyed St. John the Baptist Catholic Church. The church had been undergoing renovations on its roof. The fire was detected when construction workers saw smoke and felt the roof's temperature rising rapidly. The exact cause of the fire remains unclear.

A German (almost Dutch) dialect, traced by linguist Professor Wolfgang Fleischhauer of Ohio State University to northwest Germany, was spoken by many members of the community. This dialect has since died out in the 21st century, and the community today only speaks English.

== Shrine of the Holy Relics Chapel ==
Maria Stein is home to the Shrine of the Holy Relics. Relics include body parts (usually bones) from saints or objects that belonged to a saint; they are held in high respect because they were individuals who led exemplary lives and since Catholics believe the artifacts retain and transmit supernatural graces, due to their close connection with the saints. Father Francis de Sales Brunner, the missionary who led the "Missionaries of the Precious Blood" order of priests, was a collector of relics, and he was responsible for the first collection of relics in Maria Stein. During the 19th century other relics were added to the core collection as a way of protecting them from the continuous strife between city states of 19th-century Italy. In 1892 a separate "relic chapel" was established in which Sisters of the Precious Blood conducted a continuous vigil. The collection of relics is the second largest in the United States.

== Geography ==
Maria Stein is in southeastern Mercer County, extending from the center to the eastern edge of Marion Township. The eastern border of the community is the Auglaize County line. The community of Maria Stein is in the western part of the CDP, while St. John's is in the east-central part, 1 mile (1.6 km) east of Maria Stein.

Ohio State Route 119 is the main road through the communities, leading east 7 miles (11 km) to Minster and west 8 miles (13 km) to St. Henry. State Route 716 passes through the western part of the CDP, crossing SR 119 at the Maria Stein community. SR 716 leads north 2 miles (3 km) to Chickasaw and south 4.5 miles (7.2 km) to Osgood. Celina, the Mercer county seat, is 14 miles (23 km) north-northwest of Maria Stein.

According to the U.S. Census Bureau, the Maria Stein CDP has a total area of 5.1 square miles (13.2 km^{2}), of which 0.001 square miles (0.003 km^{2}), or 0.02%, are water. Maria Stein and St. Johns occupy the higher ground in the CDP, with the northern side draining towards Chickasaw Creek, a tributary of Grand Lake St. Marys, on the divide between the Wabash River and St. Marys River watersheds, while the southern side drains toward Mile Creek, a tributary of Loramie Creek, part of the Great Miami River watershed.

== Recreation ==
Maria Stein is approximately 6.5 miles (10.5 km) south of Grand Lake St Marys (Grand Lake St. Marys State Park), a man-made lake constructed in the 19th century to feed the Miami and Erie Canal. The lake is located at the peak of the north–south watershed, dividing water flowing into the Wabash River and thence the Ohio River and Mississippi River from water flowing into the St. Marys River and thence the Maumee River and Lake Erie. The lake has benefited from the Clean Water Act and there has been a resurgence of recreational use over the past 2 decades following improvement in water quality. Many keep fishing or motorized boats at the lake.

The closest movie theaters are in New Bremen and Celina. Approximately 5 miles (8 km) from Maria Stein near the intersection of U.S. Route 127 and State Route 119 is Starlight Drive-In, one of the few remaining drive-in theaters in the state.

There are a variety of country festivals that take place throughout the region during the summer. In late June each year the community hosts the Maria Stein Country Fest, a weekend event that celebrates the rural and religious roots of this small community. The fest is held on the grounds of the Maria Stein Shrine of the Holy Relics. The highlight of the event is tractor square dancing, an event in which four pairs of tractors participate in a precise replica of a square dance. Maria Stein's cultural and religious history is remembered with a pilgrimage from St. John's Catholic Church, a quarter mile away, to the relic chapel grounds. This is a parade with participation by the Knights of St John, an ancient uniformed religious guard, and members of the American Legion.

== Notable people ==
- Cory Luebke, former relief pitcher for the San Diego Padres and Pittsburgh Pirates
- Joseph Oppenheim, the inventor of the first mechanized manure spreader
- Henry Synck, industrialist

== Education ==
Maria Stein is home to Marion Local High School, part of the Marion Local school district. The student body is derived from the communities of Maria Stein, Cassella, Chickasaw, Osgood, St. Rose and St. Sebastian. Marion Local tied for the top public school district in the state in the 2024 Ohio School Report Cards. https://www.toledoblade.com/local/education/2024/09/13/state-report-cards-released-for-area-school-districts/stories/20240913132
