= New Riegel, Ohio =

- Village
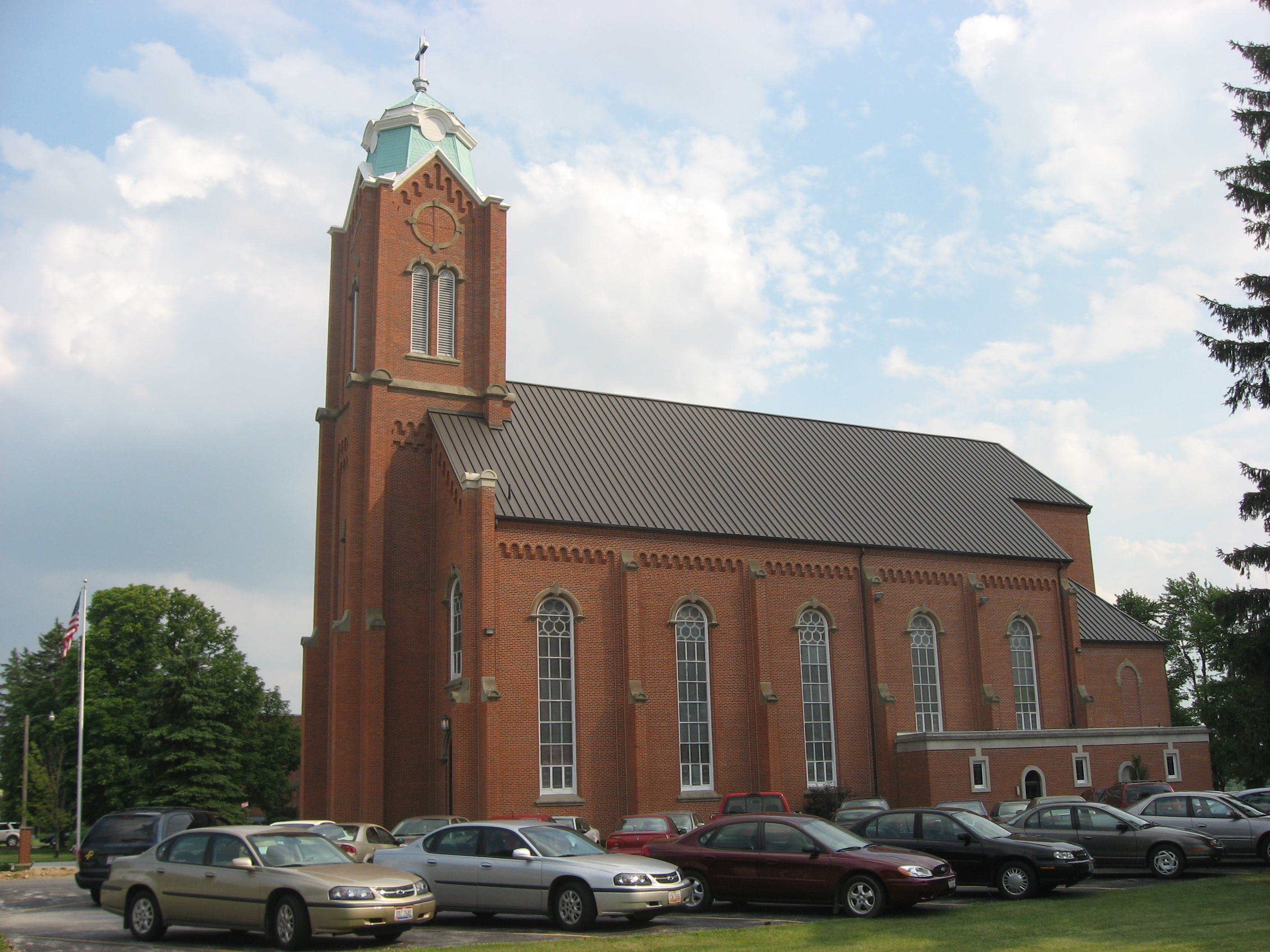
- All Saints Catholic Church, a community landmark

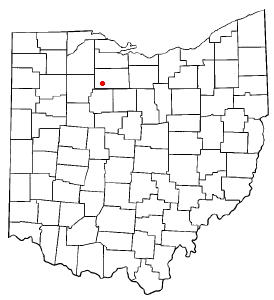
- Location of New Riegel, Ohio

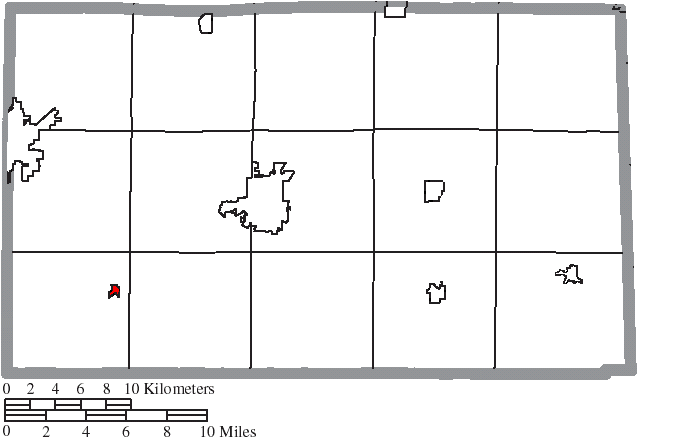
- Location of New Riegel in Seneca County
- Coordinates: 41°03′07″N 83°19′08″W
- Country: United States
- State: Ohio
- County: Seneca

Government
  - Type: Village council

Area
  - Total: 0.20 sq mi (0.52 km^{2})
  - Land: 0.20 sq mi (0.52 km^{2})
  - Water: 0 sq mi (0.00 km^{2})
- Elevation: 833 ft (254 m)

Population (2020)
  - Total: 286
  - Density: 1,427.9/sq mi (551.33/km^{2})
- Time zone: UTC-5 (Eastern (EST))
  - Summer (DST): UTC-4 (EDT)
- ZIP code: 44853
- Area code: 419
- FIPS code: 39-55398
- GNIS feature ID: 2399481

New Riegel is a village in Seneca County, Ohio, United States. The 2020 census enumerated 286 residents at that time.

== History ==
Prior to 1850, New Riegel was variously known as Schindler (named for German immigrant Anton Schindler [1790-1851]) and as Wolf's Creek (purportedly due to the large number of wolves that roamed local woodlands). In 1850, Schindler subdivided his land into 43 lots, which he collectively named for his hometown of Riegel, Germany. Historically, New Riegel was inhabited by Roman Catholic immigrants from Germany, who created a mission community under the patronage of the famous eighth-century Anglo Saxon missionary to present-day Germany, Boniface. Local Roman Catholic immigrants from Switzerland, France, Belgium and Luxembourg were also drawn to the mission prior to creating their own church communities in nearby Frenchtown and Alvada.

Beginning in 1844, the community was served for more than 150 years by the Precious Blood Missionaries and the Precious Blood Sisters of Switzerland. The latter began educating the children of the village in 1845 and continued that ministry for more than a century.

Completed in 1878, the present-day Saint Boniface Catholic Church (now a chapel of All Saints Catholic Church) is the tallest feature in the village and resembles many of the churches built throughout rural northwest Ohio in the late 19th-century, including the churches in nearby Frenchtown and Alvada.

For many years, Mary of the Crib Convent, an equally large structure occupied by the Precious Blood Sisters, stood to the north of the church, until it was destroyed by fire on June 24, 2001.

Many of the nuns and some of the priests and brothers who served the community are buried at St. Boniface Catholic Cemetery, which contains more than 2,750 marked graves. The priests lived in a red brick rectory built in 1904 to the south of the church, and the elementary school completed just south of the rectory in 1927, still stands as well. This school was built to replace the old school house to the north of the church (on the site of the present-day church parking lot), which was razed in 1927.

With the advent of public education in New Riegel in 1876, New Riegel Local Schools rented the church's elementary school until January 2003, when a new PK-12 school was completed. Prior to renting the parish facility, the public school system operated a German school on the site of the present-day city hall (to which the village jail was later attached in 1883), then at a brick school house built in 1911 just west of the present-day American Legion hall. Until the 1990s, the children of New Riegel were bused to the parish facility at 8:00 a.m., for daily mass or religious education, followed by public school instruction in the same facility beginning at 8:30 a.m.

== Geography ==
According to the United States Census Bureau, the village has a total area of 0.20 square miles (0.52 km^{2}), all land.

=== Climate ===
New Riegel's climate features warm, muggy summers and cold, dry winters, and is classified as a humid continental climate (Köppen Dfa).

Climate data for New Riegel, Ohio
Month	Jan	Feb	Mar	Apr	May	Jun	Jul	Aug	Sep	Oct	Nov	Dec	Year
Mean daily maximum °F (°C)	33.0 (0.6)	36.5 (2.5)	47.1 (8.4)	60.5 (15.8)	71.0 (21.7)	80.4 (26.9)	83.9 (28.8)	82.3 (27.9)	76.0 (24.4)	63.5 (17.5)	50.4 (10.2)	37.0 (2.8)	60.1 (15.6)
Mean daily minimum °F (°C)	18.3 (−7.6)	20.7 (−6.3)	28.4 (−2.0)	38.8 (3.8)	49.3 (9.6)	59.2 (15.1)	62.8 (17.1)	60.8 (16.0)	53.0 (11.7)	42.1 (5.6)	33.3 (0.7)	23.1 (−4.9)	40.8 (4.9)
Average precipitation inches (mm)	2.1 (53)	1.9 (48)	2.4 (61)	3.4 (86)	4.1 (100)	4.1 (100)	3.9 (99)	3.4 (86)	3.0 (76)	2.5 (64)	3.1 (79)	2.6 (66)	36.5 (918)
Average snowfall inches (cm)	8.1 (21)	5.6 (14)	4 (10)	1.1 (2.8)	0 (0)	0 (0)	0 (0)	0 (0)	0.1 (0.25)	0.1 (0.25)	1.0 (2.5)	5.7 (14)	25.7 (64.8)
Average precipitation days	11	9	10	12	12	11	10	9	8	9	11	12	124

== Demographics ==
Historical population
Census	Pop.	Note	%±
1870	236		—
1880	367		55.5%
1890	393		7.1%
1900	298		−24.2%
1910	268		−10.1%
1920	246		−8.2%
1930	239		−2.8%
1940	264		10.5%
1950	317		20.1%
1960	349		10.1%
1970	340		−2.6%
1980	329		−3.2%
1990	298		−9.4%
2000	226		−24.2%
2010	249		10.2%
2020	286		14.9%
U.S. Decennial Census

=== 2020 census ===
The 2020 decennial U.S. census of New Riegel enumerated 286 residents in 117 households, 276 of whom were Caucasian and 10 were Latinx. The 2020 American Community Survey 5-Year Estimates state that 64.2% of residents are employed, the median household income in New Riegel is $55,417, that 18.5% of residents possess a bachelor degree or higher, and that 3.0% are without health care coverage.

=== 2010 census ===
As of the census of 2010, there were 249 people, 110 households, and 68 families living in the village. The population density was 1,245.0 inhabitants per square mile (480.7/km^{2}). There were 116 housing units at an average density of 580.0 per square mile (223.9/km^{2}). The racial makeup of the village was 98.8% White, 0.8% African American, and 0.4% Pacific Islander. Hispanic or Latino of any race were 2.0% of the population.

There were 110 households, of which 25.5% had children under the age of 18 living with them, 47.3% were married couples living together, 10.9% had a female householder with no husband present, 3.6% had a male householder with no wife present, and 38.2% were non-families. 36.4% of all households were made up of individuals, and 16.3% had someone living alone who was 65 years of age or older. The average household size was 2.25 and the average family size was 2.90.

The median age in the village was 41.9 years. 22.1% of residents were under the age of 18; 8.3% were between the ages of 18 and 24; 24% were from 25 to 44; 25.6% were from 45 to 64; and 19.7% were 65 years of age or older. The gender makeup of the village was 49.4% male and 50.6% female.

=== 2000 census ===
As of the census of 2000, there were 226 people, 100 households, and 57 families living in the village. The population density was 1,141.2 inhabitants per square mile (440.6/km^{2}). There were 102 housing units at an average density of 515.1 per square mile (198.9/km^{2}). The racial makeup of the village was 99.56% White, 0.44% from other races. Hispanic or Latino of any race were 0.88% of the population.

There were 100 households, out of which 24.0% had children under the age of 18 living with them, 49.0% were married couples living together, 6.0% had a female householder with no husband present, and 43.0% were non-families. 40.0% of all households were made up of individuals, and 22.0% had someone living alone who was 65 years of age or older. The average household size was 2.24 and the average family size was 2.98.

In the village, the population was spread out, with 21.7% under the age of 18, 11.1% from 18 to 24, 23.0% from 25 to 44, 21.2% from 45 to 64, and 23.0% who were 65 years of age or older. The median age was 39 years. For every 100 females there were 88.3 males. For every 100 females age 18 and over, there were 90.3 males.

The median income for a household in the village was $31,000, and the median income for a family was $46,667. Males had a median income of $32,500 versus $19,286 for females. The per capita income for the village was $17,409. About 1.9% of families and 4.1% of the population were below the poverty line, including none of those under the age of eighteen and 22.0% of those sixty-five or over.

== Landmarks ==
- A small "downtown district," containing the village post office, grocery store, restaurant, bar, bank and other small businesses.
- New Riegel High School (occupied in 2003)
- Saint Boniface Catholic Church (now All Saints Chapel (New Riegel)
- Brick school house, built in 1911, to the west of the American Legion hall
- New Riegel grain elevator
