= Alvada, Ohio =

- Unincorporated community
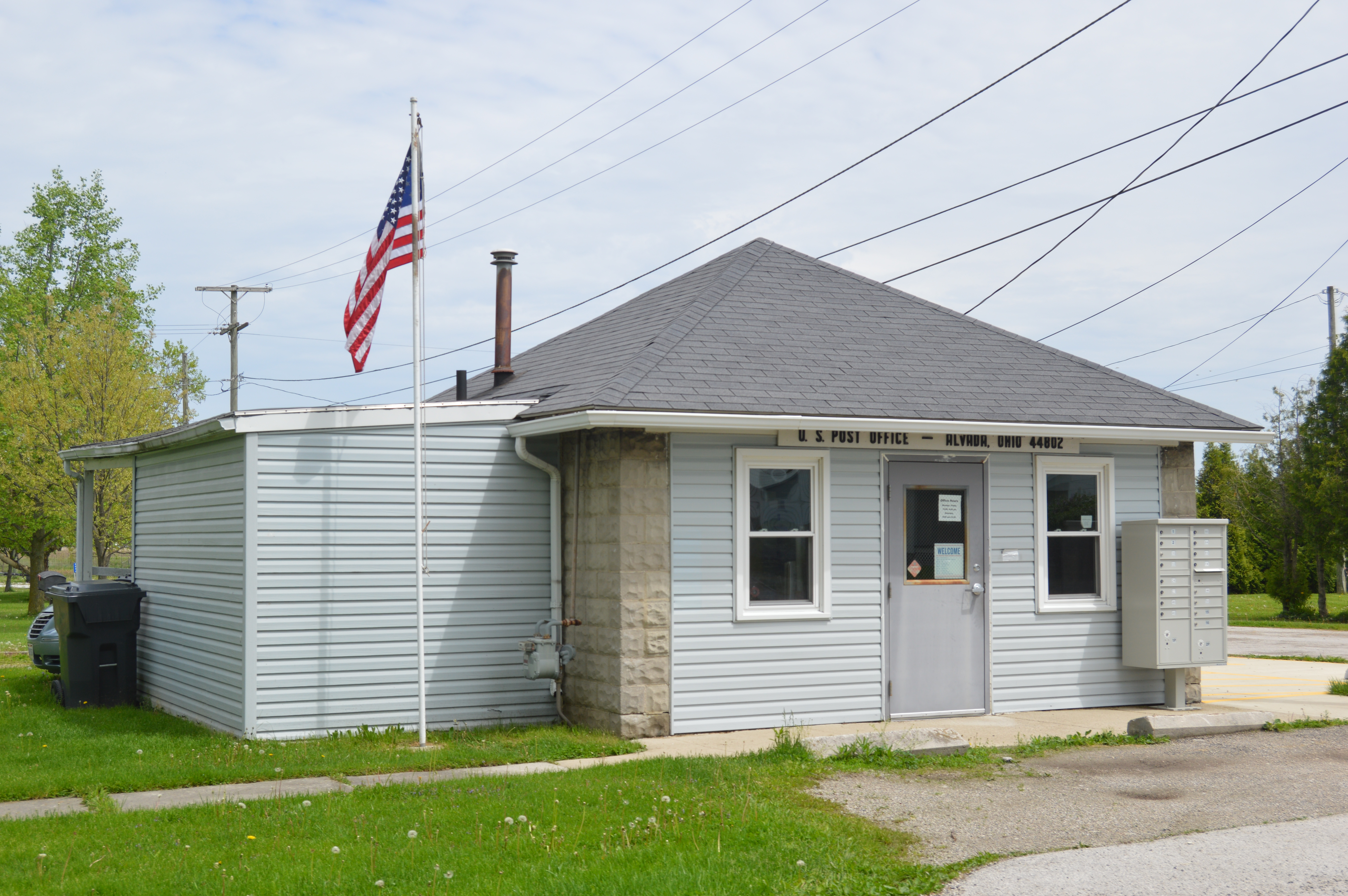
- Post office

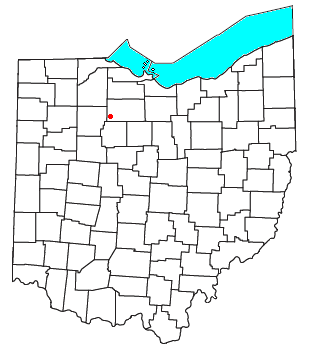
- Location of Alvada, Ohio
- Coordinates: 41°03′01″N 83°24′07″W
- Country: United States
- State: Ohio
- County: Seneca
- Township: Big Spring
- Elevation: 846 ft (258 m)
- Time zone: UTC-5 (Eastern (EST))
  - Summer (DST): UTC-4 (EDT)
- ZIP codes: 44802
- GNIS feature ID: 1064317

Alvada (/ælˈveɪdə/ al-VAY-də) is an unincorporated community in western Big Spring Township, Seneca County, Ohio, United States. It has a post office with the ZIP code 44802. It is located along the concurrency of U.S. Route 23 and State Route 199.

== History ==
A post office called Alvada has been in operation since 1877. By 1880, Alvada had 63 inhabitants.

== Landmarks ==
- Ss. Peter & Paul Catholic Church, which, until October 2023, when all structures were torn down, included a large, neo-gothic, red-brick church, a two-story school house, and a cemetery.
