= Immaculate Conception Catholic Church (Botkins, Ohio) =

Historic church in Ohio, United States

- Botkins Elementary School; Immaculate Conception Rectory at Botkins
- U.S. National Register of Historic Places
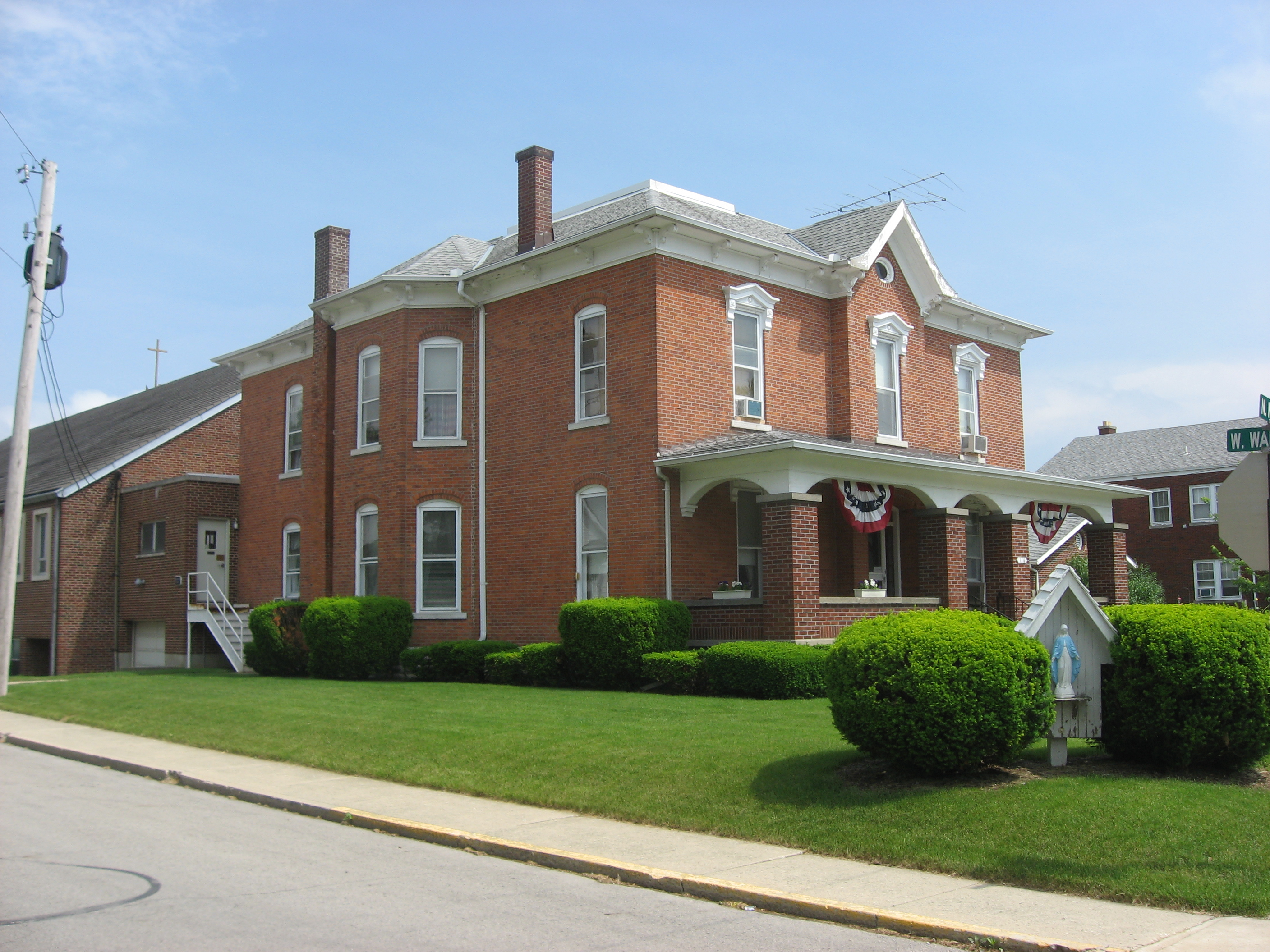
- Front and side of the parish rectory

- Location within Ohio Location within the United States
- Location: 116 N. Mill St. (rectory); Main St. (school)
- Nearest city: Botkins, Ohio
- Coordinates: 40°28′9.5″N 84°10′58″W
- Area: less than one acre
- Built: 1887 (rectory); 1921 (school)
- Architectural style: Italian Villa (rectory); unspecified (school)
- MPS: Cross-Tipped Churches of Ohio TR
- NRHP reference No.: 79002876 (rectory); 79002851 (school)
- Added to NRHP: July 26, 1979

Immaculate Conception Catholic Church is a Roman Catholic parish in Botkins, Ohio, United States. Erected in 1865, the parish owns a complex of buildings constructed in a wide range of years, including two that have been designated as historic sites.

== Early parish history ==
Immaculate Conception parish was organized in 1865 among a population of twenty-eight poor German immigrant families. A few Catholic families had settled in the vicinity of the village many years before, but their poverty had prevented them from supporting a pastor; accordingly, Mass was celebrated only occasionally by travelling priests. For many years, they worshipped in private homes or in a former schoolhouse, although a log church was built by the early 1860s. Soon after the creation of the parish, the members began to take measures to replace their church, and a new brick building was completed in 1867. Erected at a cost of approximately $8,000, this structure measured 45 feet (14 m) by 85 feet (26 m), and it was crowned by a respectable steeple. As the years passed, the parish grew; by 1883, its membership was eighty-two families. Increased membership permitted improvements to the church: it was remodelled and embellished by painter F.H. Hefele in 1898, and ornate stained glass windows were installed in 1899. From the parish's earliest years, it possessed a cemetery: a small plot 1 mile (1.6 km) north of Botkins was used for a time, and it was soon replaced by a more suitable location on the village's northern edge.

== Rectory ==
Many parishes in the region constructed rectories for their pastors in accordance with an archiepiscopal directive in the early twentieth century. Most of these houses are simple brick structures influenced by the style of the Sears Roebuck catalog of the day. The rectory at Botkins, built before this directive, is significantly different: its architecture is an ornate Italianate. Its brick walls are built on a foundation of limestone, and the building is covered with a roof of asphalt. This two-story house was the second rectory owned by the parish; its members bought and converted a house in 1875 before erecting the present structure in 1887 at a cost of $3,000.

== School ==
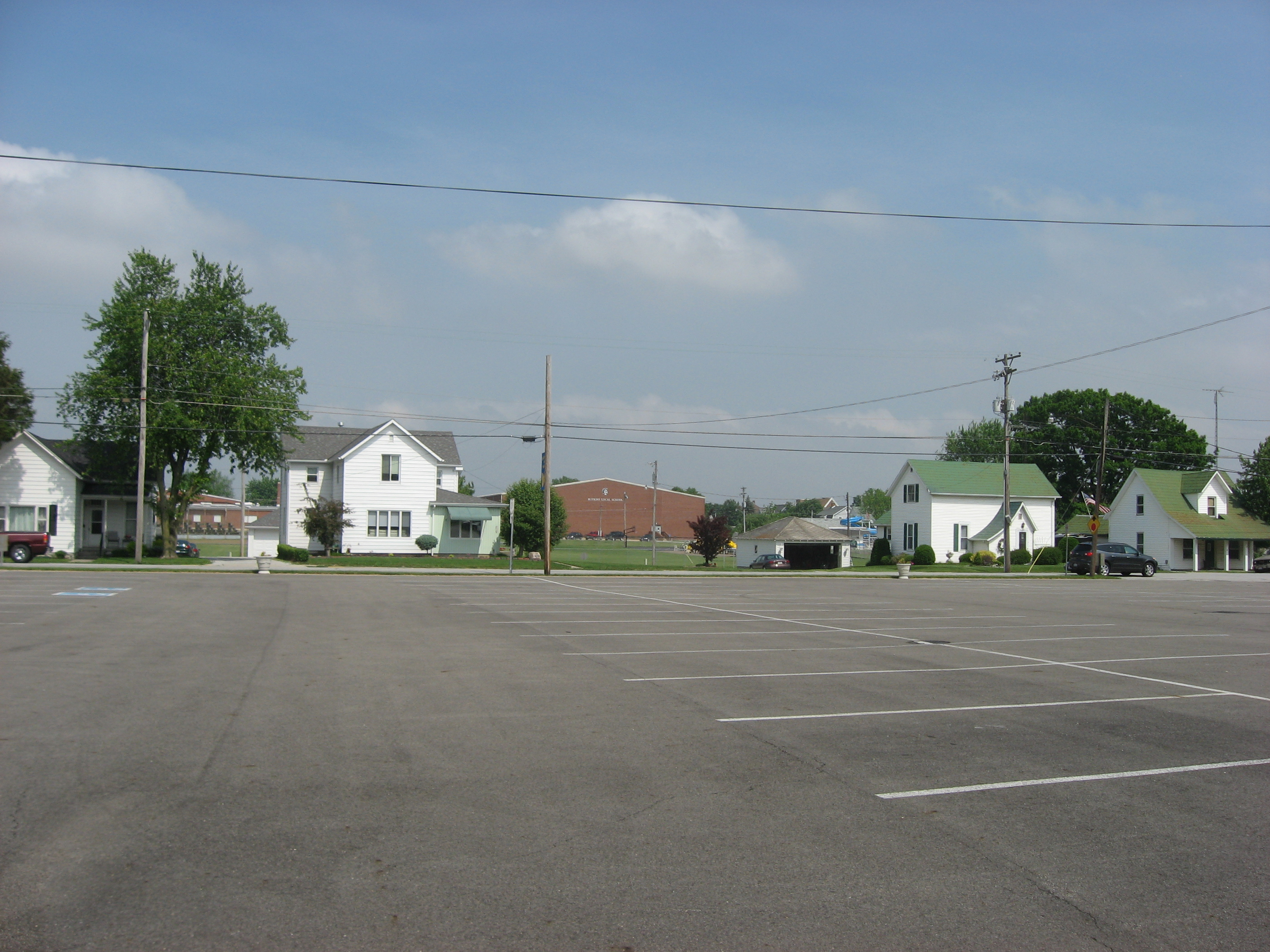
Parking lot on the site of the school

Many parishes in the region also operated parish schools from their earliest years. Some rural parishes, such as St. Rose's in St. Rose and St. Wendelin's in Wendelin, built one-room schools for their children in the middle or late nineteenth century, while parishes such as St. Joseph's in Wapakoneta and St. John's in Fryburg erected larger two-story structures around the beginning of the twentieth century. Immaculate Conception's school was founded in 1881, when the parish purchased a church building formerly used by the Botkins Methodist Church. In 1883, the school's enrollment was ninety-three children: forty-nine boys and forty-four girls. A new parish school building was erected in 1921, adjacent to the church. This building was built of brick and supported by a concrete foundation; it was a two-story building with a basement; among its most significant architectural features were the pillars at its entrance and the sharp contrasts at corners between walls. In this way, it was similar to parish schools at Celina and Coldwater, which were architecturally very similar to Botkins and to each other, and which were erected at a similar point in time.

== Recent history ==
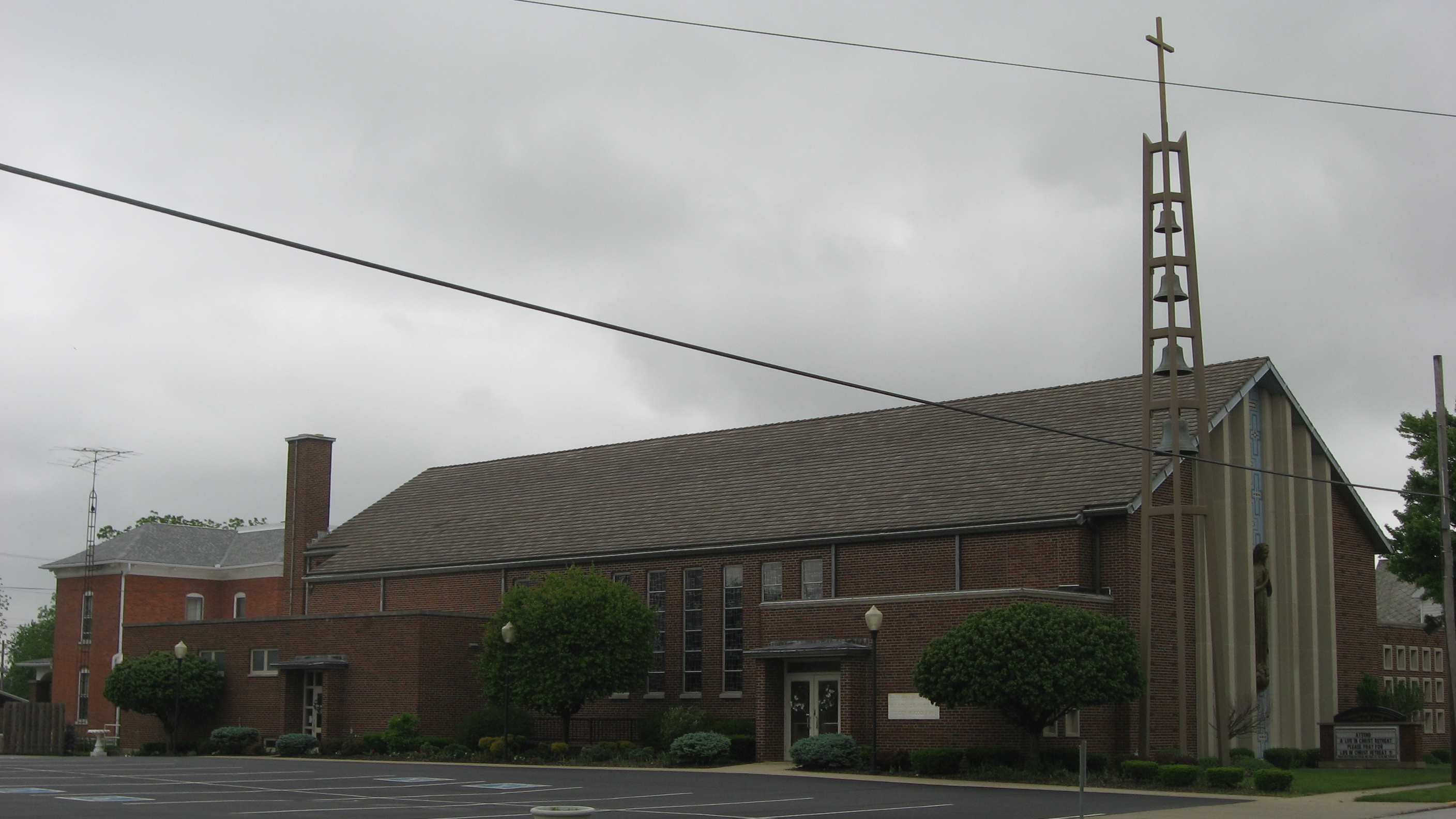
The current church building

In 1961, the parish replaced its church building with a modern structure; however, the rectory and school were left in place. These two buildings were listed on the National Register of Historic Places in 1979: the school qualified because of its architecture, and the rectory both because of its architecture and because of its contribution to statewide history. Thirty-four other buildings in western Ohio were listed on the Register at the same time as part of the "Cross-Tipped Churches of Ohio Thematic Resources," a group of Catholic churches and church-related properties in rural western Ohio. These massive churches are the namesake of the region, which has been nicknamed the "Land of the Cross-Tipped Churches."

Today, Immaculate Conception is an active parish of the Archdiocese of Cincinnati. It is clustered with Sacred Heart Parish in McCartyville and St. Lawrence Parish in Rhine, and the entire cluster is a part of the Sidney Deanery. Although the rectory retains its location adjacent to the church, the school has been destroyed, and a parking lot now sits in its place. This destruction was predicted in 1979 when the school was nominated for inclusion on the Register; the nominators noted that officials' demands for progress endangered many parish schools. Ultimately, the destruction was a result of the expansion of the local elementary school in 1985: until this point, the Botkins Local School District had been renting the unused parish school building, but the increased space produced by the expansion rendered the old school superfluous. Despite its destruction, the school remains on the National Register.
