= Land of the Cross-Tipped Churches =

The Land of the Cross-Tipped Churches is a rural region primarily in the western part of the U.S. state of Ohio, centered near Maria Stein in Mercer County. Its name is derived from the dense concentration of large Catholic churches that dominate the area's architecture. These and other buildings were constructed by the Society of the Most Precious Blood under the oversight of the missionary priest Francis de Sales Brunner. Under his leadership, the Society founded many churches and schools in the region, as well as several seminaries.

The earliest buildings from the mid-19th century were mostly small wooden or simple brick structures. Most of these were replaced in later construction periods; only two from this generation are still in use as churches.

Many of the massive Gothic revival churches that remain today were built in the late 19th century and early 20th century by Anton DeCurtins or his descendants. The churches of the region have changed little since the early 20th century, and only one new parish has been established since 1925.

== Historic buildings ==
In 1976, many churches in the Land of the Cross-Tipped Churches were added to the National Register of Historic Places, along with a small number of church-related buildings. These buildings are detailed in the chart below; each is listed under the name by which it appears on the Register.

| | Name | Patron | Date | Location | County | Photograph |
|---|---|---|---|---|---|---|
| 1 | Botkins Elementary School | N/A | 1921 | Botkins: Main St. 40°28′8.8″N 84°10′57.5″W | Shelby | |
| 2 | Cassella Catholic Church and Rectory | Nativity of the Blessed Virgin Mary | 1858 | Marion Township: State Route 119 in Cassella; 40°24′24″N 84°33′3″W | Mercer | |
| 3 | Chickasaw School and Rectory | N/A | 1904 | Chickasaw: Maple St. 40°26′10″N 84°29′35″W | Mercer | |
| 4 | Holy Trinity Catholic Church Complex | Holy Trinity | 1899 | Coldwater: E. Main and 2nd Sts. 40°28′49″N 84°37′42″W | Mercer | |
| 5 | Egypt Catholic Church and Rectory | St. Joseph | 1887 | Jackson Township: junction of Minster-Egypt Rd. and State Route 364 at Egypt; 40°23′5″N 84°26′4″W | Auglaize | |
| 6 | Glynwood Catholic Church | St. Patrick | 1883 | Moulton Township: 6 miles northeast of St. Marys on Glynwood Rd. in Glynwood; 40°34′59″N 84°19′5″W | Auglaize | |
| 7 | Gruenwald Convent | N/A | 1854 | Marion Township: 0.5 miles south of Cassella; 40°24′1″N 84°33′3″W | Mercer | |
| 8 | Holy Family Catholic Church | Holy Family | 1866 | Wayne Township: State Route 185 at Frenchtown; 40°14′46″N 84°31′25″W | Darke | |
| 9 | Holy Rosary Catholic Church | Holy Rosary | 1867 | St. Marys: junction of E. Spring and S. Pine Sts. 40°32′42″N 84°22′58″W | Auglaize | |
| 10 | Immaculate Conception Catholic Church Complex | Immaculate Conception | 1903 | Celina: Anthony and Walnut Sts. 40°33′7″N 84°34′22″W | Mercer | |
| 11 | Immaculate Conception Rectory at Botkins | Immaculate Conception | 1887 | Botkins: 116 N. Mill St. 40°28′9.6″N 84°10′57.8″W | Shelby | |
| 12 | Maria Stein Catholic Church and Rectory | St. John the Baptist | 1889 | Marion Township: St. John's Rd. and State Route 119 in Maria Stein; 40°24′29″N 84°28′22″W | Mercer | |
| 13 | Maria Stein Convent | N/A | 1846 | Marion Township: St. John's and Rolfes Rd. in Maria Stein; 40°24′57″N 84°28′34″W | Mercer | |
| 14 | Minster Elementary School | N/A | 1904 | Minster: Lincoln St. 40°23′42″N 84°22′44″W | Auglaize | |
| 15 | Philothea Catholic Church and Priest House | St. Mary | 1871 | Butler Township: Philothea Rd & Tangeman Rd in Philothea, between St. Henry and Coldwater; 40°27′3″N 84°39′18″W | Mercer | |
| 16 | Sacred Heart of Jesus Rectory | Sacred Heart of Jesus | 1911 | Van Buren Township: State Routes 29 and 119 at McCartyville; 40°23′42.4″N 84°15′16.6″W | Shelby | |
| 17 | St. Aloysius Catholic Church | St. Aloysius | 1875 | Marion Township: U.S. Route 127 and State Route 274, west of Carthagena; 40°26′11″N 84°34′12″W | Mercer | |
| 18 | St. Anthony Catholic Church, Padua | St. Anthony | 1869 | Washington Township: State Route 49 and St. Anthony Rd. in Padua; 40°30′32″N 84°47′7″W | Mercer | |
| 19 | St. Augustine Catholic Church | St. Augustine | 1848 | Minster: N. Hanover St. 40°23′40″N 84°22′47″W | Auglaize | |
| 20 | St. Bernard Catholic Church and Rectory | St. Bernard | 1906 | Burkettsville: Main St. 40°21′8″N 84°38′45″W | Mercer | |
| 21 | St. Charles Seminary and Chapel | St. Charles | 1906 | Marion Township: 0.5 miles south of Carthagena, off U.S. Route 127; 40°25′57″N 84°33′48″W | Mercer | |
| 22 | St. Francis Catholic Church and Rectory | St. Francis | 1906 | Granville Township: Cranberry and Ft. Recovery-Minster Rd. in Cranberry Prairie; 40°23′34″N 84°34′55″W | Mercer | |
| 23 | St. Henry Catholic Church | St. Henry | 1897 | St. Henry: Main St. 40°25′3″N 84°38′19″W | Mercer | |
| 24 | St. John Catholic Church and Parish Hall | St. John | 1850 | Pusheta Township: southwestern corner of Schlemel and Van Buren Sts. in Fryburg; 40°30′57.5″N 84°8′54.6″W | Auglaize | |
| 25 | St. Joseph Catholic Church and Rectory | St. Joseph | 1866 | Recovery Township: Sawmill and St. Joe Rds. in St. Joe; 40°25′41″N 84°44′19″W | Mercer | |
| 26 | St. Joseph Catholic Church and School | St. Joseph | 1899 | Wapakoneta: 309 S. Perry St. 40°34′4″N 84°11′43″W | Auglaize | |
| 27 | St. Louis Catholic Church and Rectory | St. Louis | 1914 | North Star: east of U.S. Route 127; 40°19′29″N 84°34′13″W | Darke | |
| 28 | St. Michael Catholic Church Complex | St. Michael | 1849 | Fort Loramie: State Route 705 east of State Route 66; 40°21′5″N 84°22′19″W | Shelby | |
| 29 | St. Nicholas Catholic Church and Rectory | St. Nicholas | 1907 | Osgood: State Route 705 and Washington St. 40°20′26″N 84°29′33″W | Darke | |
| 30 | St. Patrick Catholic Church and Rectory | St. Patrick | 1915 | Van Buren Township: Hoying and Wright-Puthoff Rds. in St. Patrick; 40°22′13.1″N 84°17′19″W | Shelby | |
| 31 | St. Paul's Catholic Church and Rectory | St. Paul | 1889 | Gibson Township: junction of Sharpsburg and Meiring Rds. in Sharpsburg; 40°22′2″N 84°42′41″W | Mercer | |
| 32 | St. Peter Catholic Church and Rectory | St. Peter | 1904 | Recovery Township: St. Peter and Philothea Rds. in St. Peter; 40°27′3″N 84°44′48″W | Mercer | |
| 33 | St. Remy Catholic Church | St. Remy | 1890 | Russia: Main St. and Russia-Versailles Rd. 40°14′0.68″N 84°24′53.25″W | Shelby | |
| 34 | St. Rose Catholic Church Complex | St. Rose | 1892 | Marion Township: Main St. in St. Rose; 40°24′26″N 84°30′53″W | Mercer | |
| 35 | St. Sebastian Catholic Church and Rectory | St. Sebastian | 1904 | Marion Township: Sebastian Rd. and State Route 716A in Sebastian; 40°26′41.65″N 84°31′1.13″W | Mercer | |
| 36 | St. Wendelin Catholic Church, School, and Rectory | St. Wendelin | 1870 | Recovery Township: Ft. Recovery-Minster Rd. and Township Line in Wendelin; 40°24′0″N 84°41′27″W | Mercer | |
