= St. Aloysius Catholic Church (Carthagena, Ohio) =

- U.S. National Register of Historic Places
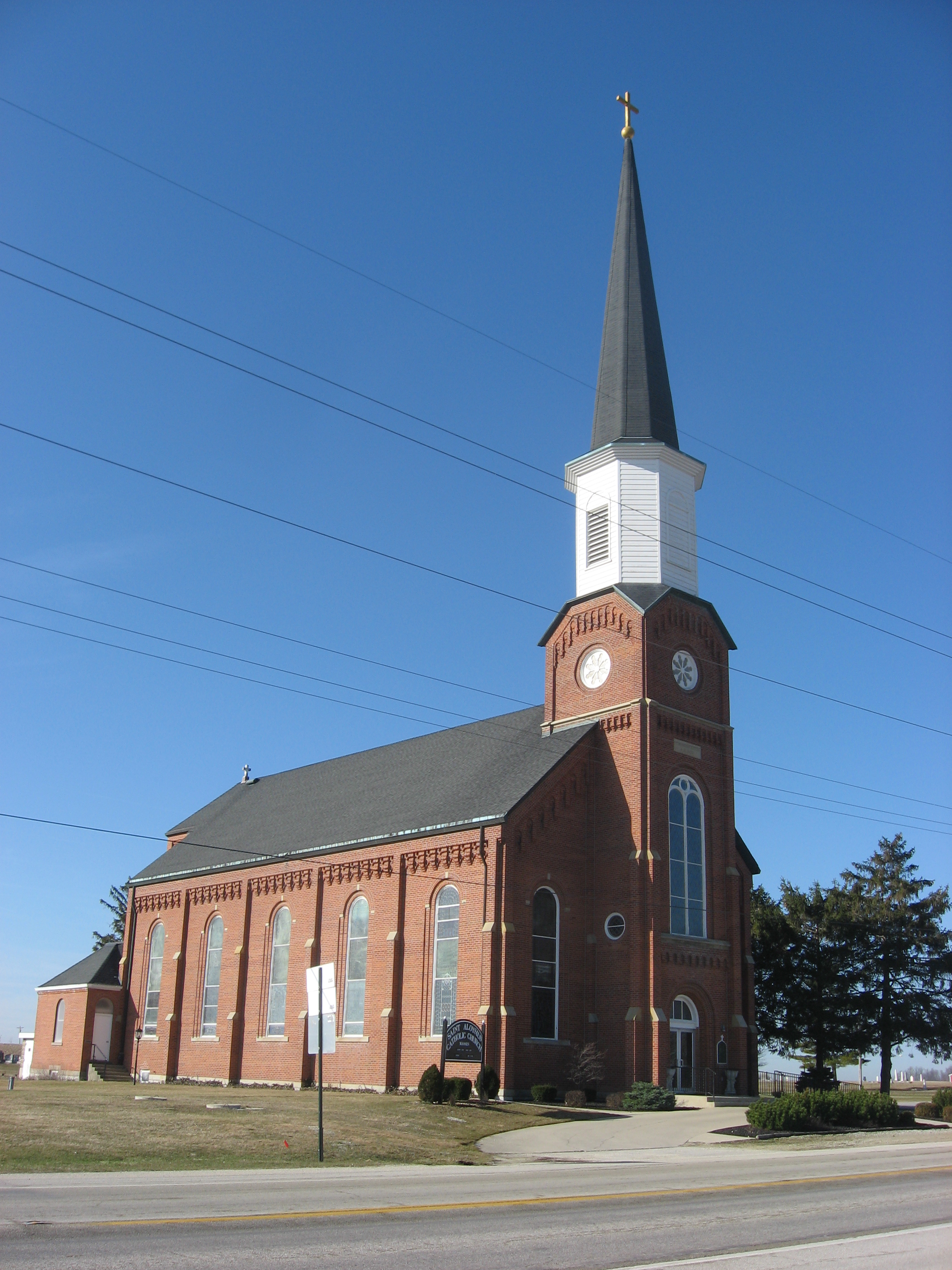
- Front and eastern side of the church

- Location within Ohio Location within the United States
- Location: Junction of U.S. Route 127 and State Route 274 at Carthagena, Ohio
- Coordinates: 40°26′11″N 84°34′12″W
- Area: 15 acres (6.1 ha)
- Built: 1875
- Architect: Anton DeCurtins
- Architectural style: Gothic Revival
- MPS: Cross-Tipped Churches of Ohio TR
- NRHP reference No.: 79002824
- Added to NRHP: July 26, 1979

St. Aloysius Catholic Church is a historic Catholic church in Carthagena, an unincorporated community in Marion Township, Mercer County, Ohio, United States. Built in the late nineteenth century, it remains the home of an active parish, and it has been designated a historic site because of its well-preserved architecture.

== Early parish history ==
Local Catholics began to purchase large amounts of land in Cathagena from black people in 1856; the parish grew strong enough to establish a school and a cemetery in 1860, and St. Aloysius' Church was canonically erected in 1865. In their earliest years, the people worshipped in the chapel of the adjacent St. Charles Seminary. Throughout its history, the church has been significantly influenced by the seminary, which trained the priests of the Missionaries of the Precious Blood and provided pastors for the church.

As its membership grew, the parish decided to construct a church building. Plans were laid and construction began in 1875; the cornerstone was laid in May 1877, and the church was consecrated on June 30, 1878; the parishioners had performed the construction work themselves. Under the pastorate of Gregory Jüssel, the church was greatly modified in the summer of 1905; only the tower and three of the walls remain from the original structure.

== Church building ==
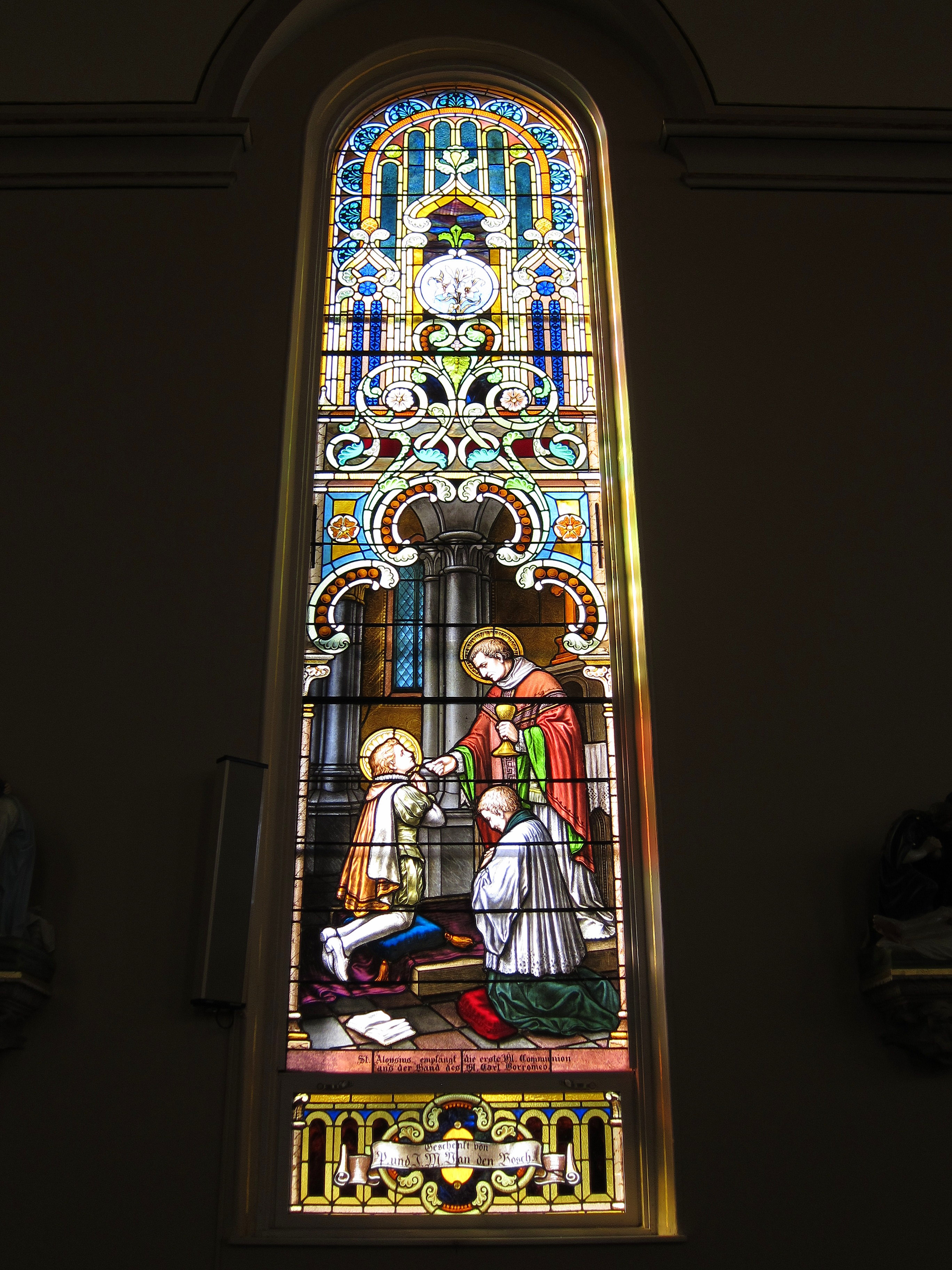
Stained glass window of St. Aloysius receiving his first Communion from St. Charles

St. Aloysius Church is a Gothic Revival structure, five bays long and three bays wide, and officially one story high. Built of brick, laid in a stretcher bond, the walls rest on a foundation of stone rubble from Piqua, which includes a basement. A gabled roof of asphalt covers the rectangular church, which measures 85 feet (26 m) long and 45 feet (14 m) wide. One of the church's most prominent architectural elements is its tower: equipped with a white-painted wooden belfry and a tall spire, the tower rests on its own walls, 2 feet (0.61 m) thick. The entire building cost approximately $7,500 to erect; much of this amount was donated by other nearby parishes. Inside, the church's sanctuary includes elements such as white-painted altars and multiple sizes of pews: large pews for adults, and miniature pews for children. The interior is lit partially by many large stained glass windows; added more than 25 years after the church was completed, these windows were purchased by individual families within the parish. Few elements of the church are original from the 1870s. The middle of 1905 saw the completion of a wide range of alterations, including the removal of the original interior, the addition of a sacristy, the placement of the present stained glass windows, and the expansion of the sanctuary.

Architectural historians have divided the Precious Blood-related churches of western Ohio into four generations. Most of the first-generation churches were small frame structures; only four of these buildings (three of which are brick) – have survived; two have been converted for other purposes, one has been greatly modified, and only St. John's Church in Fryburg remains in a condition resembling its original state. St. Aloysius is a member of the second generation of churches, which comprises the buildings completed between 1865 and 1885. Most of these buildings were simple brick structures with small bell towers; conversely, St. Aloysius was the first church in the region to be designed with a tall tower. Its construction was a turning point in the ecclesiastical architecture of the region: after its construction, most of the area's churches were modified by the construction of similar towers, and later structures were generally designed likewise. Furthermore, Anton DeCurtins's commission to design the church at Carthagena, where he lived, led to similar requests from many other parishes: the churches of the third generation, built between 1885 and 1905, were characteristically large brick High Gothic Revival structures, dominated by tall towers, and designed by Anton or his sons.

=== Stained glass windows ===
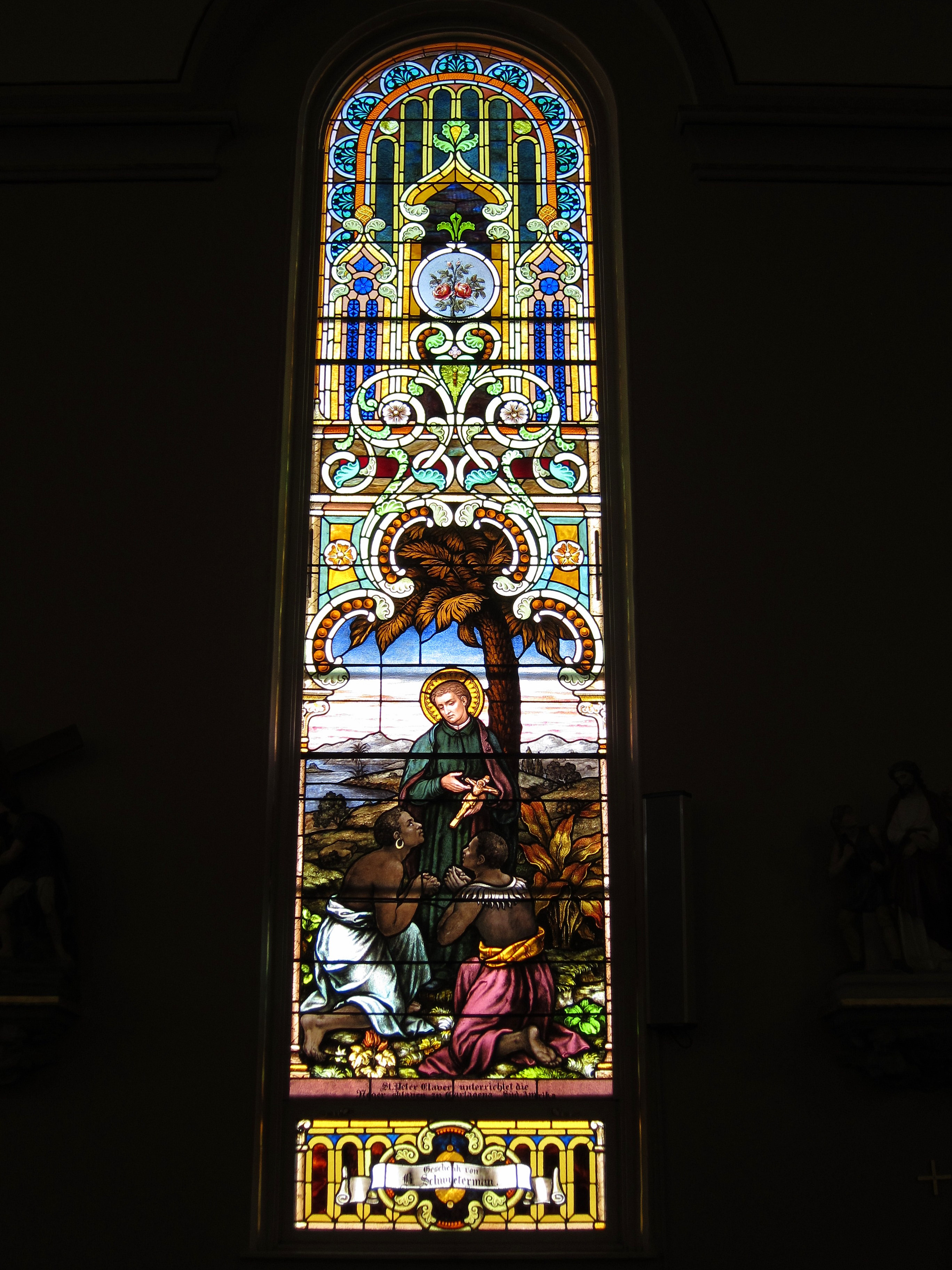
Stained glass window of St. Peter Claver

The church interior is adorned with Munich-style stained glass windows. The windows depict the life of the church patron saint, Aloysius Gonzaga, saints associated with other places having names similar to "Carthagena", and saints revered in German culture.

Subjects of the pictorial windows (as written on the windows, translated from German)

- St. Aloysius receives the first Holy Communion from the hand of St. Charles Borromeo.
- St. Aloysius is surprised by his parents in prayer.
- St. Florian, Soldier and Martyr, Patron against fire hazard.
- St. Isidore Archbishop of Seville, 636. Born 560 in Cartagena, Spain.
- St. Notburga Virgin and Maid Servant. Died 1313.
- St. Perpetua, Mother and Martyr, 202 in Carthage, Africa.
- St. Peter Claver teaches the Negro slaves in Cartagena, South America.
- St. Deacon Lawrence hears of his approaching death from St. Pope Sixtus.

== Related properties ==
Two school buildings – one frame and one brick – were built approximately 0.5 miles (0.80 km) west of the church. These buildings were built for the Black community that lived in Carthagena before the current parish was in the area. In order to better serve the parish school, a house was erected for the nuns who taught there after they left the seminary building. Many parishes in the Archdiocese of Cincinnati constructed rectories for their pastors in accord with an archiepiscopal directive in the early twentieth century; however, this was not necessary for St. Aloysius Church, as its pastors always resided at the seminary. Moreover, two cemeteries are located in proximity to the church: the original Black cemetery, near U.S. Route 127 west of the church, and the parish cemetery, between the Black cemetery and the church.

== Recent history ==
=== Recognition ===
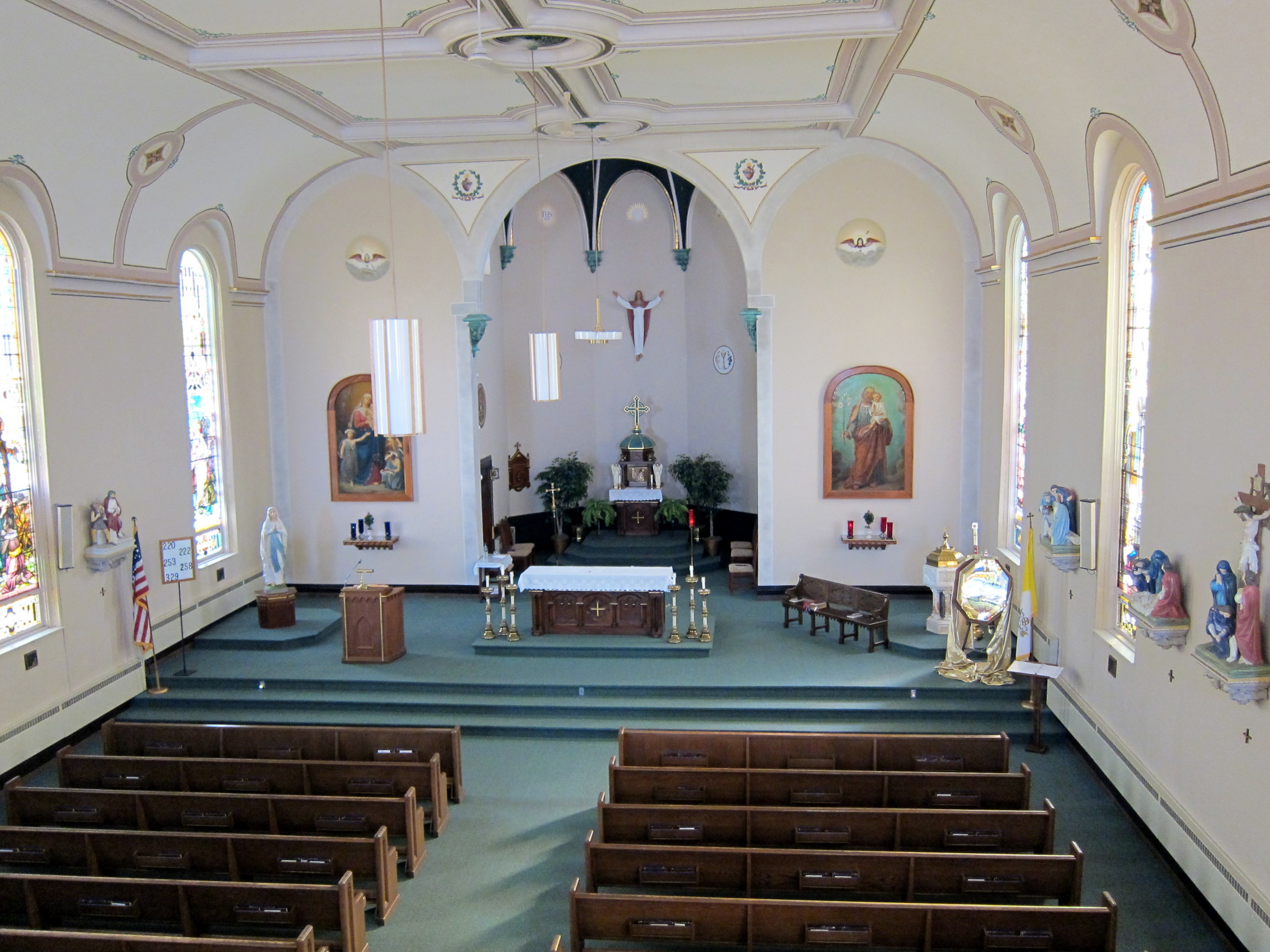
Church interior as viewed from the loft

Architectural historians from the Ohio Historical Society surveyed St. Aloysius Church in 1977 as part of a historic preservation effort known as the "Ohio Historic Inventory." This survey revealed that the church's interior was in good condition and its exterior in excellent condition; the only likely threats to its integrity were plans for continued interior remodelling. In recognition of its well-preserved architecture, the church was listed on the National Register of Historic Places in 1979. More than seventy other buildings at over thirty-five locations, including twenty-eight other churches, were listed on the Register at the same time as part of the "Cross-Tipped Churches Thematic Resources", a collection of architecturally significant buildings related to the Missionaries of the Precious Blood in far western Ohio. The tall Gothic Revival towers of the many Catholic churches of this region, pioneered by that of St. Aloysius Church, have become this region's namesake: it is known as the "Land of the Cross-Tipped Churches."

=== Current status ===
St. Aloysius Church continues as an active parish of the Archdiocese of Cincinnati to the present day. It is part of the St. Henry Cluster, along with St. Bernard Parish in Burkettsville, St. Francis Parish in Cranberry Prairie, St. Henry Parish in St. Henry, and St. Wendelin Parish in St. Wendelin. The entire cluster is a part of the St. Marys Deanery.
