= St. Joseph's Catholic Church (Egypt, Ohio) =

- Egypt Catholic Church and Rectory
- U.S. National Register of Historic Places
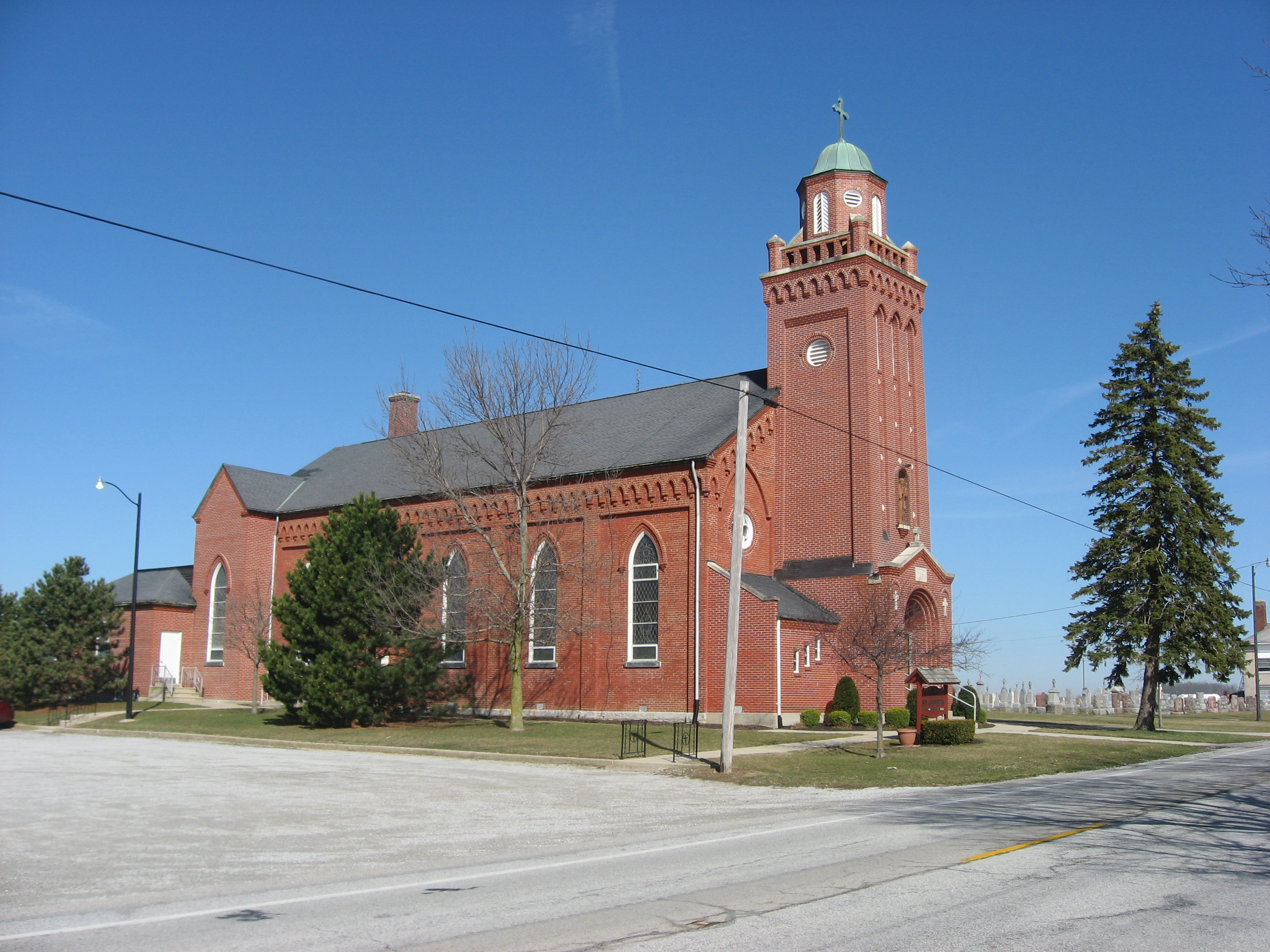
- Front and side of the church

- Location within Ohio Location within the United States
- Location: Junction of State Route 364 and Minster-Egypt Rd., Egypt, Ohio
- Coordinates: 40°23′5″N 84°26′4″W
- Area: less than one acre
- Built: 1887
- Architect: Anton Goehr
- Architectural style: Late Gothic Revival, Sears
- MPS: Cross-Tipped Churches of Ohio TR
- NRHP reference No.: 79003455
- Added to NRHP: July 26, 1979

St. Joseph's Catholic Church is a historic Roman Catholic church in Egypt, Ohio, United States. Built in 1887, this church is home to a small Catholic parish, and it has been declared a historic site because of its well-preserved Gothic Revival architecture.

== Early history ==
The original settlers of far southern Auglaize County were overwhelmingly Catholic. At this period, prior to 1850, the region was part of the Great Black Swamp; consequently, travel was extremely difficult. An unsubstantiated claim by a former preacher of St. Josephs Catholic Church suggests that Egypt was named by German immigrants in the early-1830s after a settler described the swampy area back then as being “made by a dab of mud that fell from the wheelbarrow of God.” However, the town name is actually derived from the hometown of the mother of a couple of the earliest pioneers in the area. John Henry Osterloh immigrated from a town called Halter in Lower Saxony, Germany. He purchased a farm in what would later become Egypt in 1829 – 1830. His mother was from Aegypten in Lower Saxony, Germany. John Henry Osterloh died from a typhus epidemic in 1833. One of his brothers, John Albert Osterloh (1814 – 1901) arrived in 1834 at the age of 20, took over possession of John Henry's farm, & continued purchasing more land surrounding it. The residents got tired of traveling nearly 4 miles to the town of Minster to get to church, so they petitioned to get one in Egypt in 1852 & St. Josephs Catholic Church was subsequently built. John Albert Osterloh donated land for the church & adjoining cemetery. Egypt's first settlers were members of St. Augustine's Church in Minster, approximately 3 miles (4.8 km) to the east. Because of the swampy character of the land, wheeled transit was nearly impossible; the men of the community could only travel to St. Augustine's on horseback, and the women and children were almost never able to worship at all. At the same time, the membership of St. Augustine's was growing to the point that its facilities were severely strained. Therefore, a movement arose for the creation of a separate parish in Egypt, and in 1852, three men were sent to petition Archbishop Purcell for a separate church. The archbishop granted permission for the erection of the parish in that year; it was dedicated to St. Joseph, and subscriptions soon raised $800 for the construction of a church.

Once the members had agreed on the basic architectural elements of their church, they summoned multiple contractors for the bidding process. Each of the contractors independently named $800 as the cost of erecting the new church; consequently, parishioner Henry Rolfes was placed in charge after he named his price at just $300 and the cost of some materials. Even after the cost of all materials was deducted, enough money remained to pay a priest for the first year. Originally, the parish had no priest of its own; Mass was typically celebrated by priests from St. John's in Maria Stein or St. Augustine's in Minster. After four years, a rectory and a female convent were built near the church, and the parish obtained a resident pastor for the first time. Since its earliest years, St. Joseph's Church has been served by the Society of the Precious Blood.

== Architecture ==
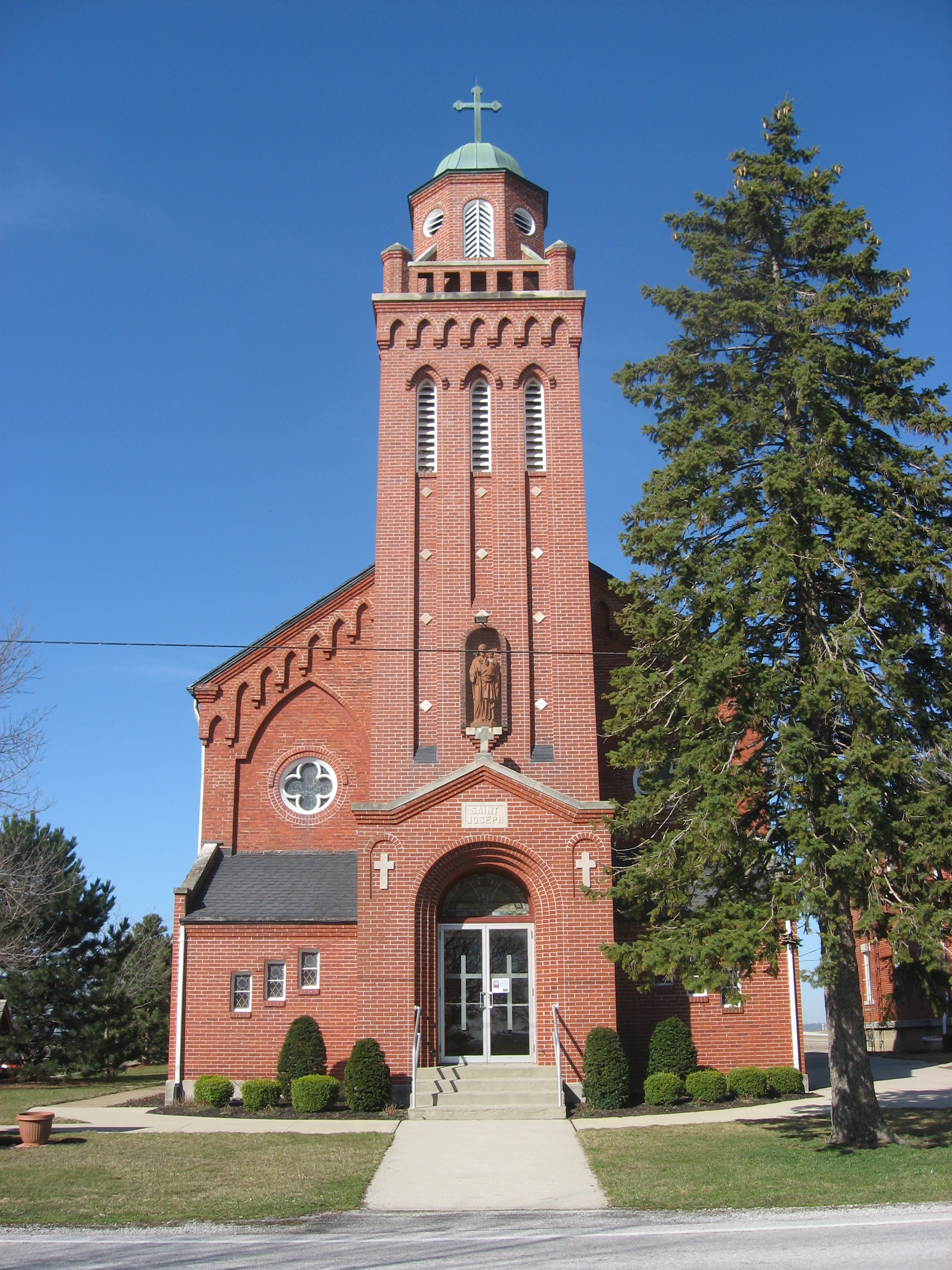
Front of the church

By the late 1880s, the original church building had become insufficient for the parish's needs. Under the leadership of their elderly priest, John van den Brock, the parish erected a new church in 1887 at a cost of $5,000, according to a design by Anton Goehr. This building's walls are built of brick, supported by a stone foundation with a basement and topped with a gabled roof of asphalt. Its floor plan is the shape of a Latin cross, three bays wide and six bays long, and the entire building reflects the Gothic Revival style of architecture. Inside, the church is ornamented with frescoes on the walls and a heavily decorated ceiling, and the altars are built in a revivalistic form of the Gothic style. Worshippers enter the church through an arched doorway in the base of the tower.

Goehr's design remained little changed until 1927, when the church was modified by the addition of a tower and a sacristy. Although the sacristy remains in place, the tower was further modified in the 1940s by the replacement of its spire with a small domed belfry.

== Related buildings ==
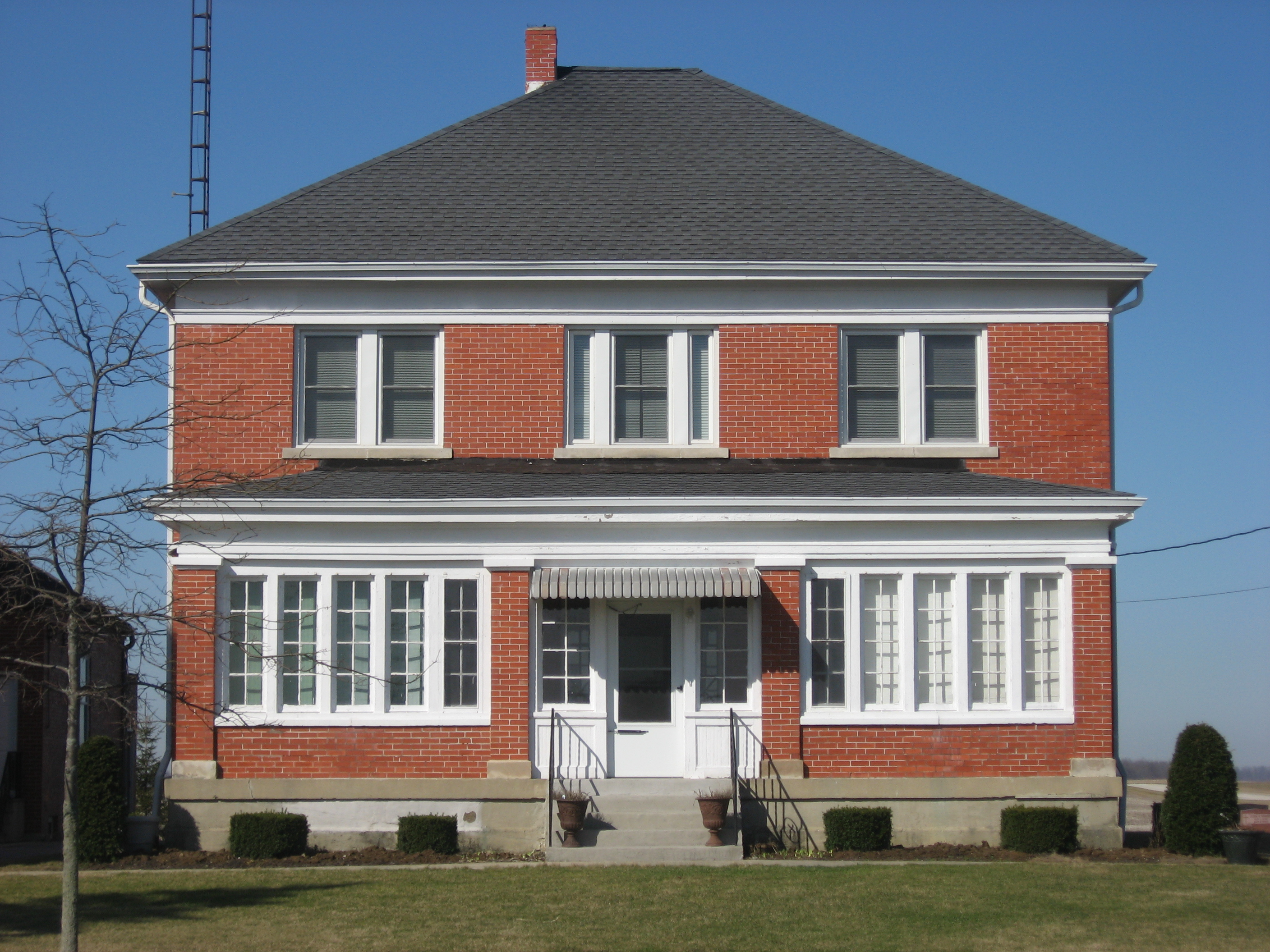
Front of the rectory

Located immediately to the north of the church is a rectory. After the male and female members of the Missionaries of the Precious Blood became two separate organizations, the male organization donated all of its Egypt properties to the female organization, leaving St. Joseph's Church without a rectory. When a replacement rectory was completed in 1912, it had cost $6,000 plus extensive labor on the part of the parishioners. The resulting structure is a two-and-a-half story square brick structure, built on a stone foundation and topped with an asphalt hip roof with a dormer window. Many other Catholic churches in the Archdiocese of Cincinnati built rectories around this time, due to a directive from the archbishop; like the one at Egypt, they are typically square brick houses with wrap-around porches. These buildings typically resemble the style of houses purchased through the Sears Roebuck catalogues of the period.

Immediately to the north of the rectory is a parish cemetery, and slightly farther to the north is a former parish school. Located along the road between Minster and Maria Stein, more than two miles to the northwest, is part of the abandoned 1856 convent. Once three stories high, it has been reduced to one story, and its brick walls have been covered with modern siding.

== Recent history ==
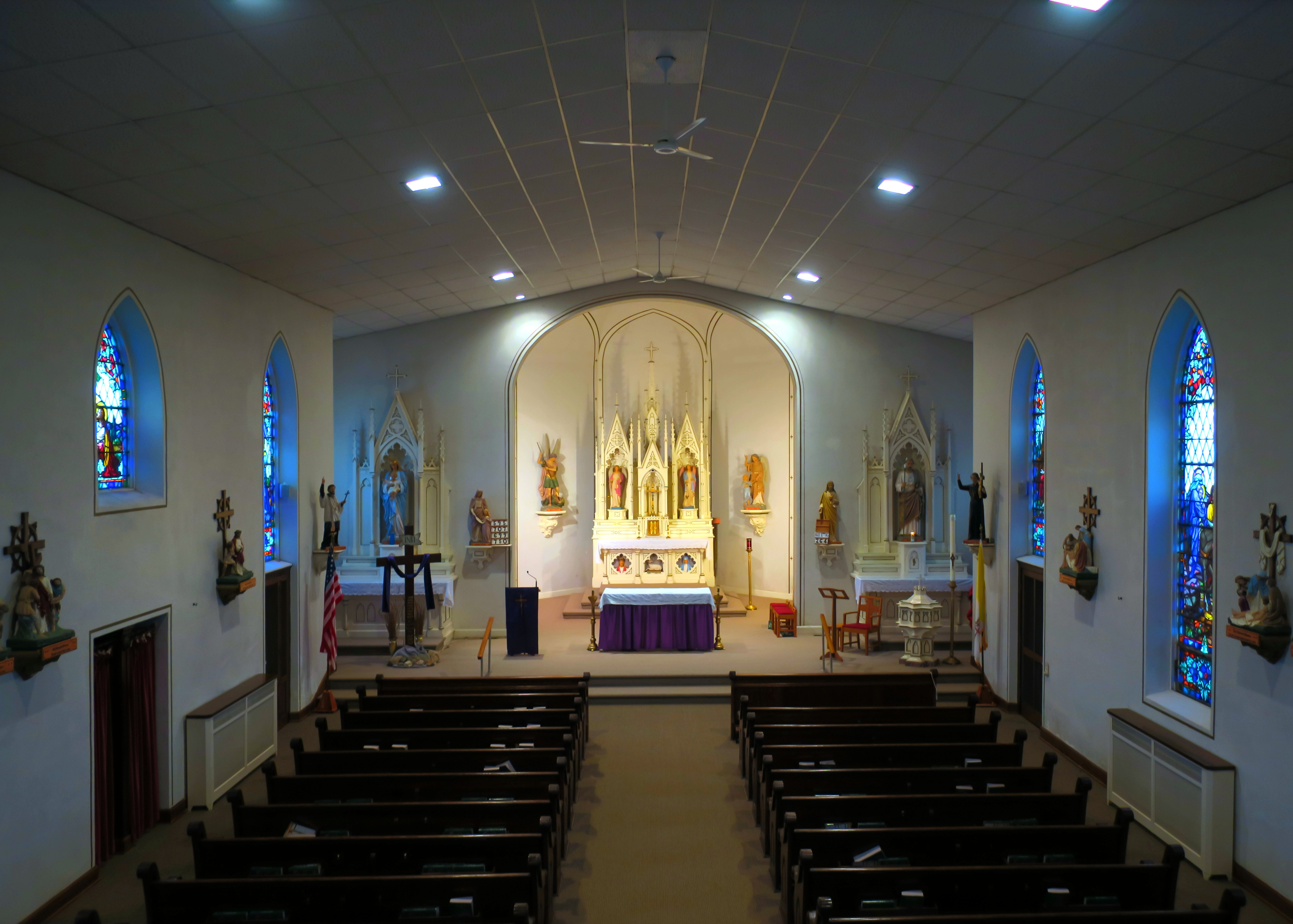
Interior

In 1977, St. Joseph's Church and its rectory were recorded by the Ohio Historic Inventory, a historic preservation program of the Ohio Historical Society. Both buildings were found to be in good condition, but both were seen as endangered by the weak state of the parish that owned them. St. Joseph's Church was one of the smallest parishes in the Archdiocese of Cincinnati, and priest shortages in the American Catholic Church meant that small parishes such as St. Joseph's were not likely to be able to have their own pastors; consequently, it was believed that the church would close by 1982. Eventually, this plan was cancelled; St. Joseph's Church is still an active parish of the Archdiocese of Cincinnati. It is clustered with St. Augustine's Church in Minster and served by the same priest, and the cluster is part of the St. Marys Deanery.

Although it was seen as doomed to closure, St. Joseph's Church was listed on the National Register of Historic Places in 1979 because of its well-preserved historic architecture; the rectory was also included in the nomination. These buildings were part of a collection of nearly thirty churches and various other church-related buildings, designated the "Cross-Tipped Churches Thematic Resources," a multiple property submission of properties in western Ohio related to the Missionaries of the Precious Blood. Architectural historians have divided these churches into four generations; St. Joseph's is a member of the second generation, which are generally simple rectangular brick buildings without tall spires. Many churches from this generation, such as St. Joseph's and St. Anthony's in Padua, were later expanded by the addition of a single tower at the front of the building, due to the prevalence of such towers at the construction of newer churches. Few churches from before this period survive; only St. John's in Fryburg to the northwest and St. Augustine's in Minster remain churches, and St. Augustine's has been greatly modified by the addition of twin towers. Because most churches in this region are tall Gothic Revival structures with large towers, the region has become known as the "Land of the Cross-Tipped Churches."

== Notes ==
a: The subscription process consisted of gathering pledges to pay money toward a stated goal; in this instance, the members of the church signed up to provide specific amounts of money for the construction of the church.
