= Immaculate Conception Catholic Church (Celina, Ohio) =

- Immaculate Conception Catholic Church Complex
- U.S. National Register of Historic Places
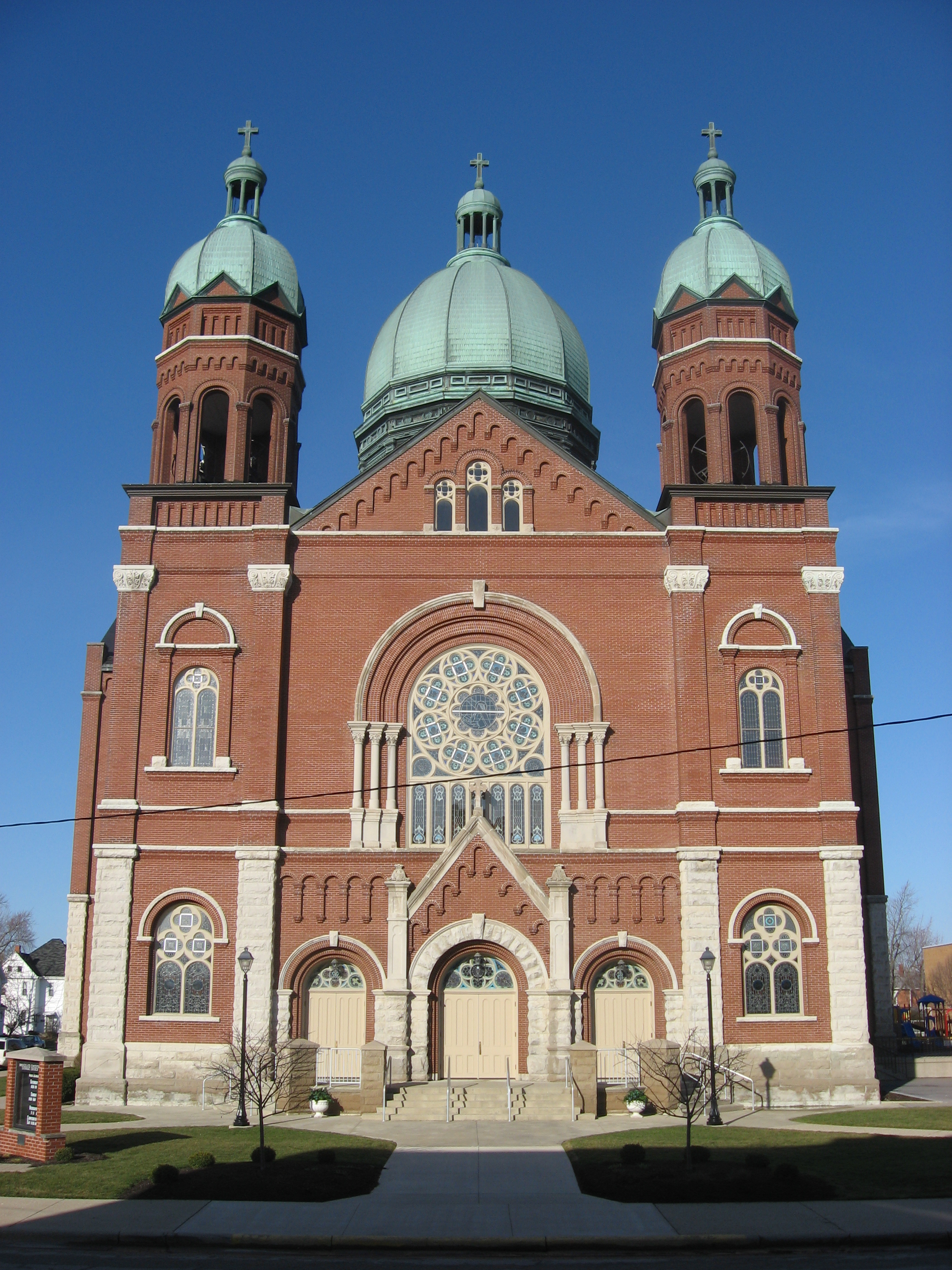
- Front of the church

- Location within Ohio Location within the United States
- Location: Anthony and Walnut Sts., Celina, Ohio
- Coordinates: 40°33′7″N 84°34′22″W
- Area: 3 acres (1.2 ha)
- Built: 1903
- Architect: Andrew DeCurtins; John Burkhart
- Architectural style: Romanesque Revival, English Perpendicular
- MPS: Cross-Tipped Churches of Ohio TR
- NRHP reference No.: 79002833
- Added to NRHP: July 26, 1979

Immaculate Conception Catholic Church is a parish of the Roman Catholic Church in Celina, Ohio, United States. Founded later than many other Catholic parishes in the heavily Catholic region of western Ohio, it owns a complex of buildings constructed in the early 20th century that have been designated historic sites because of their architecture. Leading among them is its massive church, built in the Romanesque Revival style just 43 years after the first Catholic moved into the city: it has been called northwestern Ohio's grandest church building.

== Parish history ==
Catholics were active in southern Mercer County by the 1830s; St. John the Baptist parish in Maria Stein and St. Rose parish in St. Rose were established in 1837, and St. Henry parish in St. Henry and St. Joseph parish in St. Joe were also founded before 1840. Despite the growing Catholic presence to the south, the county seat was strongly Protestant in its early history: when it was platted in 1834, the proprietors donated lots for the use of congregations of the Baptist, Methodist, and Presbyterian faiths, and not a single Catholic was resident in the village for more than a quarter of a century. Beginning with Owen Gallagher in 1860, Catholics began to migrate into Celina, and starting in 1864, Mass was celebrated biweekly in a factory owned by one of the members. At this time, no priest lived in Celina; the celebrant was typically Joseph Gregory Dwenger, then the pastor of Holy Rosary parish in nearby St. Marys. A parish was formally erected in Celina in 1864 and dedicated to the Immaculate Conception.

With the creation of the parish, more Catholics were attracted to Celina; the parish grew to the point that a church building was needed, and the Archbishop of Cincinnati, John Baptist Purcell, came to Celina to lay the cornerstone on August 3, 1864. Members subscribed to the building fund throughout that year and the following; it was completed in November 1865, and Joseph Dwenger dedicated it on December 8, 1865. This building was a brick structure, measuring approximately 40 feet (12 m) by 60 feet (18 m); it cost $7,000 to build. However, the parish continued to grow, and a building fund for a new edifice was started in 1899. Construction of the replacement church building began in the following year, and it was dedicated in 1903 at a cost of $52,000. In the early twentieth century, it was widely considered the finest church building in all of northwestern Ohio, and decades later, its architecture still dominates all of downtown Celina.

Since the parish's earliest years, members of the Missionaries of the Precious Blood have provided pastoral care for the members; Dwenger was a member of this society, as were the other five priests who served there in its first decade. The first priest to live in Celina was Theopistus Wittmer, who arrived in 1876; the members acquired a small frame house to use as a rectory. Soon after Wittmer's arrival, the parish constructed a building for their parochial school. The structure built for this school was two stories tall and measured approximately 40 feet (12 m) by 36 feet (11 m); it replaced a frame building in which the school had started in 1871. A convent was built in 1879 to house the first of the Sisters of the Precious Blood, who came in that year to teach at the parish school; it was replaced by a larger structure in 1949, located northeast of the rest of the buildings related to the parish.

Today, Immaculate Conception continues to be an active parish in the Archdiocese of Cincinnati. It is clustered with Our Lady of Guadalupe parish in Montezuma and St. Theresa, Little Flower of Jesus parish in Rockford; all three churches are part of the St. Marys Deanery.

== Buildings ==
=== Church ===
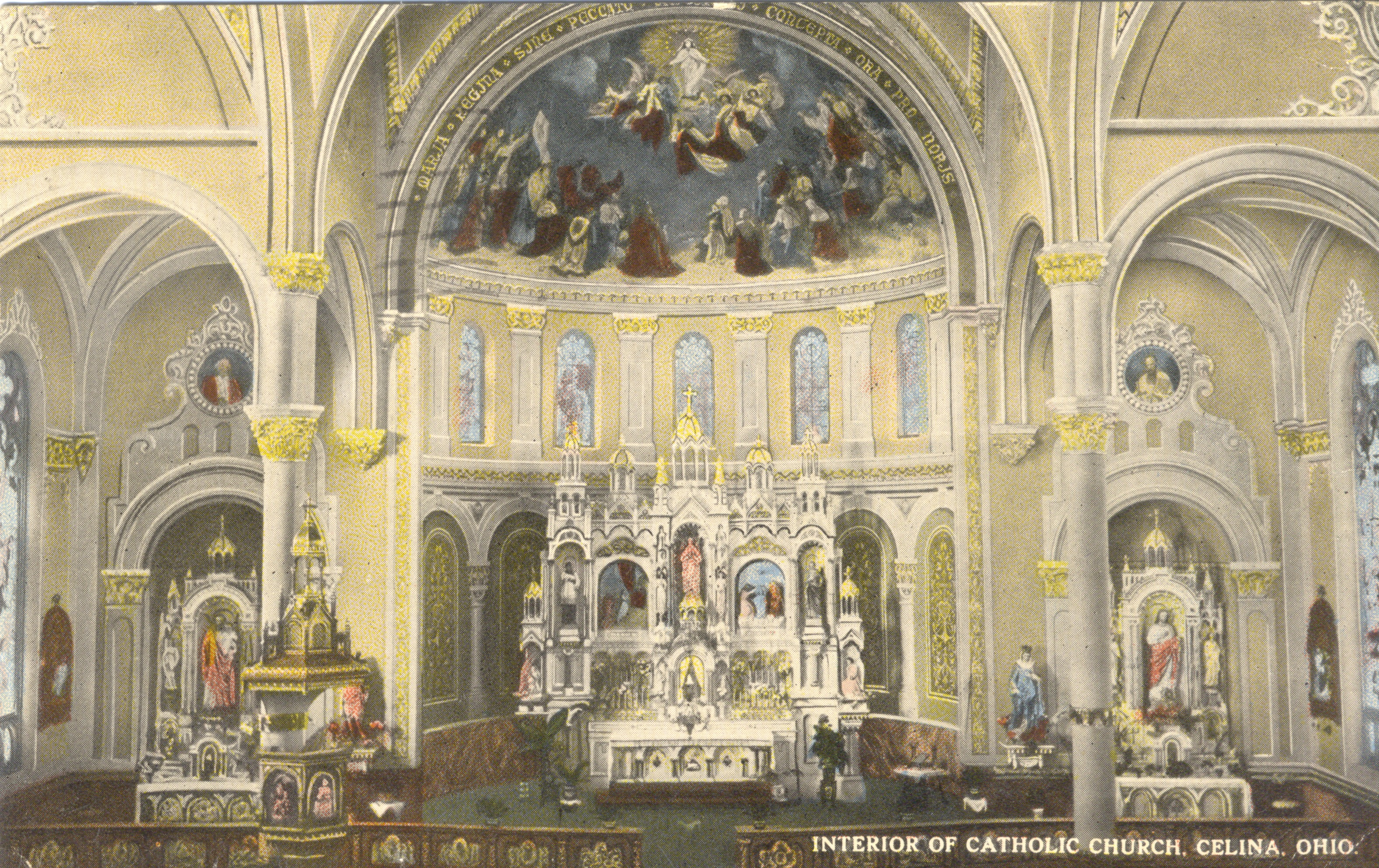
Interior circa 1910

The church itself is a large brick building constructed in the shape of a Greek cross; it was designed by Andrew DeCurtins of Lima and built under the supervision of John Burkhart of Kenton. A Romanesque Revival structure erected in 1903, it is centered on a large bronze dome. Worshippers may enter the building through its eastern end; the facade is pierced by three large doorways and a massive rose window. Capping the facade are two square towers; each one includes an octagonal belfry and is topped with a smaller bronze dome. Inside, the church is heavily decorated; many of the walls feature paintings, and the altar is distinctly Romanesque in its style. The entire building rests on a stone foundation with a basement.

Architectural historians have grouped the Precious Blood-related churches of far western Ohio into four different generations: the first, composed primarily of small log buildings from the first years of settlement until 1865; the second, composed of moderately sized brick churches built between 1865 and 1885; the third, composed mostly of large High Gothic Revival churches with massive towers constructed from 1885 to 1905; and the fourth, composed of churches built between 1905 and 1925 in a wide range of styles. Immaculate Conception's place at the end of the third generation is significant: its Romanesque Revival style is atypical of that period and much more common in the fourth generation that would soon arise, putting it in somewhat of a transitional place between the third and fourth generations.

=== Rectory ===
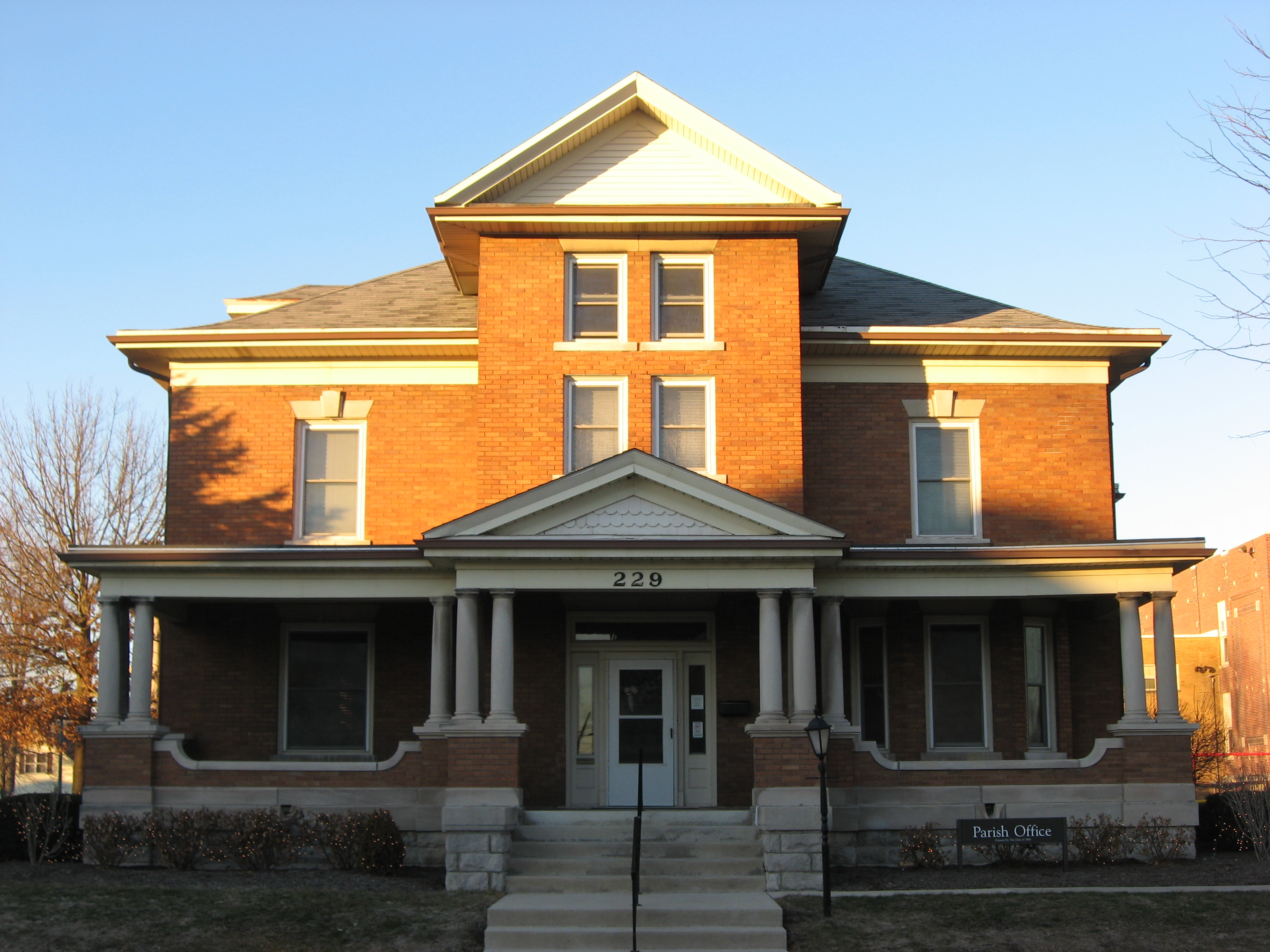
Front of the rectory

Located immediately west of the church, the Immaculate Conception rectory is a large square three-story brick house. It is the third residence to serve as the parish's rectory: members bought a frame house near the church in 1876, and after a new school building was completed in 1889, the priest moved into the old school. In 1908, the parish spent $2,000 to buy land from John Schlosser immediately west of the church; on this land they built the present rectory for $10,000. Divided into three bays on the front and six bays on each side, it sits on a foundation of cut stone with a stone water table and a basement. Individuals may enter through a large entryway on the southern front of the house or through a smaller doorway on the rear of the eastern side of the house.

Dominating the appearance of the house from the street is a large verandah-style porch, supported by large stone columns, on the southern-facing front of the house; an enclosed porch, smaller but two stories high and supported by wooden pillars, is located on the rear portion of the house's east side. Projecting from the front of the house, above the porch, is a small wing with a gable, semicircular window, and elaborate cornice. The house is built in a combination of styles; it includes many Italianate details, but its design appears to have been influenced by the architecture of the Sears Modern Homes.

=== Elementary school ===
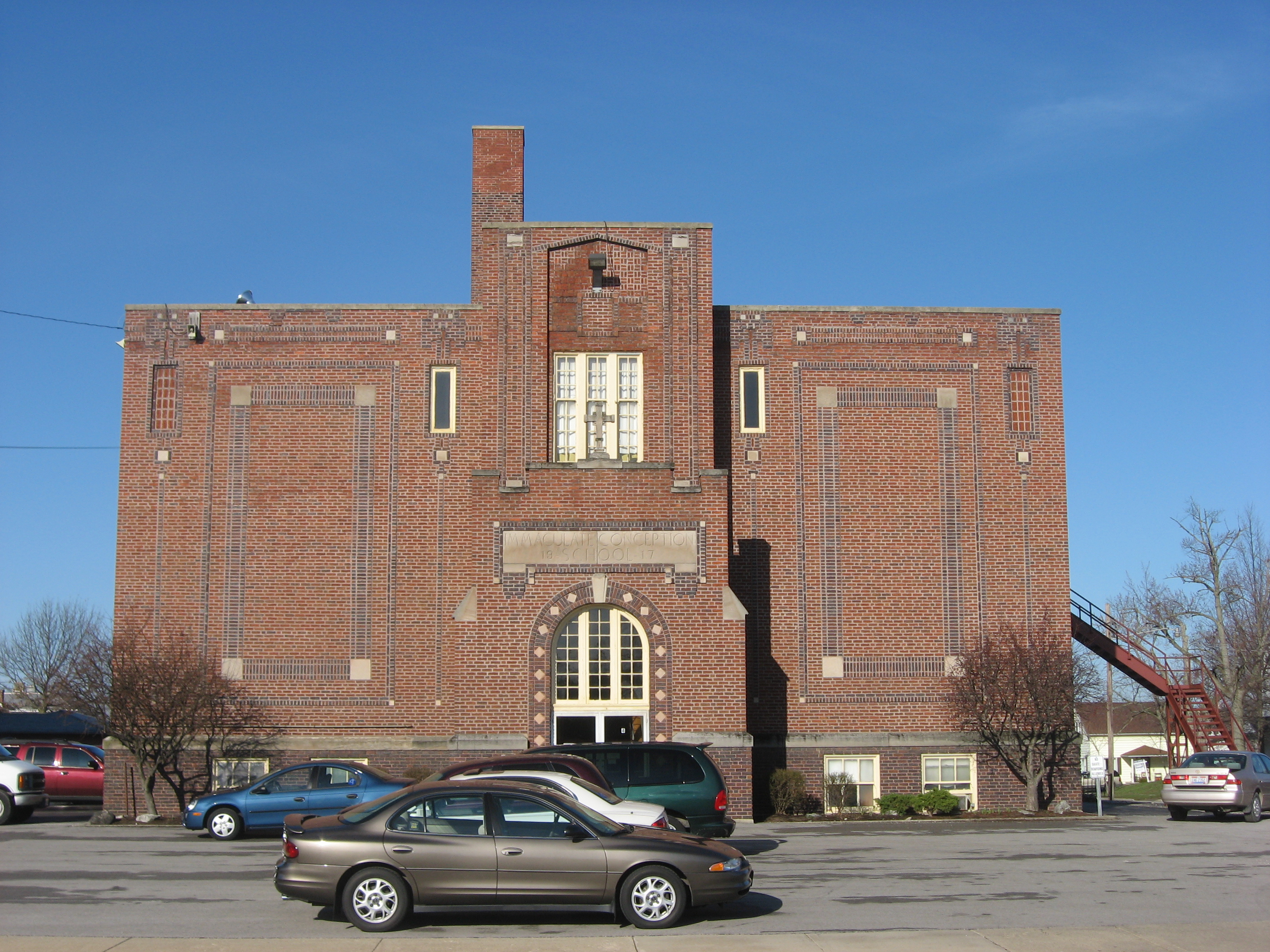
The school in the morning

Sitting immediately north of the church is the Immaculate Conception Elementary School, which was erected in 1918 at a cost of $70,000. Two stories tall and built of brick with a flat asphalt roof, it is divided into sixteen bays on each of its two sides. Among its leading architectural features are a central projection on its eastern front, the arched doorway in that projection, and ornamental panels around the entrance. The school occupies the site of an earlier school that was built in 1889; the present building was constructed because the previous structure had become too small. In its early years, the present building housed both the elementary school and the high school, which was only a three-year course for its first ten years. Because of continued growth in the high school, a new building was constructed specifically for it on the opposite side of the street. The architect for the elementary school was an unknown member of the DeCurtins family, who was related to the designer of the church building, Andrew DeCurtins. Unlike the newer building, the old elementary school remains a functioning school building. Due to falling enrollment and increasing expenses, the school was losing significant amounts of money by the late 2000s. Operating the school cost $874,243 in the 2008-2009 school year, while income was only $375,459. In 2010, the church announced that it would close the school at the end of the 2010-2011 school year unless finances improved markedly.

=== High school ===
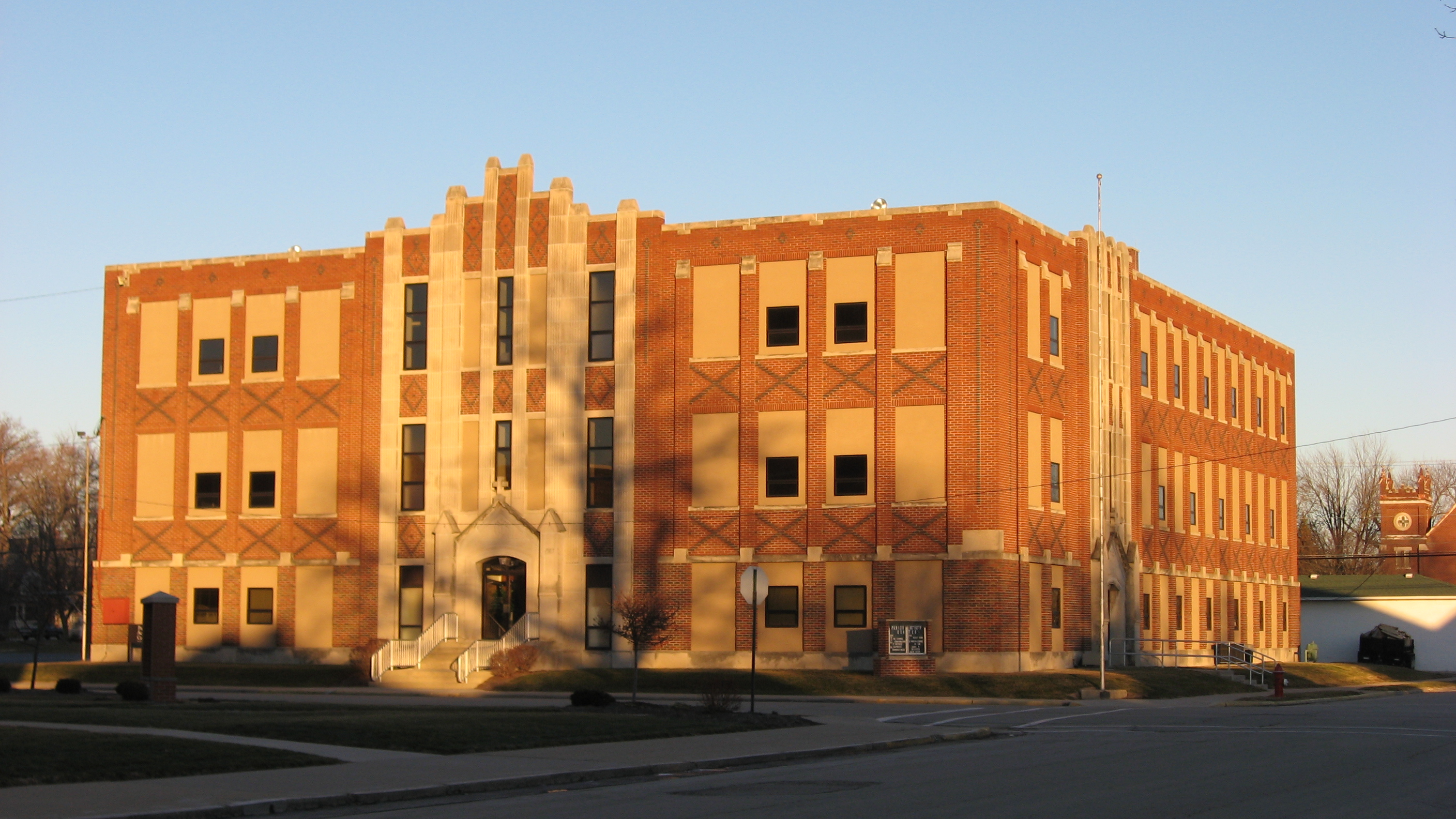
Front of the former high school

Located on the eastern side of Walnut Street across from the other buildings of the church complex, the former Immaculate Conception High School was built in 1933 under the supervision of William and Joseph Forsthoff. The building was designed by Fred DeCurtins, a relative of the architect who designed the church building, and the nephew of the architect who designed the elementary school. Members of the DeCurtins family, who lived primarily in the community of Carthagena, designed many churches and other religious buildings in Mercer County and the surrounding region, including the area's first church built with a tall tower, St. Aloysius' Church in Carthagena. Although Fred DeCurtins designed the church building constructed in 1937 for the new parish in the northern Mercer County village of Rockford, architectural historians believe that Immaculate Conception High School was the last building designed by the DeCurtins family for an entity connected to the Missionaries of the Precious Blood. The school closed at the end of the 1972 school year, and by the late 1970s, the parish no longer needed its high school building; although it remained in church ownership, it was leased for use by the Celina City School District for use as a ninth-grade academy.

Three stories tall, the high school is a brick and stone building constructed on a concrete foundation with a basement and topped with a flat composite roof. Its overall shape is that of a square, divided into thirteen bays on the front and sixteen bays on the sides. The first floor of its west-facing main facade is pierced by the large main entrance, which features an arched entrance with a cross-tipped stone gable at the top. A similar entrance is present on the building's southern side. Among its most prominent architectural features are eight stone columns on the main facade, which bracket groups of five windows on each story. These columns rise to different heights, creating a distinctive vertical effect. Such a style is common among more conservative modernist architects, who wish to combine older designs with current trends: historic elements are simplified and given a modernist style.

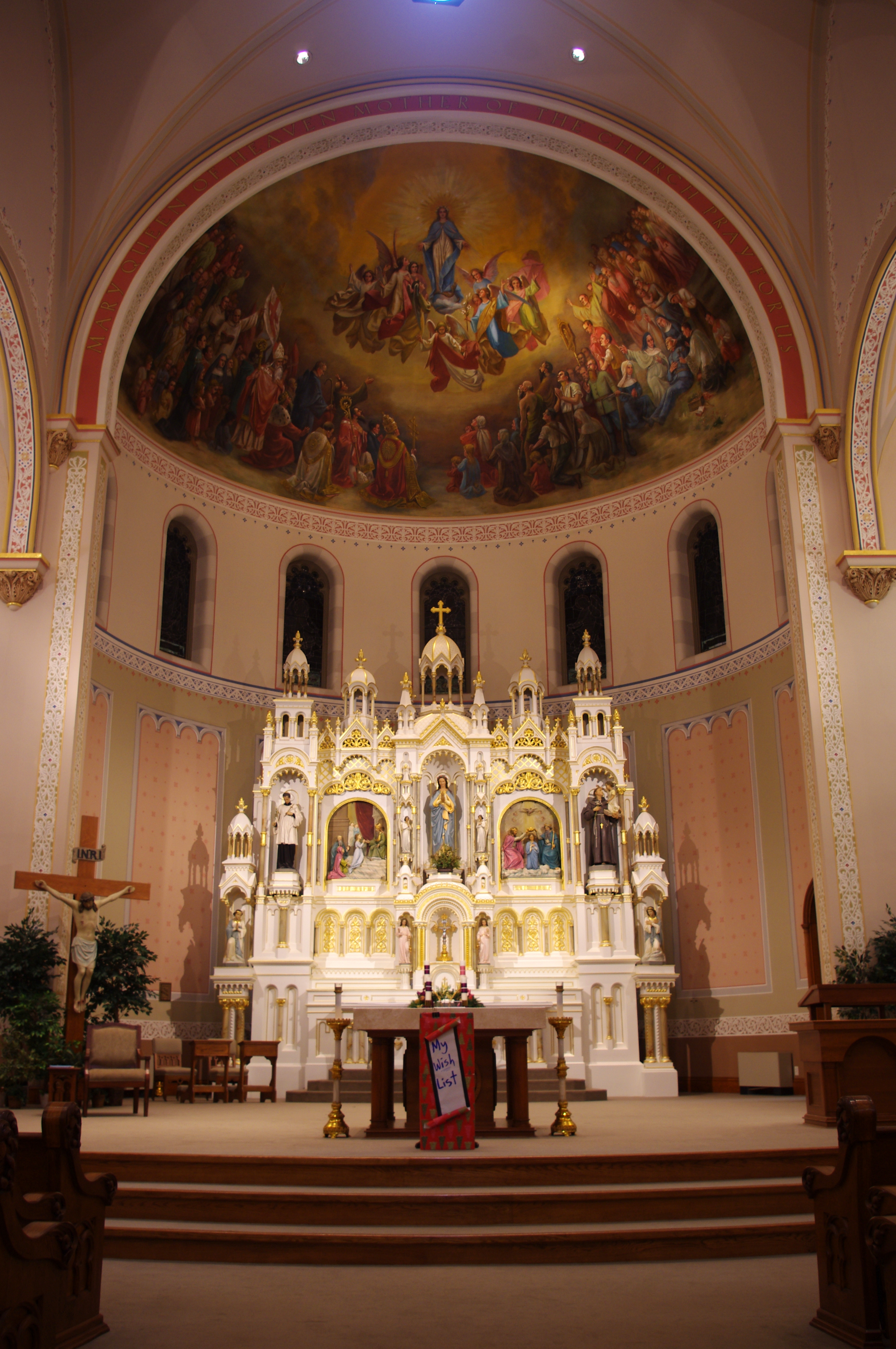
The church chancel and apse

== Recognition ==
In 1977, the church, rectory, and schools were recorded by a historic preservation program run by the Ohio Historical Society, known as the Ohio Historic Inventory. This survey found the church in excellent condition, the elementary school in fair condition, and the high school and rectory in good condition. Although no historic preservation program was in effect, no threats to historic integrity were identified for any of the buildings, except for the elementary school, which was deemed to be in danger from being outdated.

Two years later, the complex was listed on the National Register of Historic Places because of the well-preserved and historically significant architecture of its buildings. At the same time, the same designation was given to more than thirty other churches and other buildings in far western Ohio that were related to the Missionaries of the Precious Blood, using the multiple property submission process. Centered on the community of Maria Stein, the location of the Convent of Mary, Help of Christians, this predominately Catholic region is dotted with many large Romanesque Revival or Gothic Revival churches whose tall spires rise above tiny communities and can be seen from miles around. Because of the way that these churches dominate the region, the area has become known as the "Land of the Cross-Tipped Churches."
