= Invincible Grays =

African American military unit

The Gray Invincibles were a "colored unit" of the Pennsylvania Militia.

== History ==
The group of soldiers were organized by T. Morgan Jones who escaped slavery in Virginia as a teen. He made it to Monongahela in 1855 and worked on steamships. The unit's service in the American Civil War was initially rejected by governor Andrew Curtin "who said they were not needed, nor would they be accepted." The group volunteered a second time after the Emancipation Proclamation and Battle of Gettysburg and served in Virginia and South Carolina. Samuel Beecher Hart served as a captain with the Grays and went on to become a state legislator and proposed successful legislation for a monument commemorating the service of Pennsylvania's African American soldiers, the All Wars Memorial to Colored Soldiers and Sailors.

The Pennsylvania Militia was renamed the Pennsylvania National Guard in 1870. The unit was succeeded by the Keystone Guards and Company F, 10th Regiment, Eighth Division. It served as an honor guard at the 1876 U.S. centennial celebration in Philadelphia and during the railroad strikes of 1877. A plaque was presented to the Washington County, Pennsylvania commissioners in 2018 commemorating the unit's service.

Mark Hilton served as its First Lieutenant before resigning. Second Lt. William H. Jones succeeded him and was promoted to first lieutenant. Sgt. Joseph R. Griffey, identified by a local historian as an ancestor of former Major League Baseball players Ken Griffey Sr. and Ken Griffey Jr., was elected second lieutenant. A. Oscar Jones commanded in 1876. In 1889 Charles A. Hallstock captained the unit. It was described as "independent". In 1896 Andrew F. Stevens Jr. was its commander.
