= St. Augustine's Catholic Church (Minster, Ohio) =

- St. Augustine Catholic Church
- U.S. National Register of Historic Places
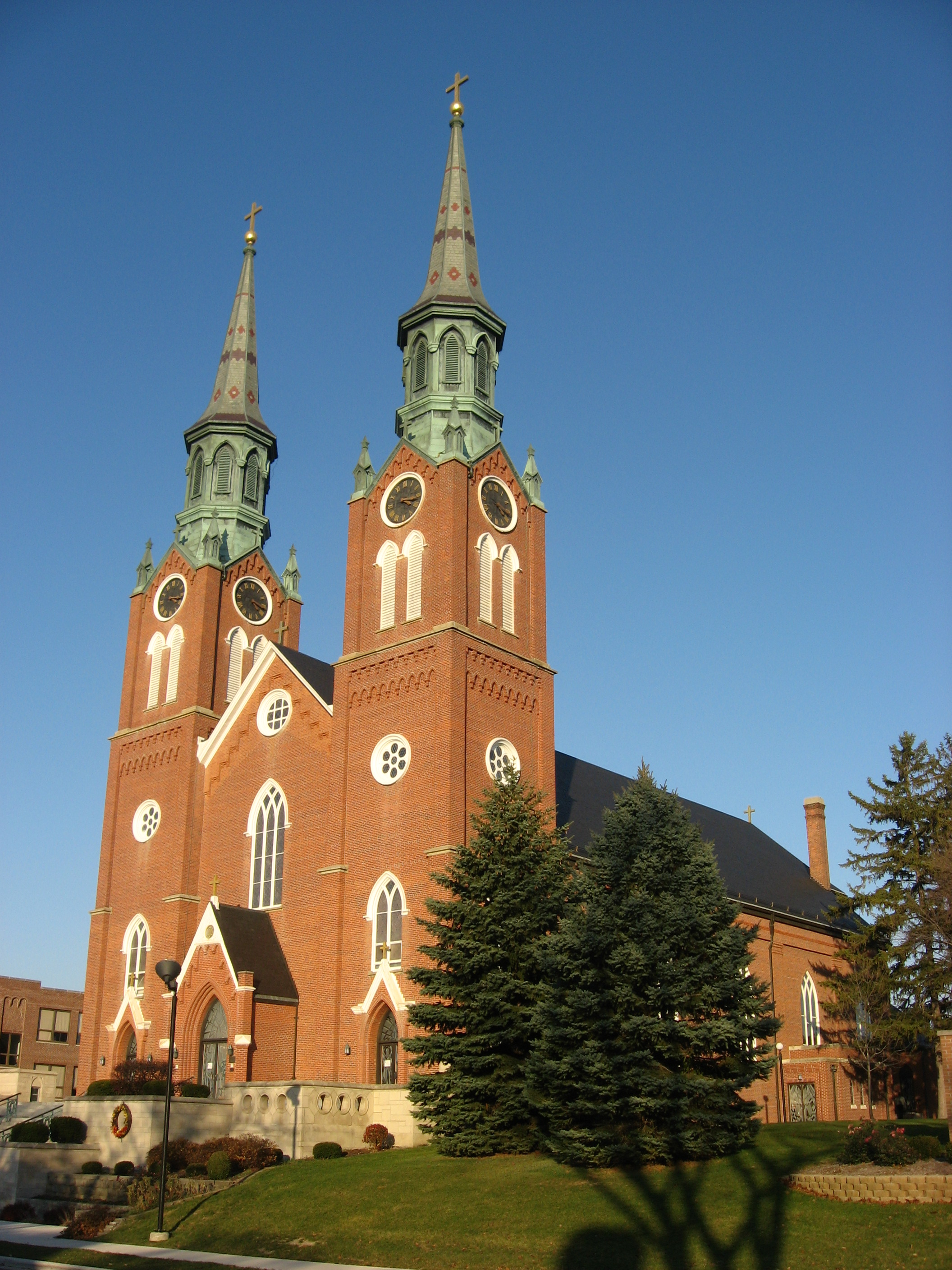
- Exterior of the church

- Location within Ohio Location within the United States
- Location: N. Hanover St., Minster, Ohio
- Coordinates: 40°23′40″N 84°22′47″W
- Area: Less than 1 acre (0.40 ha)
- Built: 1848
- Architect: Anton Goehr
- Architectural style: Gothic Revival
- MPS: Cross-Tipped Churches of Ohio TR
- NRHP reference No.: 79003457
- Added to NRHP: July 26, 1979

St. Augustine's Catholic Church is a historic Gothic Revival-style Roman Catholic church building located on North Hanover Street in Minster, Ohio, United States. Located in the region of western Ohio known as the "Land of the Cross-Tipped Churches," the church was built in 1848. In 1874, the building was modified with the construction of twin Gothic spires designed by Anton Goehr.

Beginning in the middle of the nineteenth century, St. Augustine was one of the three mother churches for the Society of the Precious Blood that served the Catholics of the region; it kept this position until the end of the century, and it is the only one of the three yet remaining. While many other churches in the region were built in the middle of the nineteenth century, few remain today, and only St. Augustine and St. John's to the northeast are yet used as parish churches.

On July 26, 1979, the building was added to the National Register of Historic Places as part of the "Cross-Tipped Churches of Ohio" multiple property submission. Today, St. Augustine's and St. Joseph's Church in nearby Egypt constitute the Minster Cluster of the Archdiocese of Cincinnati.

== Interior ==
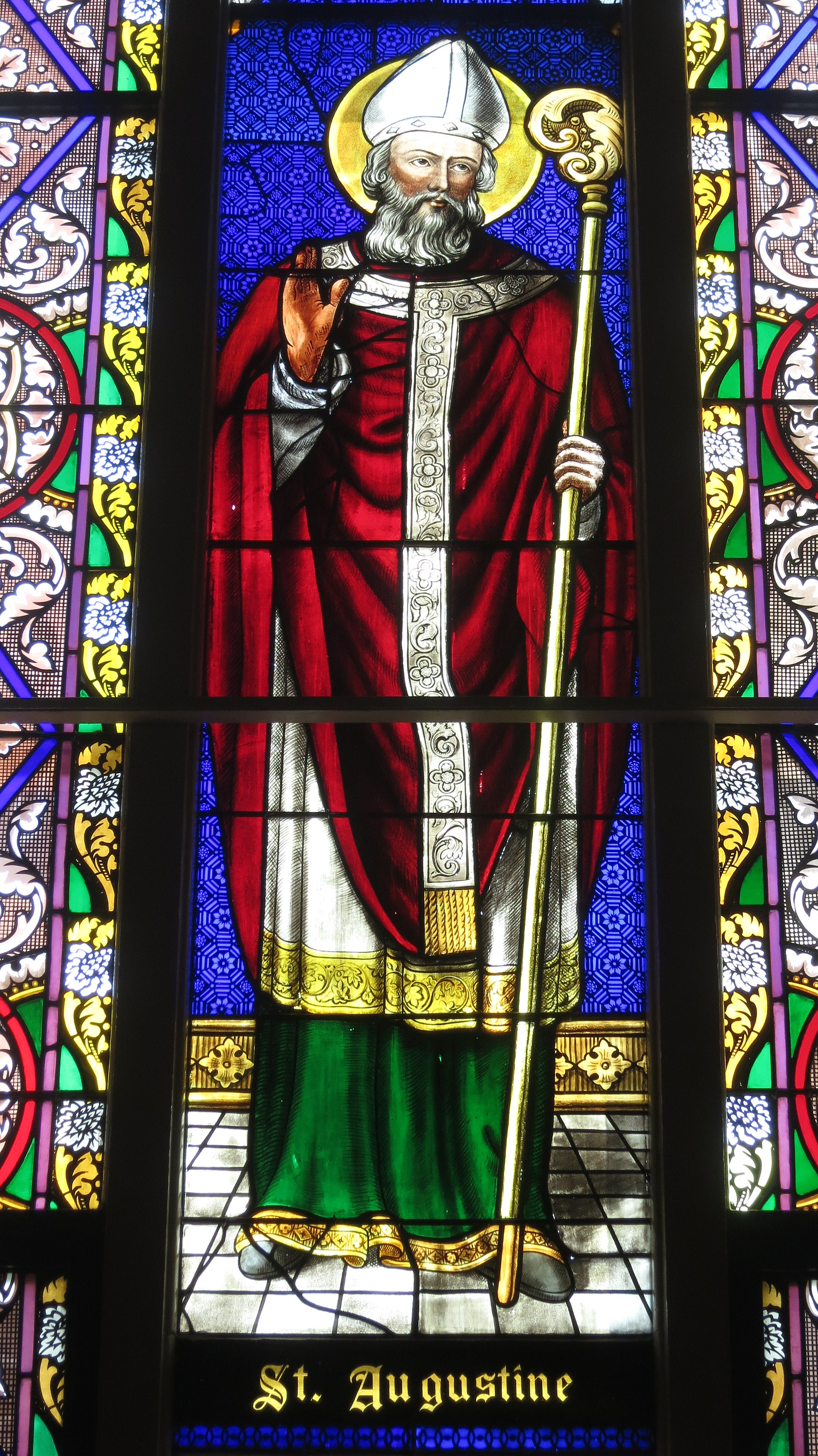
Stained glass window of St. Augustine

The church interior is adorned with stained windows depicting Christ and saints.

Subjects of the pictorial windows

- St. Augustine
- St. Gaspar del Bufalo
- St. John Bosco
- St. John the Evangelist
- St. Rose of Lima
- Jesus as the Good Shepherd

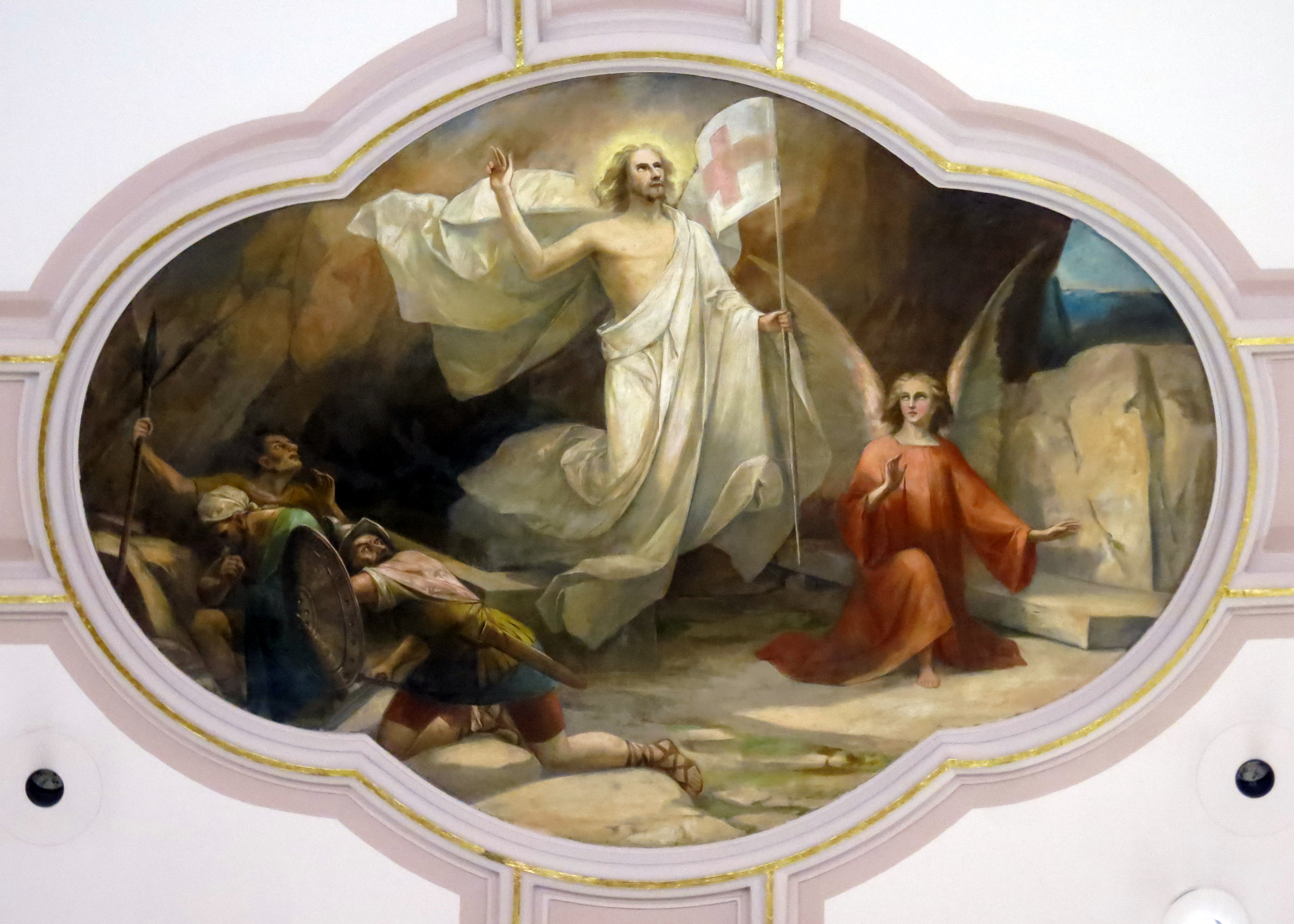
Ceiling fresco of the Resurrection of Jesus

The church ceiling is decorated with frescos depicting the life of Christ and a scene in Heaven.

Subjects of the ceiling frescos

- The Trinity and the Communion of Saints
- Adoration of the shepherds
- The Annunciation
- The Agony in the Garden
- The Crucifixion of Jesus
- The Entombment of Jesus
- The Resurrection of Jesus

== See also ==
- Steinemann Chapel
