= Emlen Institute =

Boarding school for minority children in United States

Emlen Institution for the Benefit of Children of African and Indian Descent was an agricultural and industrial boarding school for African American and Native American children in the United States. It was established in a bequest by Samuel Powers Emlen Jr., a prominent Quaker who lived in Burlington, New Jersey who died in 1837. Emlen left $20,000 for the "education, maintenance and instruction in school learning and in agriculture and mechanical trades or arts, of free male orphan children of African or Indian descent." It was established in Ohio with the acquisition of an existing manual labor school for African Americans in Carthagena, Ohio before relocating to Pennsylvania. It is unclear when it ceased operating. Several buildings from one of its locations in Pennsylvania are extant.

== History ==
Emlen's trustees in 1838 were Philip Physick, William Smith, Dr. H.L. Hodge, Daniel B. Smith, William White, Nathaniel Chauncey, Dr. Casper Morris and Dr. William Shippen. Emlen Institution succeeded a manual labor school for African Americans in Carthagena, Ohio run by Augustus Wattles and his wife Susan Perley Wattles. They sold their property to the trustees of Emlen's estate in 1841, and continued on as superintendents. Facing bigoted discrimination from Democrats, Wattles departed in 1857 the school property was sold. The boarding school relocated to Solebury, Pennsylvania where it remained until 1873 when it was relocated again to Warminster. Samuel Beecher Hart, captain of the "Gray Invincibles" and a state legislator who proposed successful legislation for a monument to Pennsylvania's African American soldiers was an alumnus.

In 1881 the Israel H. Johnson the secretary of its board of trustees wrote in support of transferring six Quapaw Nation students from the Emlen Institute to the Carlisle Indian School.

Haverford College has a collection of documents from the school in its Quaker collection. St. Charles Seminary purchased its property in Ohio.
