= Samuel Beecher Hart =

Pennsylvania legislator

Samuel Beecher Hart (1863 – March 24, 1936) was a state legislator in Pennsylvania. He served multiple terms.

In 1925 Hart, an African-American state legislator from Philadelphia, introduced a bill in the Pennsylvania House of Representatives to commission a monument honoring 150 years of service in the U.S. military by Pennsylvania African Americans. It was initially defeated but after being resubmitted the following session it passed in 1927. The All Wars Memorial to Colored Soldiers and Sailors was erected. Its location was remote after disputes but it was eventually relocated in 1994.

He was born in Philadelphia. He studied at Emlen Institute, a home for "colored boys" in Warminster, and Mrs. Lloyd’s Night School in Gloucestershire, England. He was captain of a "colored unit" of the Pennsylvania National Guard, the Gray Invincibles. He worked as an inspector with the Department of Health and Charities in Philadelphia for 14 years and was a clerk at John A. Sparks, Esq. for 10 years. He edited a newspaper and publications.

Hart was a Republican and was elected to the Pennsylvania House of Representatives in 1924 and was reelected for 5 consecutive terms. He died while still in office. He was buried at Eden Cemetery in Collingdale, Pennsylvania.
