= Wendelin, Ohio =

Unincorporated community in Ohio, U.S.

Coordinates: 40°23′57″N 84°41′24″W

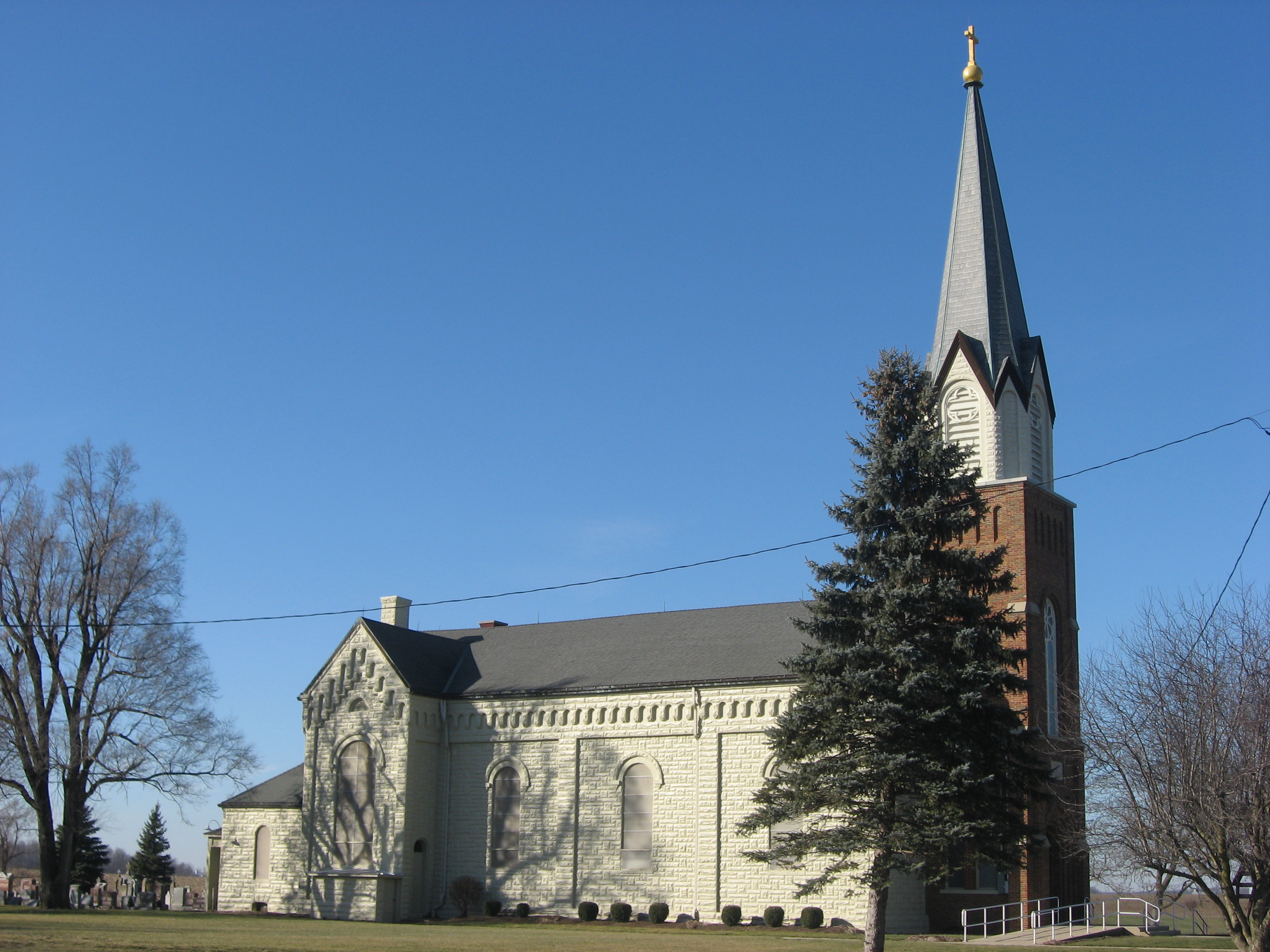
St. Wendelin's Catholic Church

Wendelin is an unincorporated community in Mercer County, in the U.S. state of Ohio.

== History ==
A post office called Wendelin was established in 1883, and remained in operation until 1904. Besides the post office, Wendelin has a Catholic church.
