= St. Charles Seminary =

- St. Charles Seminary and Chapel
- U.S. National Register of Historic Places
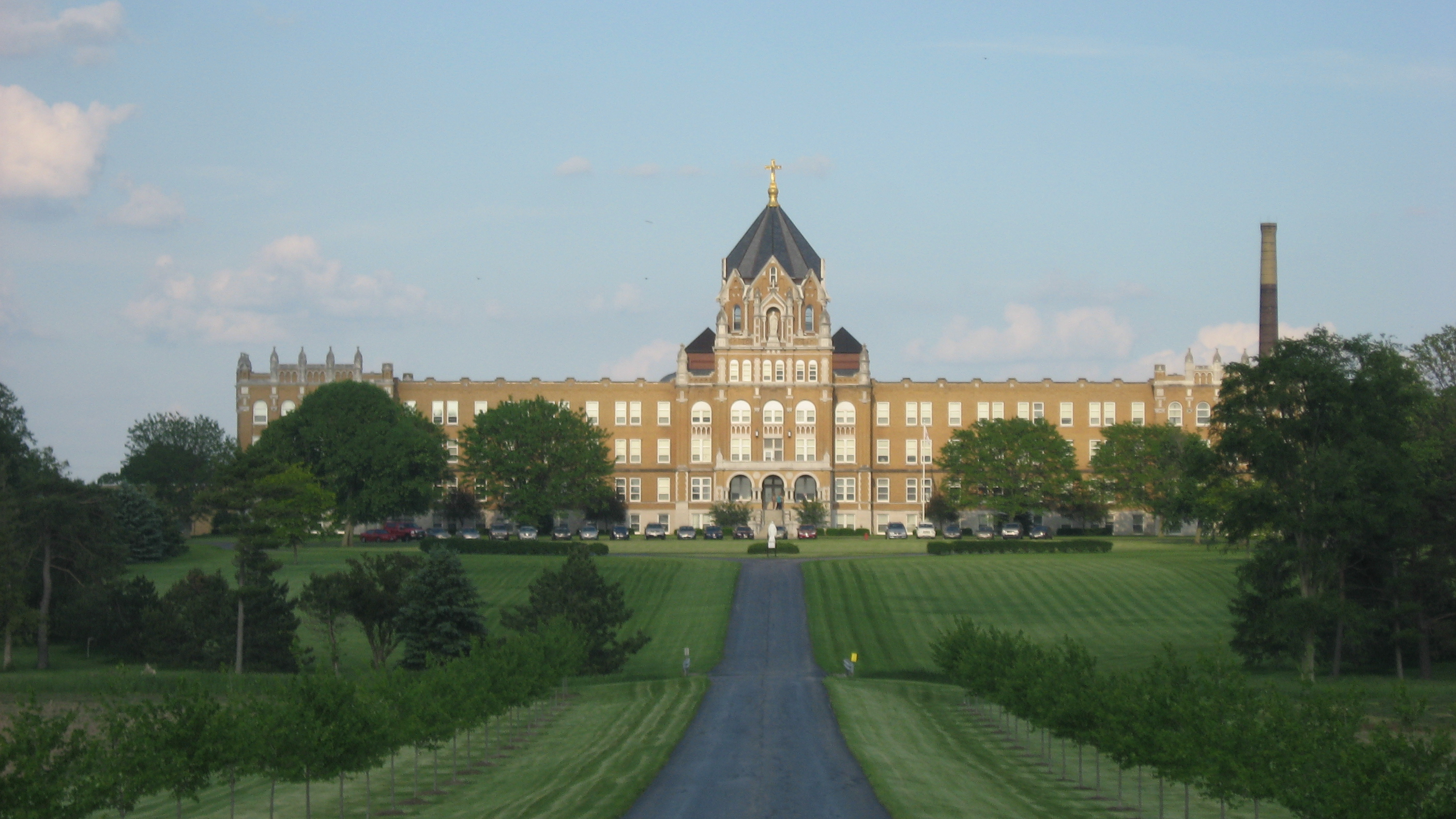
- The former Seminary in 2010

- Location within Ohio Location within the United States
- Nearest city: Carthagena, Ohio
- Coordinates: 40°25′57″N 84°33′48″W
- Area: 150 acres (61 ha)
- Built: 1906
- Architectural style: Gothic, Romanesque
- MPS: Cross-Tipped Churches of Ohio TR
- NRHP reference No.: 79002840
- Added to NRHP: July 26, 1979

St. Charles Seminary is a former American Catholic seminary, founded by the Missionaries of the Precious Blood in 1861 in Carthagena, Ohio. The seminary closed in 1969 and is now a retirement center for clergy and lay people. The seminary, chapel, and five other buildings were added to the National Register of Historic Places in 1979.

== History ==
The first buildings on the site of Saint Charles Seminary were the former buildings of the Emlen Institution, a boarding school for African-American and Native American youth funded from a bequest from Samuel Powers Emlen Jr., a Quaker. The institute sold its Ohio property and moved to Solebury in 1857.

The Missionaries of the Precious Blood had arrived in Ohio in 1844 to begin serving German-speaking settlers living there. In 1861 they purchased 200 acres of land and the former Emlen Institute to serve as a seminary for the candidates to their religious congregation, which they then placed under the patronage of St. Charles Borromeo.

The current seminary building was constructed over a six-year period in the 1920s. It is a three-story building with a 371-foot frontage, flanked by two 140-foot wings. The chapel was built by the sons of Ohio steepled-church designer Anton De Curtins. In 1941 David Ferrie, later to be accused of involvement in a plot to assassinate John F. Kennedy, enrolled in the seminary. He left in 1944 because of "emotional instability".

The seminary closed in 1969 as a consequence of declining enrollment. Theology students for the congregation now study at Catholic Theological Union in Chicago.

== Present day ==
In order to accommodate the retiring priests and Religious Brothers of the congregation, the former seminary was converted into the St. Charles Center, a retirement home for them. As this need peaked in 1980s and 1990s, the center became converted into a senior living center for lay people as well.
