= Carthagena, Ohio =

Unincorporated community in Ohio, U.S.

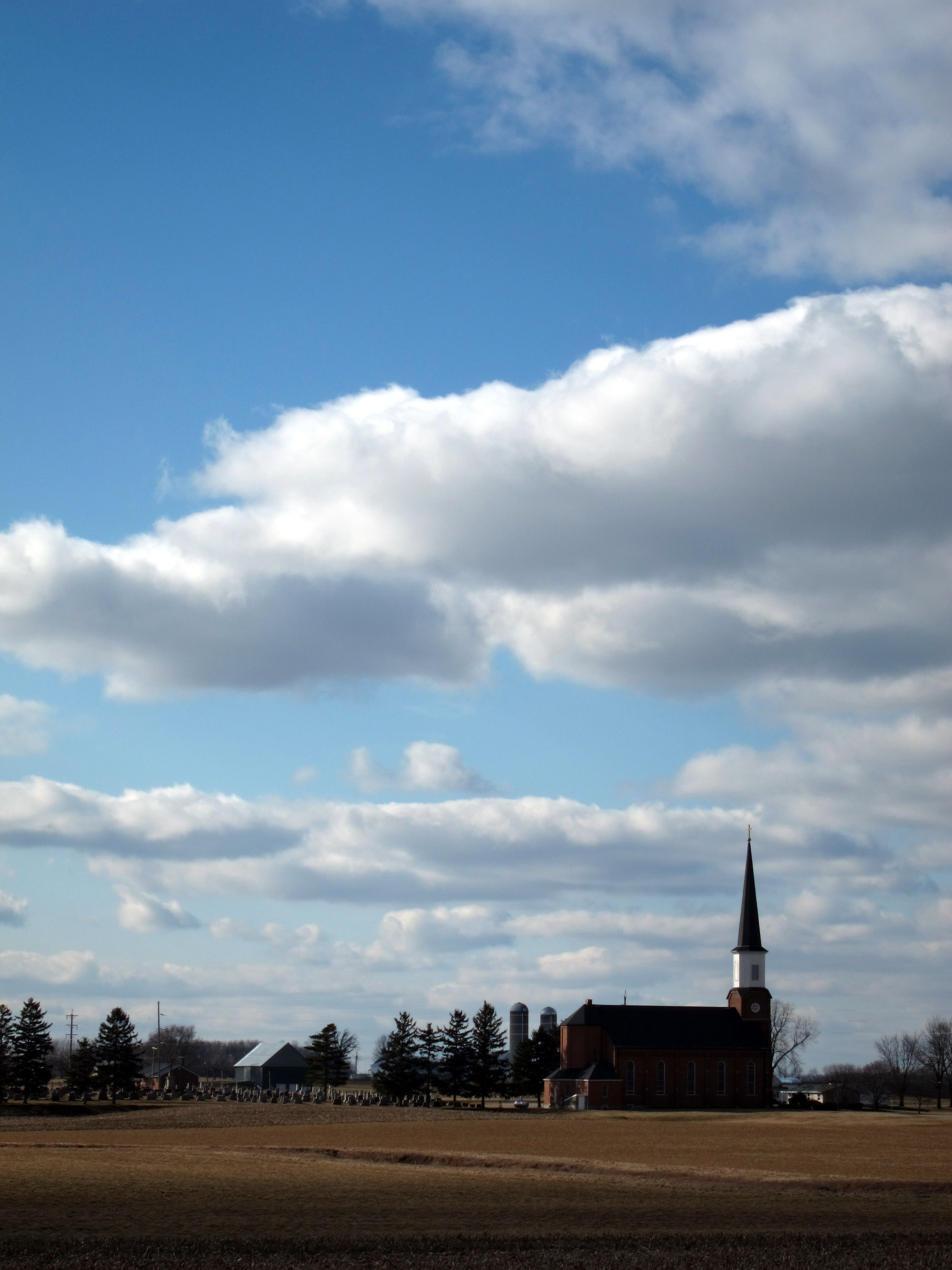
St. Aloysius Church in Carthagena

Carthagena (/ˌkɑːrθəˈdʒiːnə/ KAR-thə-JEE-nə) is an unincorporated community in Mercer County, Ohio, United States. Established by African Americans, it was home to an agricultural and industrial boarding school for African American and Indian orphans. It is located at 40°26′12″N 84°33′36″W and has an elevation of 909 feet (277 m).

== History ==
Carthagena was laid out in 1840. It is named after Cartagena, a city in the south-east of Spain. The village was started by Charles Moore from Harrison County, Kentucky around the same time Mercer County was established. Charles Moore was a black man and owned 160 acres of land in Carthagena.

Black people lived in Carthagena for over 100 years; the last known member of the black community in Carthagena was Albert Bowles, who died in 1957 and is buried in the black cemetery there. The land a black school stood on (Emlen Institution) was purchased by the Missionaries of the Precious Blood (C.P.P.S.) for $4,500 on March 14, 1861. A seminary was built and named St. Charles Seminary. The St. Charles Center has been operated by the Missionaries of the Precious Blood since then.

== See also ==
- Free African Americans
- Pee Pee Township, Ohio
- Rossville, Ohio
- Rumley, Ohio
