= St. John's Catholic Church (Fryburg, Ohio) =

- St. John Catholic Church and Parish Hall
- U.S. National Register of Historic Places
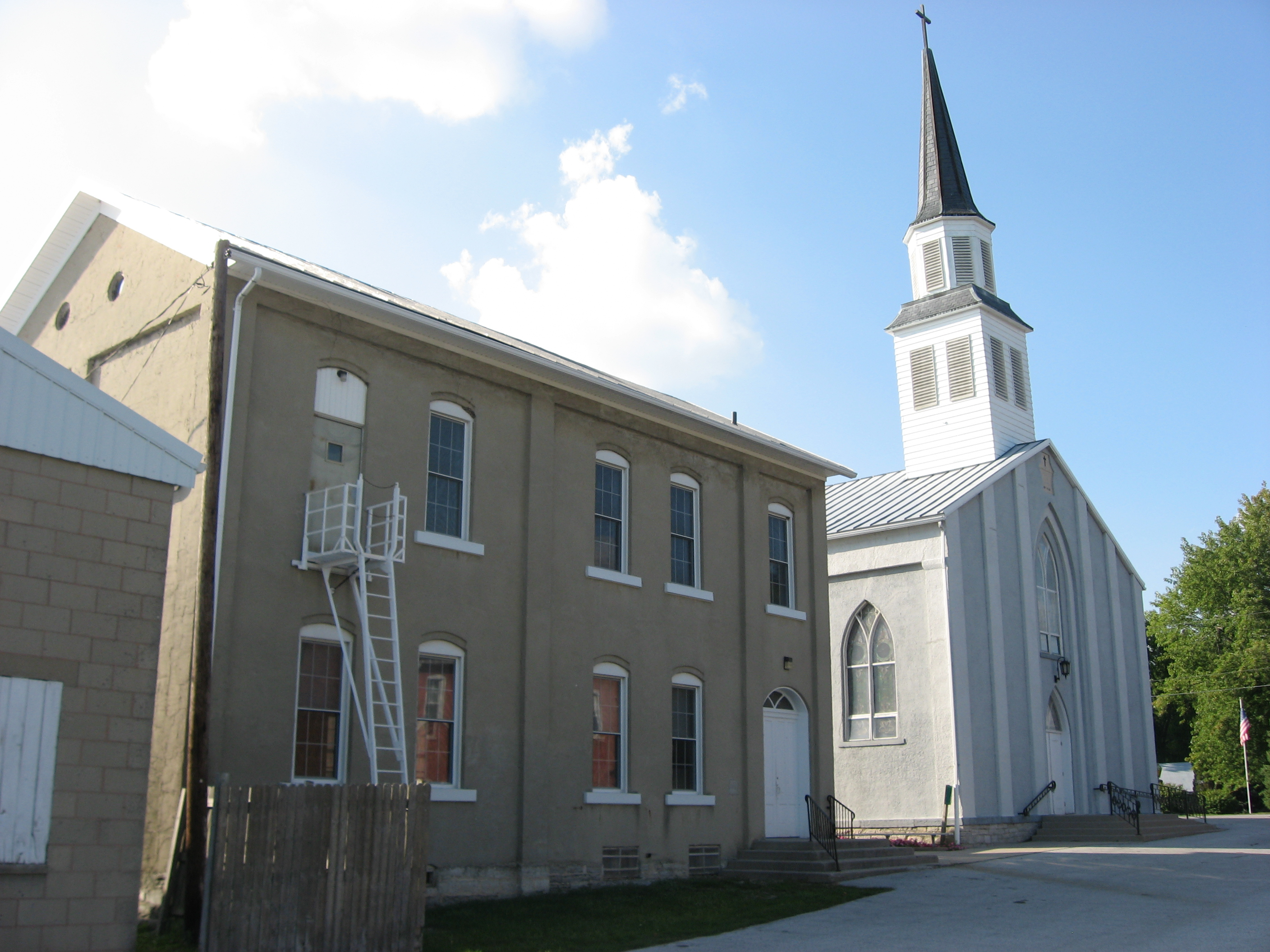
- Street view of the hall and church

- Location within Ohio Location within the United States
- Location: Southwestern corner of Schlemel and Van Buren Sts., Fryburg, Ohio
- Coordinates: 40°30′57.6″N 84°8′54″W
- Area: 1 acre (0.40 ha)
- Built: 1850
- Architectural style: Gothic Revival, Federal
- MPS: Cross-Tipped Churches of Ohio TR
- NRHP reference No.: 79003451
- Added to NRHP: July 26, 1979

St. John Catholic Church is a Roman Catholic church in the unincorporated community of Fryburg in Pusheta Township, Auglaize County, Ohio, United States. The parish was established in 1848, the same year in which the community was platted, and construction was completed in 1850. A Catholic school in connection with the church was established in 1877. Both buildings feature fine architecture: the church includes Gothic Revival elements such as ornate pilasters and lancet windows, while the former school is a good example of Federal architecture.

St. John's is one of many churches in western Ohio that historically has been served by the Society of the Precious Blood. It is one of the oldest extant Catholic churches in the region known as the "Land of the Cross-Tipped Churches": most contemporary churches in the region were log structures that have disappeared. Only St. Augustine's Church in Minster to the southwest remains a church, and it has been significantly modified by the addition of twin towers decades after construction. St. John retains its historic brick and stucco exterior, and its frescoed ceiling has been recognized as a leading aspect of its architecture. Throughout the Archdiocese of Cincinnati, there is only one church older than St. John's that survives without significant structural changes. St. John's and its parish hall were listed on the National Register of Historic Places in 1979, along with St. Augustine's and many other churches related to the Society of the Precious Blood in western Ohio.
