= Fryburg, Ohio =

Unincorporated community in Ohio, U.S.

Coordinates: 40°30′57″N 84°8′56″W

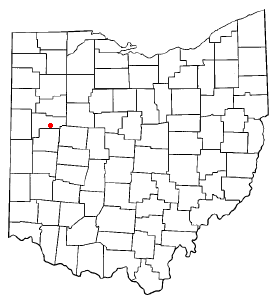
Location of Fryburg, Ohio

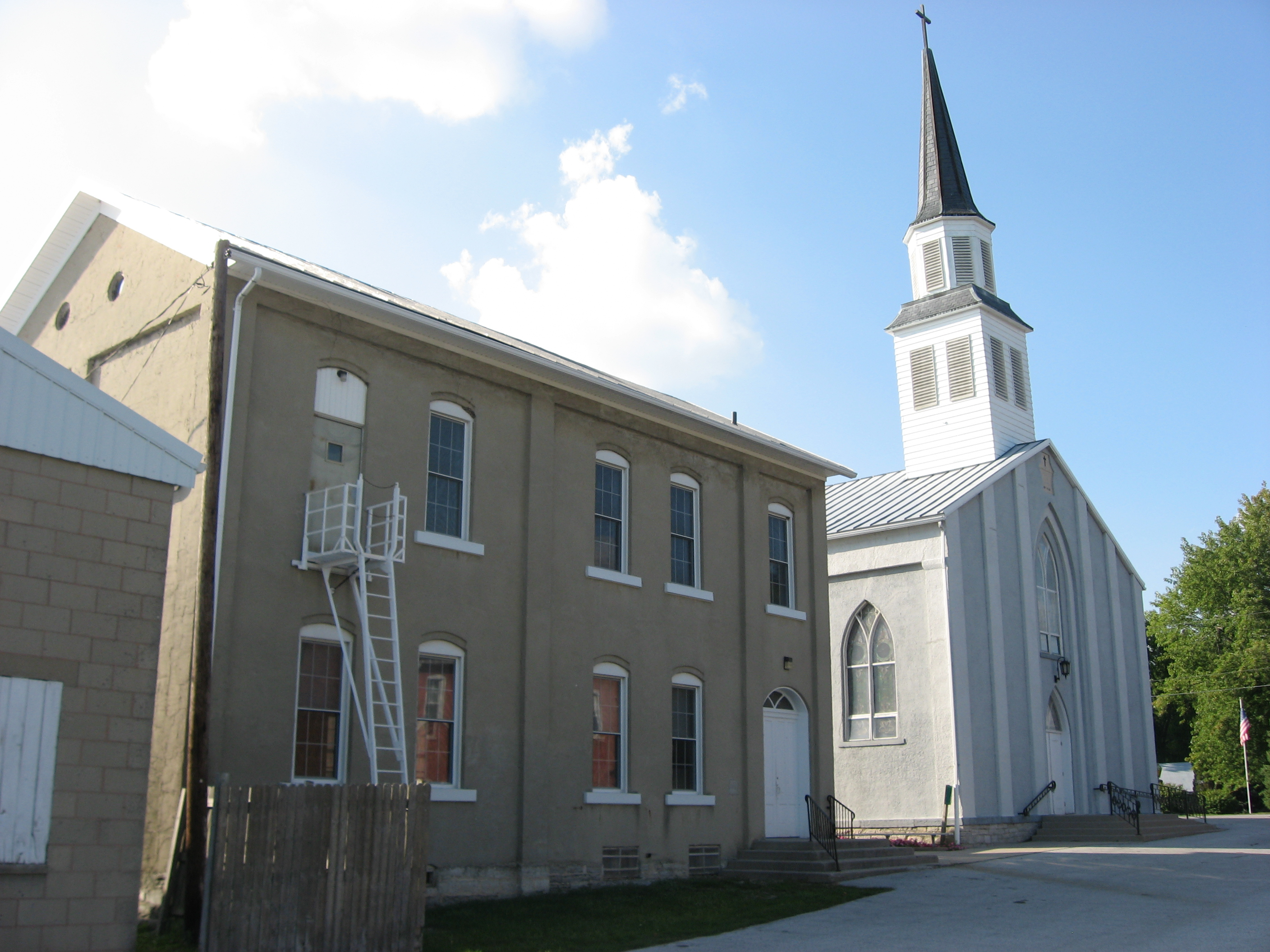
St. John Church

Fryburg (also Freyburg, Freyburgh, or Fryburgh) is an unincorporated community located in central Pusheta Township, Auglaize County, Ohio, United States.

It is located between Wapakoneta and Botkins. The community is served by the Wapakoneta City School District and the Wapakoneta (45895) post office.

== History ==
Fryburg was laid out in 1848 at the site of a former Native American settlement. A post office was established at Fryburg in 1847, and remained in operation until 1903. A community landmark is St. John's Catholic Church, which is listed on the National Register of Historic Places.

== Notable events ==
- The area was hit by a destructive EF3 tornado on 15 March 2024
- St. John's Catholic Church puts on the "Fryburg Homecoming" annually on the Sunday before Labor Day. This festival known colloquially as "Fryburg Fest" gathers thousands from the surrounding area and has been operating for 133 years as of 2023.
