= St. Joseph's Catholic Church (Wapakoneta, Ohio) =

- St. Joseph Catholic Church and School
- U.S. National Register of Historic Places
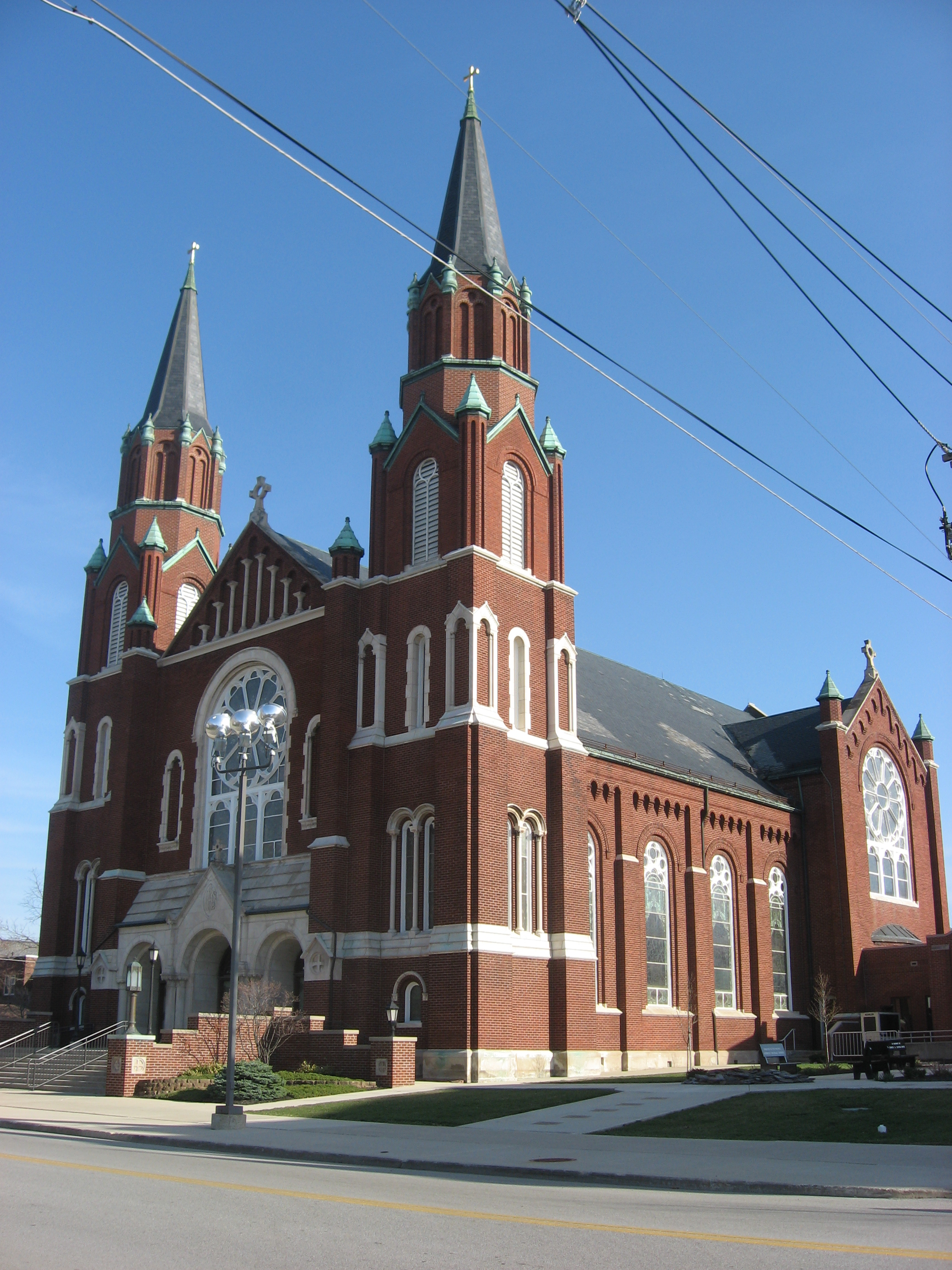
- Front and side of the church

- Location within Ohio Location within the United States
- Location: 309 S. Perry St., Wapakoneta, Ohio
- Coordinates: 40°34′4″N 84°11′43″W
- Area: 1.8 acres (0.73 ha)
- Built: 1899
- Architect: DeCurtins; John and Joseph Hemmert
- Architectural style: Romanesque Revival
- MPS: Cross-Tipped Churches of Ohio TR
- NRHP reference No.: 79003453
- Added to NRHP: July 26, 1979

St. Joseph's Catholic Church is a historic Roman Catholic church in Wapakoneta, Ohio, United States. Built in 1910, this church is home to an active Catholic parish, and it has been declared a historic site because of its well-preserved Romanesque Revival architecture.

== Early parish history ==
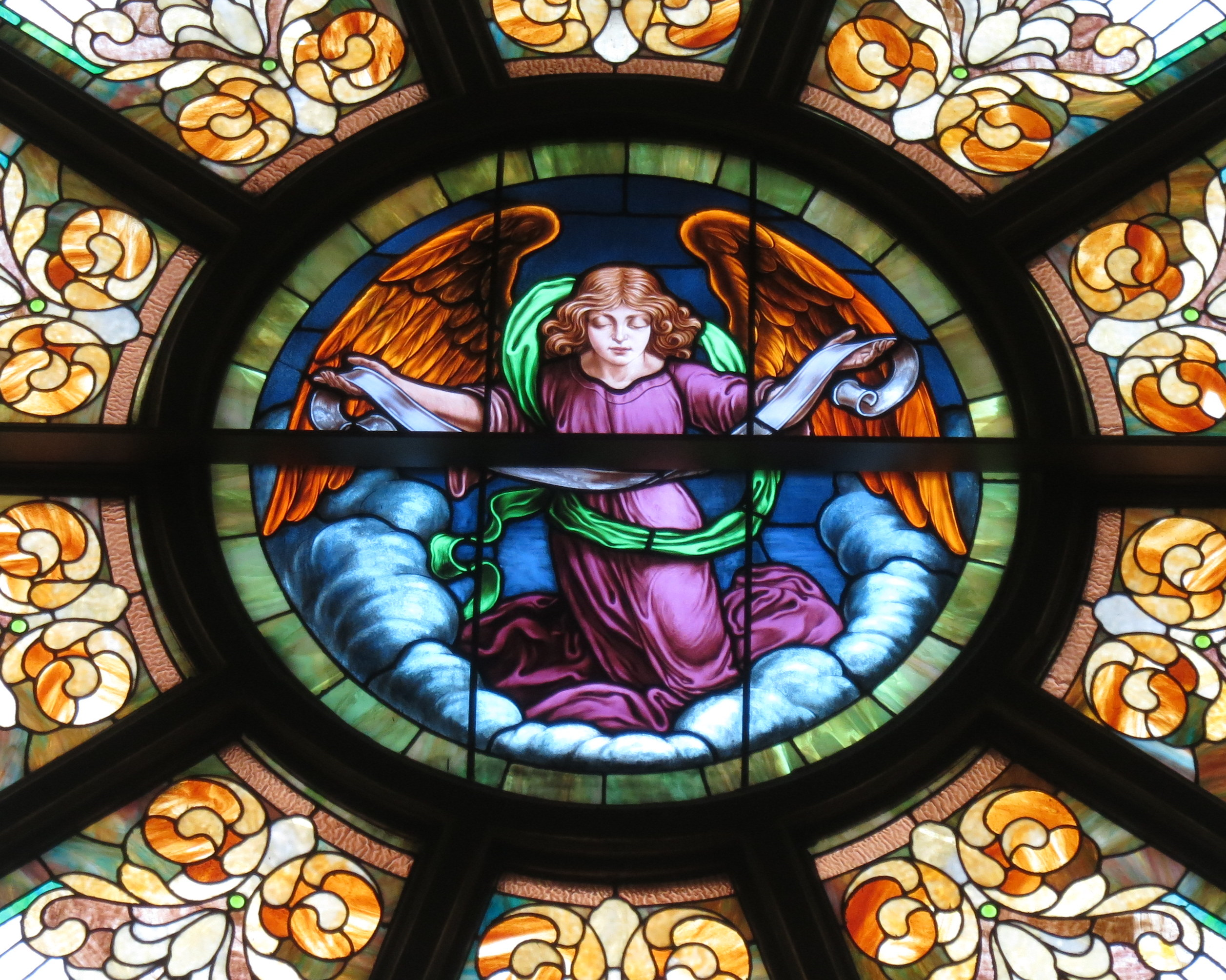
A stained glass window in the church

One of the first two Catholic priests in northern Ohio was John William Horstmann, a native of Osnabrück who had settled in the village of Glandorf to the north. Starting in 1832, he made monthly journeys of 50 miles (80 km) to Stallotown to the south. As Wapakoneta lies midway between these communities, he often visited with and celebrated Mass for its few Catholic families. After four years of these travels, he established a parish at Petersburg, approximately 4 miles (6.4 km) south of Wapakoneta.

By 1839, the Catholic community in Wapakoneta had grown to the point that it could be created a separate parish, and the members built a small frame church on the southeastern corner of the intersection of Pearl and Blackhoof Streets near the city's downtown. Although no resident pastor served the parish in its earliest years, membership grew during the 1840s and 1850s, and a priest was first assigned to the church in 1857. The expenses of maintaining even a small church caused the parish to be deep in debt during its earliest years, but it prospered greatly under the pastorate of Joseph Gregory Dwenger, later Bishop of Fort Wayne. Since 1850, the parish has been served by priests from the Congregation of the Precious Blood.

== Church building ==
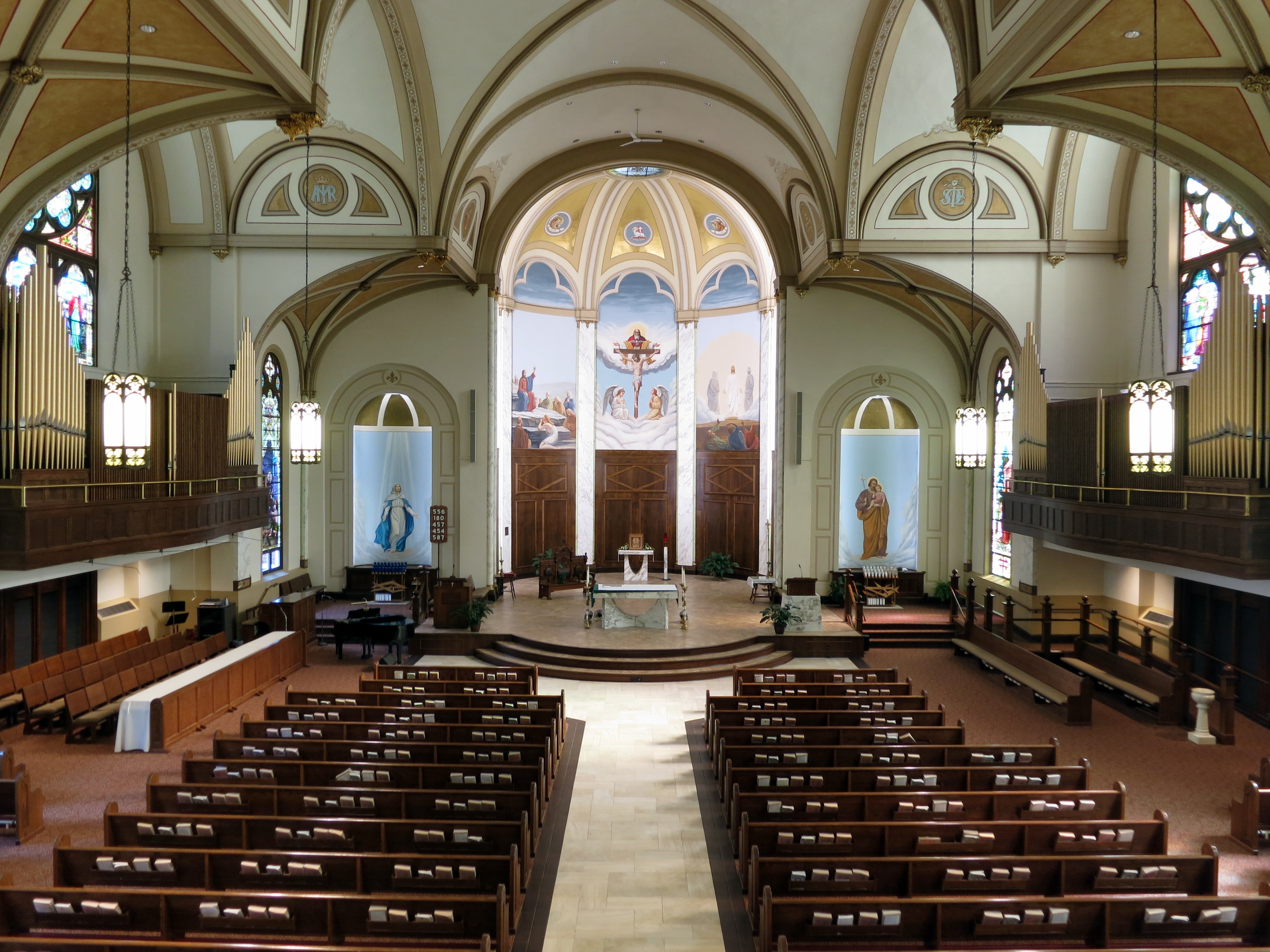
Interior as viewed from the loft

By the late 1850s, the parish's membership had grown significantly, and the original church had become too small; consequently, a larger brick structure was built to the east of the original building in 1858. Among its most distinctive elements were a massive single tower, four bells, and a large pipe organ. In later years, elderly parishioners remembered the organ and bells favorably: purchased for $2,200 and $1,700 respectively, they were seen as equal to any instruments of the twentieth century and as worthy of installation in the present church building respectively. This church was replaced in turn by the present structure in the early twentieth century. Construction of this Romanesque Revival building began under the direction of the DeCurtins family in 1910, and it was dedicated on October 8, 1911. A brick building supported by a stone foundation, the church includes architectural features such as two towers and a large rose window at the front, underneath which worshippers may enter the building through several large arched doors.

Architectural historians have divided the Precious Blood-related churches of western Ohio into multiple generations. Only a few buildings remain from the first generation, which consisted primarily of small wooden churches, and only St. John's Church in Fryburg remains essentially unchanged. Replacing these wooden buildings were the churches of the second generation, which were generally small brick buildings without tall spires. The churches of the third generation are mostly High Gothic Revival structures with tall towers, but the final generation of churches includes a wide range of styles. As a Romanesque Revival church built in 1910, St. Joseph's is one of the newest churches in the region, and it plainly is a part of the final generation.

== Related buildings ==
=== School ===
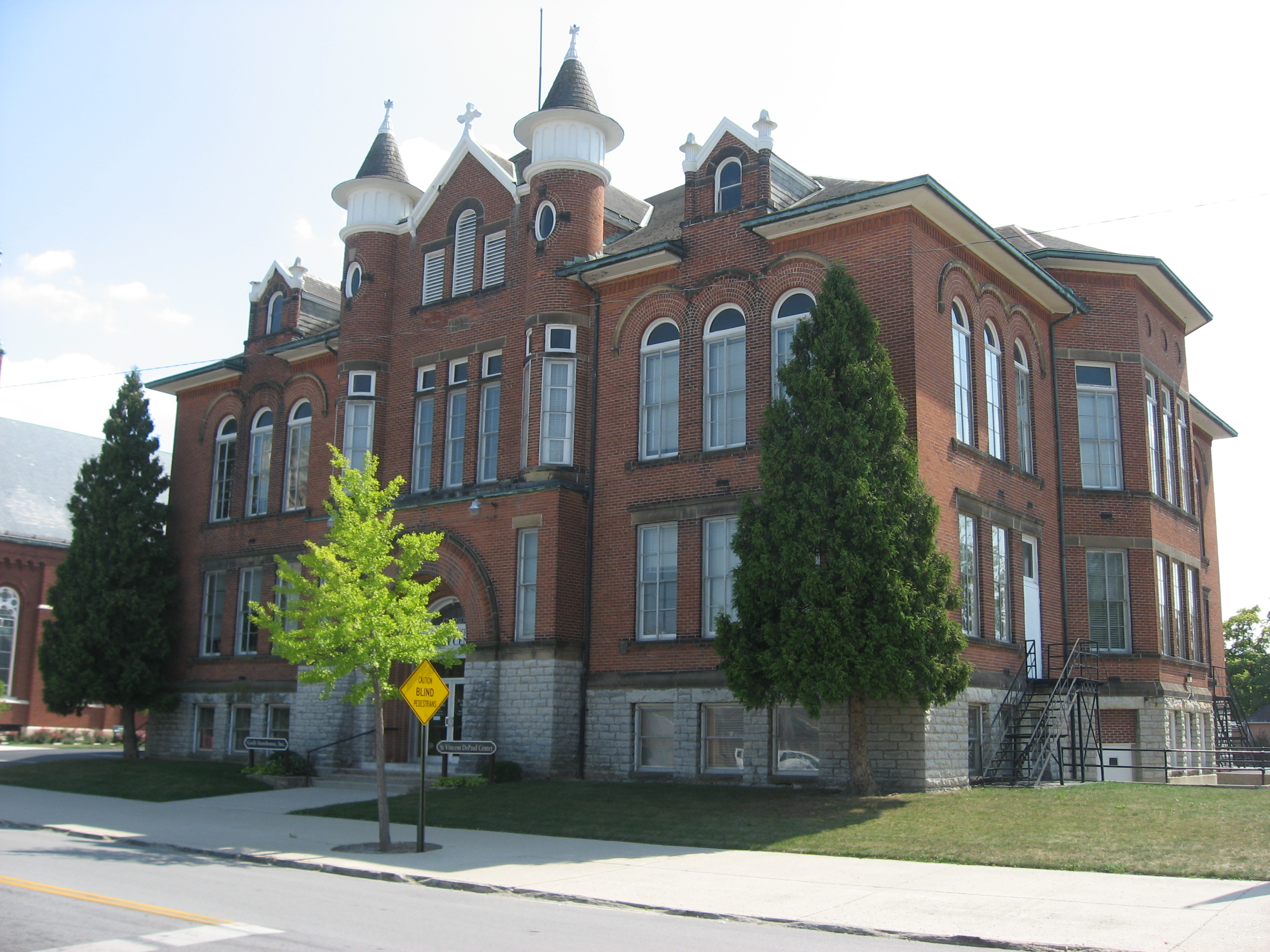
Front and side of the school

In 1853, the church purchased a frame building adjacent to its property and quickly opened a parish elementary school inside. After sixteen years, a larger structure was desired, and a larger brick building was erected immediately to the east of the church at a cost of $4,000. Continued growth necessitated its replacement by a newer building in 1899; this structure is still standing. With features such as towers and turrets, St. Joseph's School is one of the most architecturally-prominent Catholic schools in the region, along with schools in Minster, St. Henry, and Chickasaw.

As the parish continued to expand, a high school was opened in 1919; its classes met in the elementary school building until a new building was completed in 1961. However, financial issues caused the high school's closure in 1974; the elementary students were then transferred to the former high school, and the original elementary school was then leased to the Wapakoneta City School District.

=== Rectory ===
As well as completing its school in 1899, the parish also built a rectory in the same year. Expanded in 1922, the rectory was later converted into a convent.

== Recent history ==
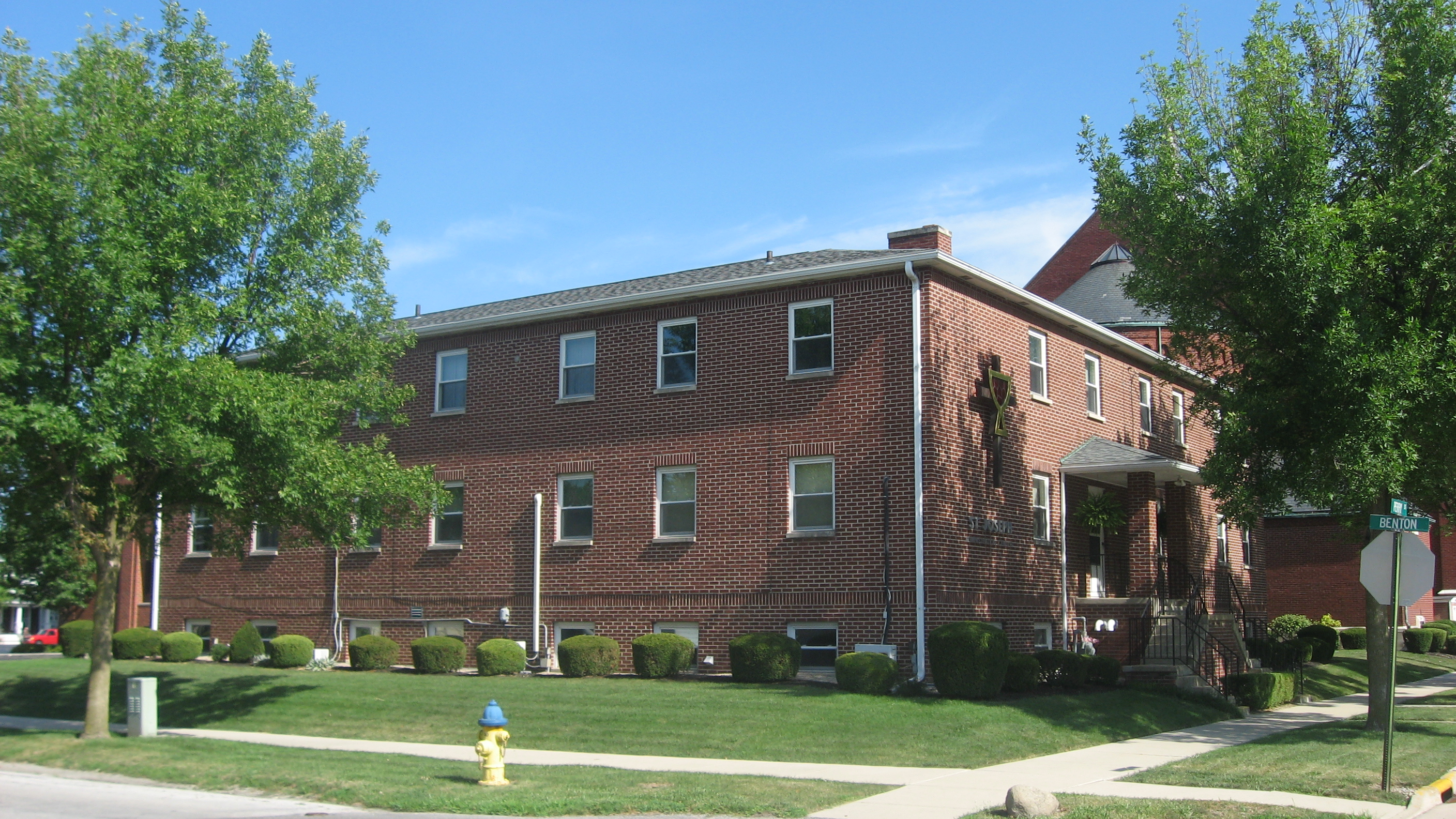
Parish offices, located behind the church

=== Current condition ===
Today, St. Joseph's Church is an active parish of the Archdiocese of Cincinnati. It is clustered with St. John parish in Fryburg, and the entire cluster is part of the St. Marys Deanery.

=== Recognition ===
In 1979, St. Joseph's Church and School were listed on the National Register of Historic Places because of their place in Ohio's history and because of their well-preserved historic architecture. They were among more than thirty different properties included in the "Cross-Tipped Churches of Ohio Thematic Resources," a multiple property submission of architecturally-important churches and church-related buildings in western Ohio related to the Congregation of the Precious Blood. These churches, primarily Gothic Revival structures with massive towers, have become the namesake of this heavily Catholic region, which is commonly known as the "Land of the Cross-Tipped Churches."
