= Hotel Argonne =

- U.S. National Register of Historic Places
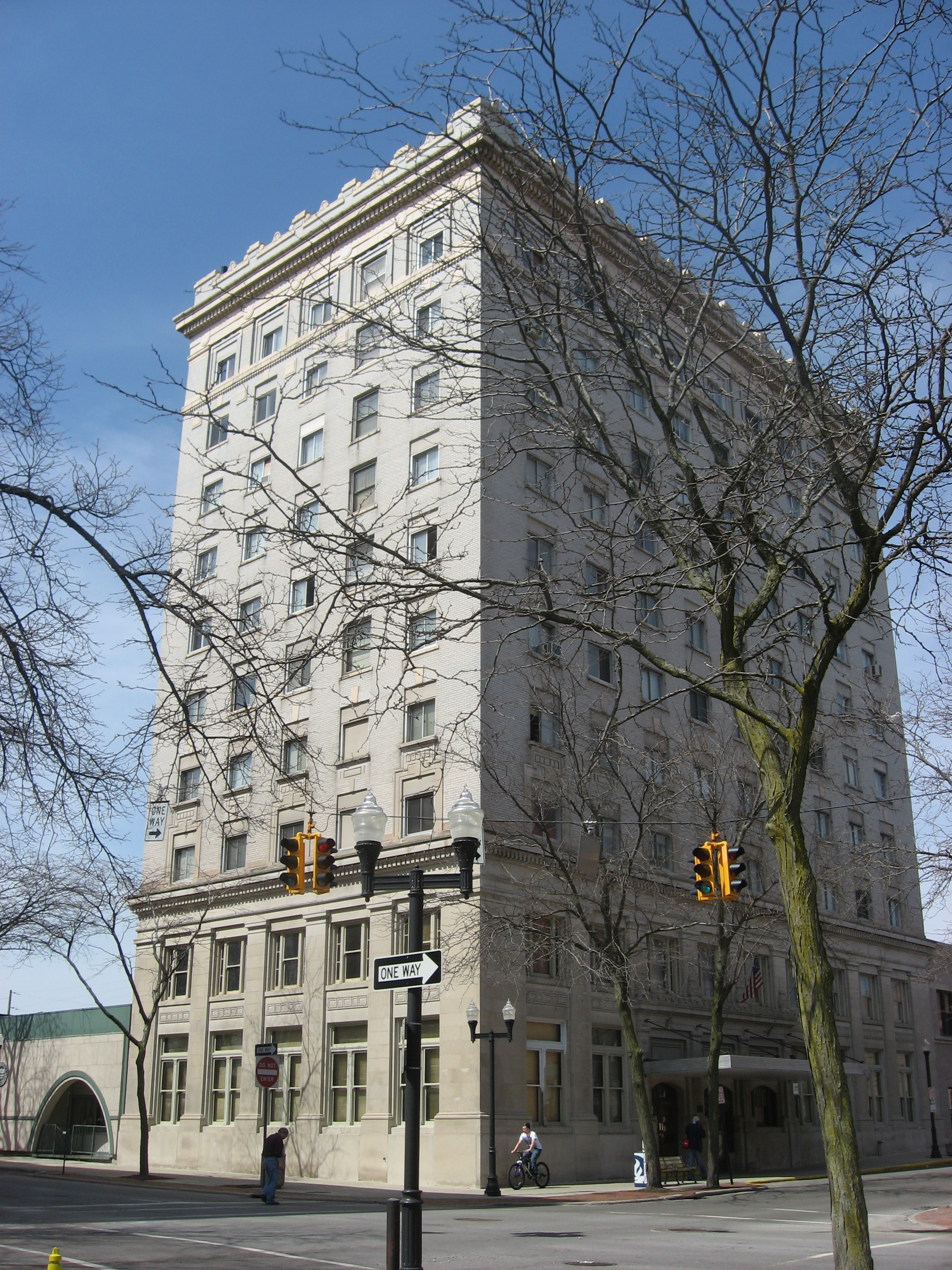
- Front and side of the hotel

- Location within Ohio Location within the United States
- Location: 201 N. Elizabeth St., Lima, Ohio
- Coordinates: 40°44′29″N 84°6′25″W
- Area: Less than 1 acre (0.40 ha)
- Built: 1919; 107 years ago
- Architect: Andrew de Curtins
- Architectural style: Early Commercial
- MPS: Lima MRA
- NRHP reference No.: 82001352
- Added to NRHP: October 7, 1982

The Hotel Argonne is a historic hotel in downtown Lima, Ohio, United States. Built in 1919, the hotel was dedicated to veterans of the Meuse-Argonne Offensive during the recently concluded World War I.

Designed by Andrew DeCurtins, the heavily ornamented ten-story hotel is built of limestone and brick. Among the exterior features are spandrels and pilasters with triple entablatures on the lowest two floors, plus a cornice with plentiful dentils and parapets. Inside, the lobby includes marble, various types of wood, and large amounts of decorative molding.

In 1982, the Hotel Argonne was listed on the National Register of Historic Places because of its architecture. It was part of the "Lima Multiple Resource Area", a group of seventeen architecturally significant Lima buildings that were added to the Register together. Like several other buildings in this collection, the hotel was among the last major structures erected in Lima's most prosperous years, during which oil wealth and the success of the Lima Locomotive Works were the most important parts of a thriving economy.
