= Minster Elementary School =

- U.S. National Register of Historic Places
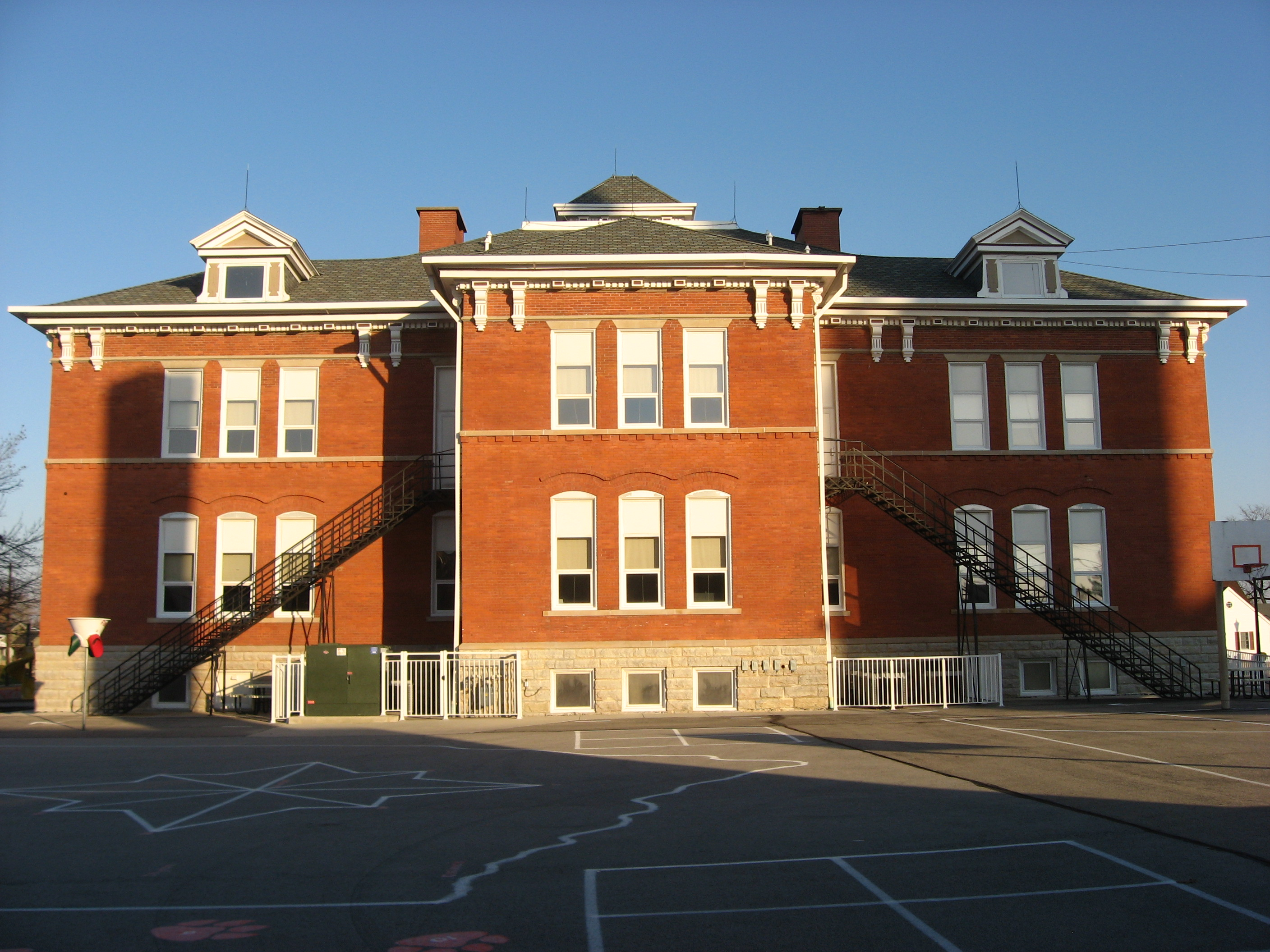
- Rear of the school

- Location within Ohio Location within the United States
- Location: Lincoln St., Minster, Ohio
- Coordinates: 40°23′42″N 84°22′44″W
- Area: 1 acre (0.40 ha)
- Built: 1904
- Architectural style: Italian Villa
- MPS: Cross-Tipped Churches of Ohio TR
- NRHP reference No.: 79002850
- Added to NRHP: July 26, 1979

The Minster Elementary School is a historic Catholic school building in Minster, Ohio, United States. Built in the early twentieth century, it has been recognized as a historic site.

== Architecture ==
Completed in 1906 in a modified version of the Italianate style, the school is an ornate two-and-one-half-story brick building, built on a stone foundation. Among its most distinctive features are a three-story tower in the center of the facade, ornamented brackets under the cornices of the corners, and dormer windows in the roof. The elementary school is related to St. Augustine's Catholic Church, which lies on the same property.

== Historic context ==
The early settlers of southwestern Auglaize County and surrounding regions placed great value on the education of their children. These predominantly Catholic people founded many schools in connection with their churches, several of which are still in existence. Although some of these schools — generally the older buildings — are small structures, several are larger and architecturally distinctive buildings; among this latter category are the schools at Minster, St. Henry, and Wapakoneta. A parish school was first established at Minster in 1867; as St. Theresa's School for Girls, it was partially meant to instruct girls who planned to enter the adjacent convent. This convent (now destroyed) was significant to the ecclesiastical position of St. Augustine's as one of the three mother churches of the Missionaries of the Precious Blood in western Ohio. Today, St. Augustine's is the only remaining one of these three — SS. Peter's and Paul's Church at Petersburg and St. Valbert's Church at St. Valbert have both been abandoned, and only their cemeteries remain.

== Historic preservation ==
In 1979, the Minster Elementary School was listed on the National Register of Historic Places because of its well-preserved historic architecture. More than thirty other buildings, including St. Augustine's Church and eight other schools, were added to the Register at the same time as part of the "Cross-Tipped Churches of Ohio Thematic Resources." This group of buildings qualified for inclusion on the Register primarily because their historic architecture represented their connections to the Missionaries of the Precious Blood. Because many of these buildings are churches with tall Gothic Revival towers, the region has come to be known as the "Land of the Cross-Tipped Churches."
