= DeCurtins =

American architect

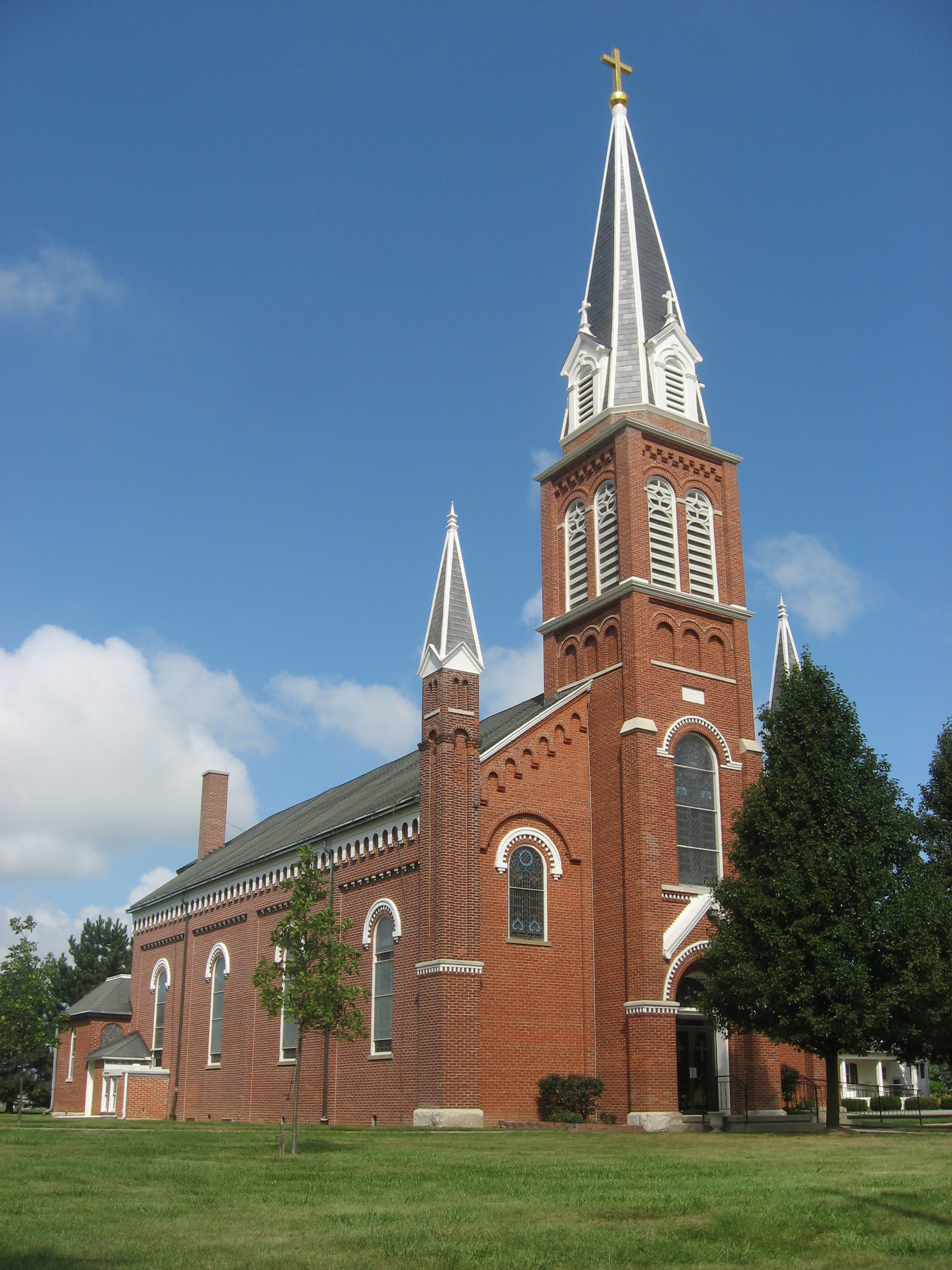
St. Anthony's Church

The DeCurtins family, sometimes written De Curtins, were involved in Midwestern U.S. church architecture. Anton De Curtins (J. A. De Curtins) was a Swiss immigrant who lived in Carthagena, Ohio and designed several Gothic Revival architecture churches in Mercer County, Ohio, as well as rectories, schools and residences. Anton was a master carpenter, and with his sons he directed the building and decorating of the steepled churches that "still shine across the surrounding flatness of the Northwestern Ohio landscape".

Anton designed St. Aloysius' Catholic Church in Carthagena, one of Swiss missionary priest Francis de Sales Brunner's churches for German Catholics in far western Ohio's Land of the Cross-tipped Churches.

Anton's grandson Frederick designed Immaculate Conception High School (1933) in Celina, Ohio.

== Projects by Anton DeCurtins (J.A. DeCurtins) ==
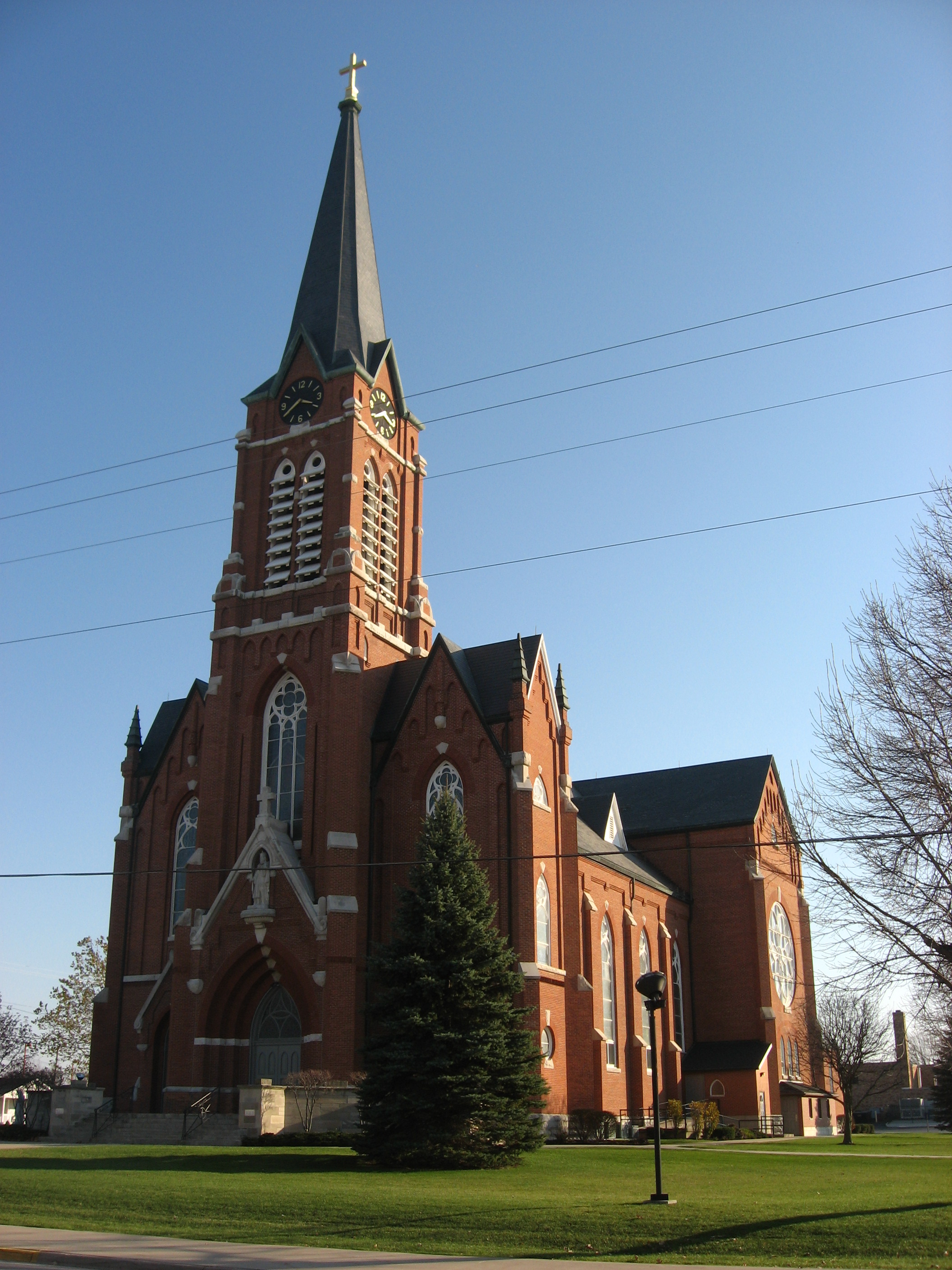
St. Henry's Church

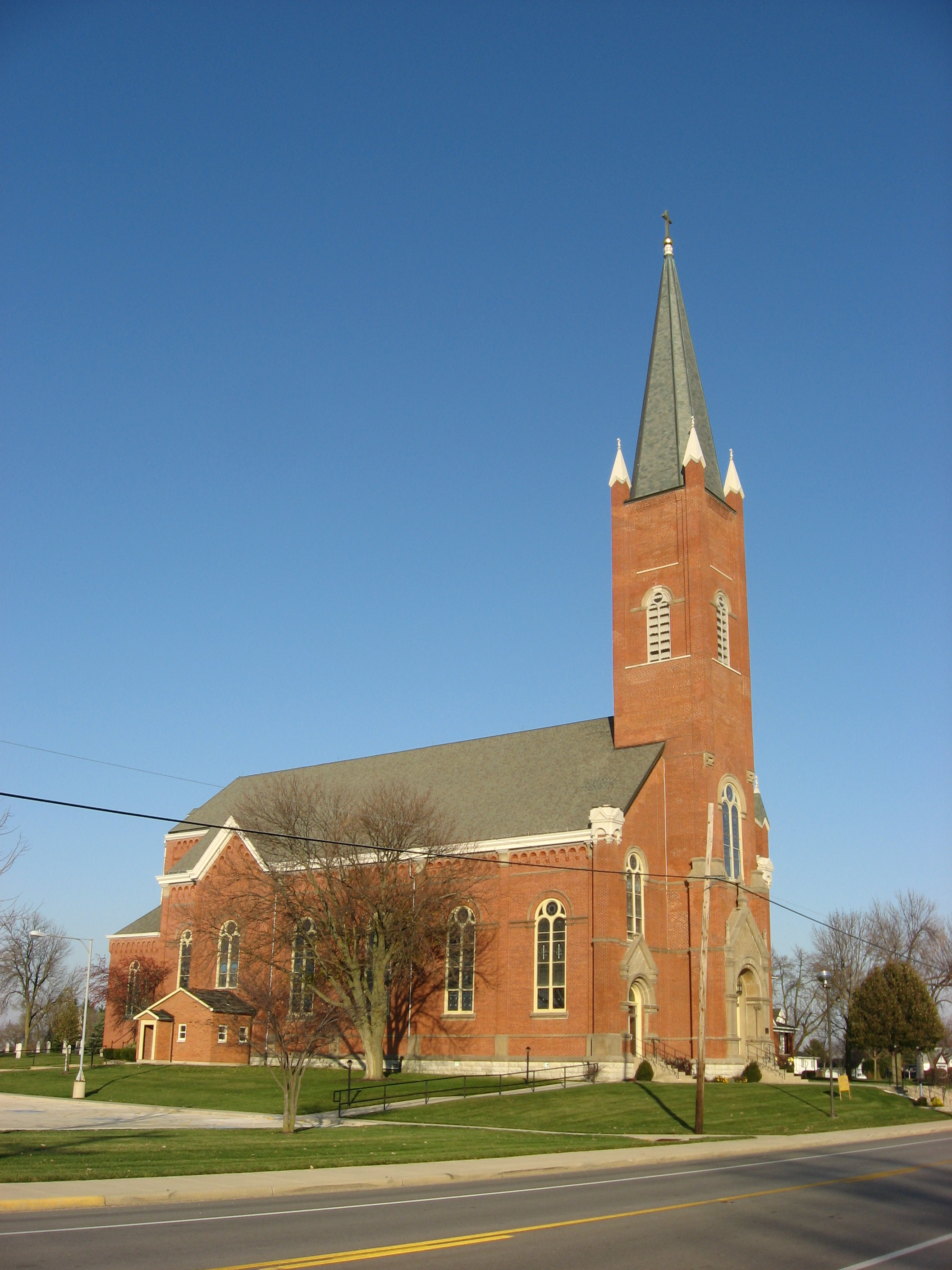
Maria Stein's Church

- St. Aloysius' Catholic Church, a Gothic Revival architecture style building in Mercer County added to the National Register of Historic Places in 1979
- St. Anthony's Catholic Church (1879) on Rt. 49 and St. Anthony Road in Padua, Ohio was added to the NRHP in 1979 as building #79002821.
- St. Joseph Catholic Church and Rectory, added to the NRHP in 1979 as building #79002820 is located on Sawmill and St. Joe Roads in Mercer County
- Maria Stein Catholic Church and Rectory, also known as Saint John Catholic Church and Rectory, is credited to DeCurtins and Adolphus Druiding. It is located at St. John's Rd. and OH 119 in Maria Stein, Ohio was added to the NRHP in 1979 as building #79002828.
- St. Henry's Catholic Church, a Gothic Revival church on Main St. in St. Henry, Ohio. Added to the NRHP in 1979 as building #79002829.
- St. Paul's Catholic Church and Rectory, Gothic Revival buildings at R.R. 1 and Ft. Recovery in Sharpsburg, Ohio. Added to the NRHP in 1979 as building #79002827.

== Andrew DeCurtins ==
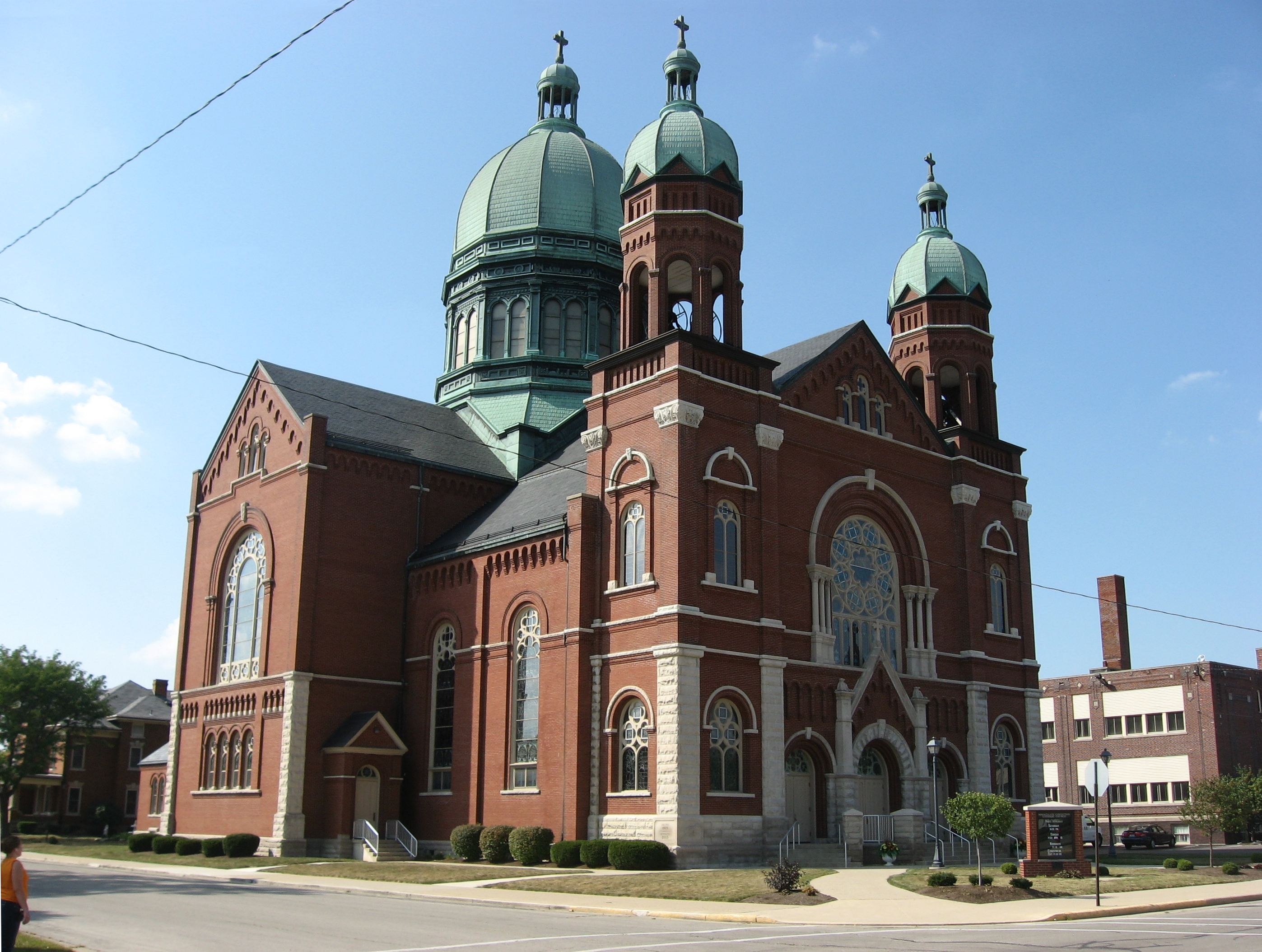
Immaculate Conception Church

- St. Sebastian's Catholic Church a Gothic Revival architecture style church building at Sebastian Rd. and OH 716-A in Sebastian, Ohio in Mercer County. Added to the NRHP in 1979 as building #79002830
- Immaculate Conception Catholic Church Complex a Romanesque Revival building group at Anthony and Walnut Streets in Celina, Ohio. Credited to John Burkhart and Andrew De Curtins. It was added to the NRHP in 1979 as building #79002833.

== DeCurtins ==
- Chickasaw School and Rectory, also known as Precious Blood Catholic Rectory, Italianate style buildings on Maple Street in Chickasaw, Ohio that were added to the NRHP in 1979 as building #79002848.
- Coldwater Catholic Church Complex, also known as Holy Trinity Catholic Church Complex, a Gothic and Renaissance Revival-style building at E. Main and 2nd Streets in Coldwater, Ohio. Added to the NRHP in 1979 as building #79002832.
- St. Francis Catholic Church and Rectory, buildings in a Spanish Mission Revival and Gothic Revival architecture style at Cranberry and Ft. Recovery-Minster Road in Cranberry Prairie, Ohio. Added to the NRHP in 1979 as building #79002837.
