= St. Anthony's Catholic Church (Padua, Ohio) =

- St. Anthony Catholic Church, Padua
- U.S. National Register of Historic Places
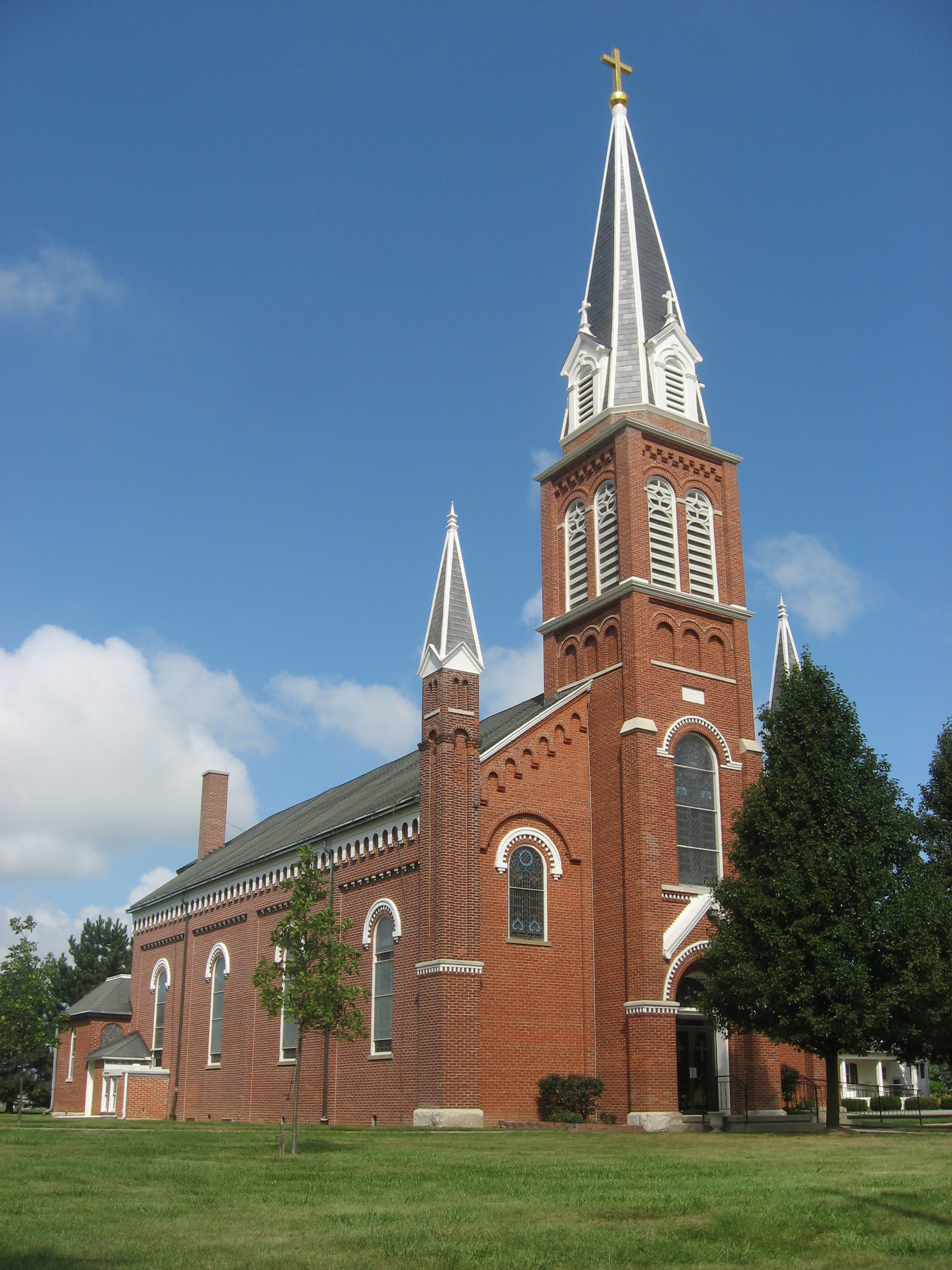
- Front of the church

- Location within Ohio Location within the United States
- Location: Junction of State Route 49 and St. Anthony Rd. in Padua, Ohio
- Coordinates: 40°30′32″N 84°47′7″W
- Area: 1 acre (0.40 ha)
- Built: 1879
- Architect: J.A. De Curtins
- MPS: Cross-Tipped Churches of Ohio TR
- NRHP reference No.: 79002821
- Added to NRHP: July 26, 1979

St. Anthony's Catholic Church is a historic Roman Catholic church in Padua, an unincorporated community in Washington Township, Mercer County, Ohio, United States. Built in the late nineteenth century, it remains the home of a functioning congregation, and it has been recognized as a historically significant building because of its architecture.

== Early history ==
Founded in 1848, Padua is one of the oldest communities in the region. No church existed in Padua in its first few years; in order to hear Mass, the Catholics of the community typically traveled to Minster, over 20 miles (35 km) away. After the parish was established in 1852, its members quickly built a small log church. Itinerant priests from the Society of the Precious Blood visited the church occasionally; lacking a priest on many Sundays, the people often found it necessary to travel to St. Peter's Church, 6 miles (10 km) away, for worship.

== Construction ==
By the 1870s, the congregation had grown to the point that the old log church had become too small to hold its parishioners. After a member, Gerhard Homann, donated land slightly south of the original church, preparations for construction began in 1873. At this time, workers began to bring stone from New Bremen for the church's foundation, while others began to make bricks at the site of the future church. Local architect Anton DeCurtins designed the new structure, which was built by a Mr. Van Oss of Minster. Under their leadership, construction was completed in 1875 and the building was finished in 1879.

The single-story church was erected atop a basement; its walls were faced with a stretcher bond, and the gabled roof was finished with slates. Among its most distinctive elements are the square pilasters on each corner of the building's facade. Inside, many of the walls of the sanctuary were decorated with frescoes, and it was lit by stained glass windows donated by members of the congregation. The sanctuary was further enriched by the installation of a large high altar in 1880 and a pipe organ in 1900.

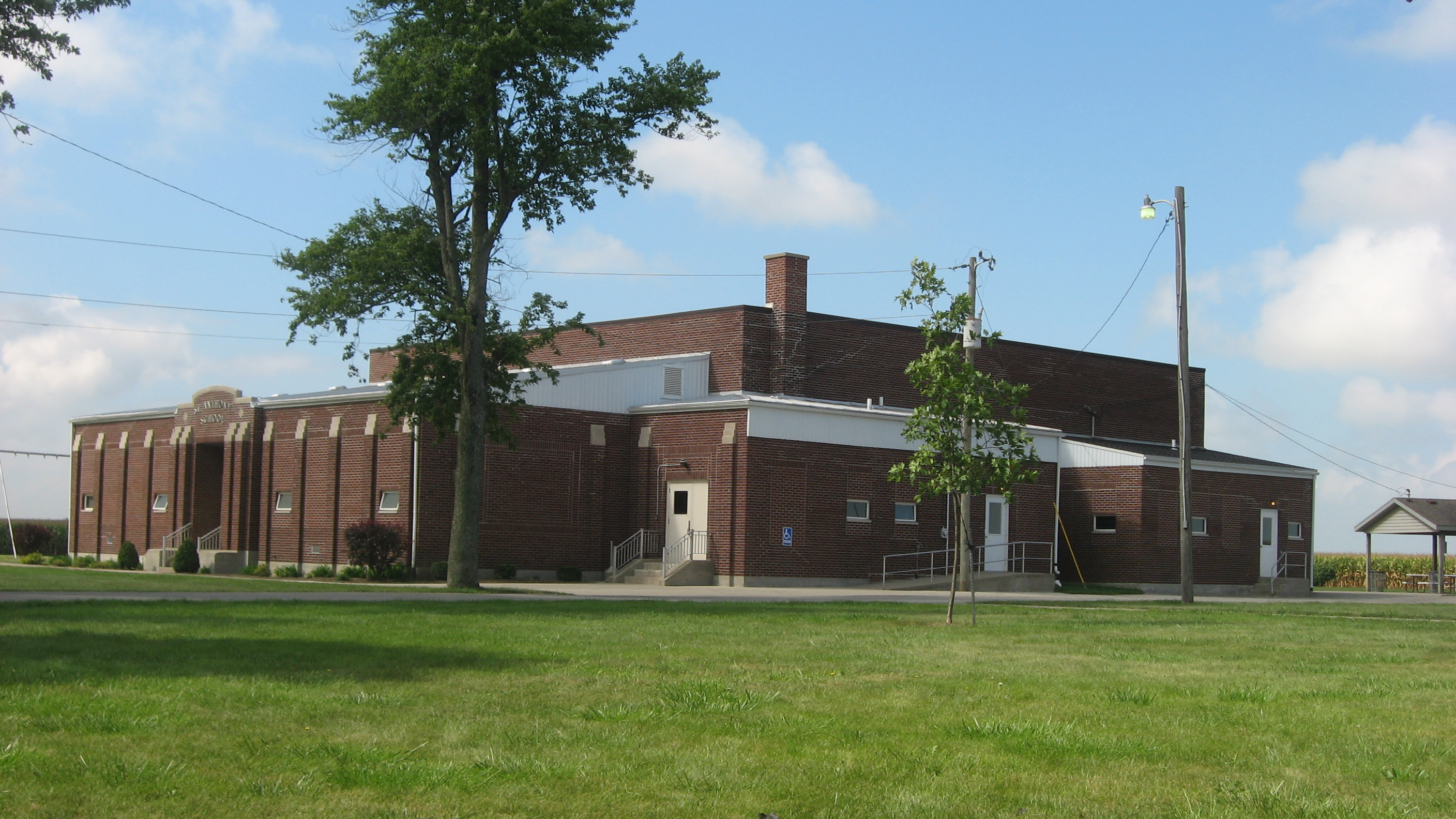
Parish Hall: former St. Anthony's School

Architectural historians have divided the Precious Blood-related churches of western Ohio into multiple generations. Only a few buildings remain from the first generation, which consisted primarily of small wooden churches, and only St. John's Church in Fryburg remains essentially unchanged. Replacing these wooden buildings were the churches of the second generation, which were generally small brick buildings without tall spires. St. Anthony's simple brick walls and rectangular floorplan places it in the second generation; its large tower, atypical of second-generation churches, is the result of an expansion in 1900, which also included the enlargement of the sacristy and the addition of frescoes on the ceiling. It is not the only church in the region that has been expanded vertically; the first-generation St. Augustine's Catholic Church in Minster now includes massive twin towers, which were added more than 25 years after the church was built.

Located near the church are a former rectory, built in 1900, and a former parish school, which is now used as a parish hall. Both buildings and one cemetery lie adjacent to the church, while an older cemetery is located near the site of the parish's original building, approximately ¼ mile north of the present church.

== Recent history ==
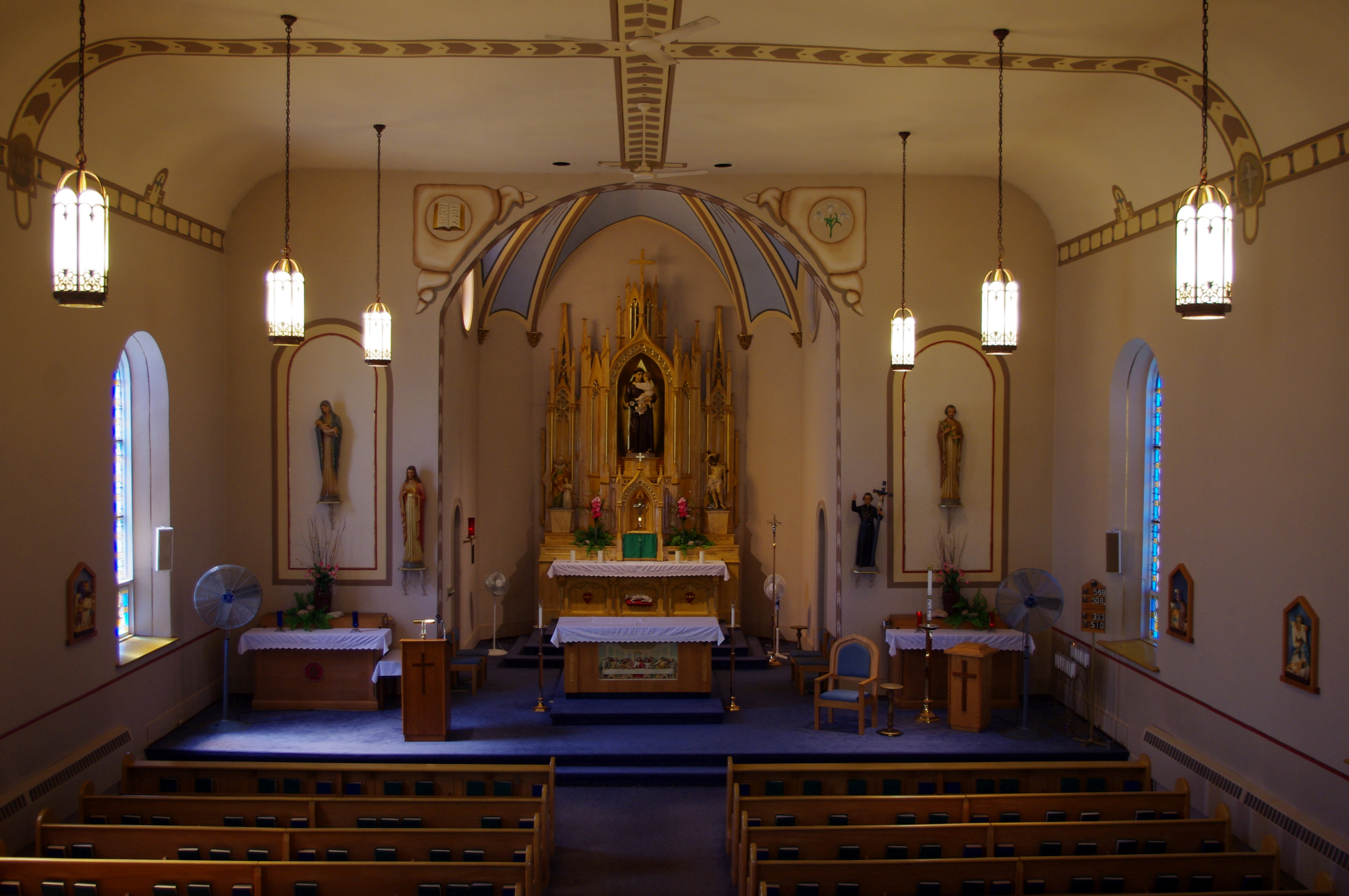
The church nave as viewed from the loft.

An architectural survey performed in 1977 rated both the interior and the exterior of the church in good condition. Two years later, the church was recognized for its architecture and its high quality of preservation when it was added to the National Register of Historic Places. Thirty-three other buildings related to the Society of the Precious Blood, including twenty-six churches, were added to the Register at the same time. The church dominates the architecture of Padua, which remains a tiny community.

Today, St. Anthony's remains an active parish of the Archdiocese of Cincinnati. It is clustered with Holy Trinity parish in Coldwater and St. Mary parish in Philothea; the entire cluster is a part of the St. Marys Deanery.

== Notes ==
a: The National Register of Historic Places database lists the church in "St. Anthony," but the United States Geological Survey and the cited source show the community's name as "Padua"; "St. Anthony" is listed as an alternate name.
