= Sharpsburg, Mercer County, Ohio =

Unincorporated community in Ohio, U.S.

Coordinates: 40°22′04″N 84°42′35″W

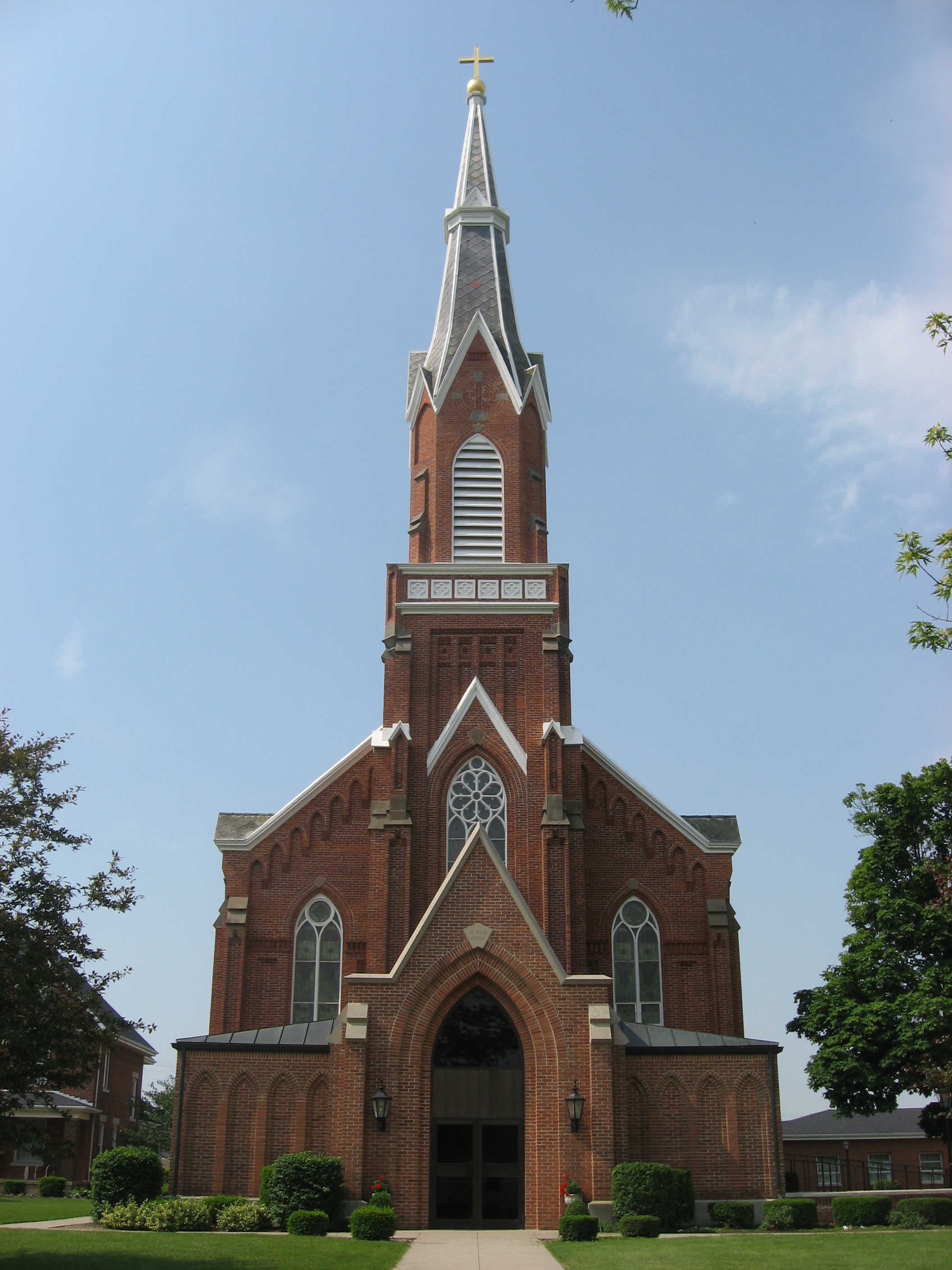
St. Paul's Catholic Church (Sharpsburg, Ohio)

Sharpsburg is an unincorporated community in Mercer County, in the U.S. state of Ohio.

== History ==
The post office at Sharpsburg was called Violet. This post office was established in 1886, and remained in operation until 1904.
