= Padua, Ohio =

Unincorporated community in Ohio, U.S.

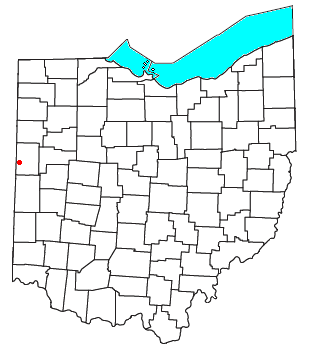
Location of Padua, Ohio

Padua is an unincorporated community in western Washington Township, Mercer County, Ohio, United States. It lies at the intersection of State Route 49 and St. Anthony Road, west of the city of Celina, the county seat of Mercer County. Its elevation is 899 feet (274 m), and it is located at 40°30′30″N 84°47′2″W.

== History ==
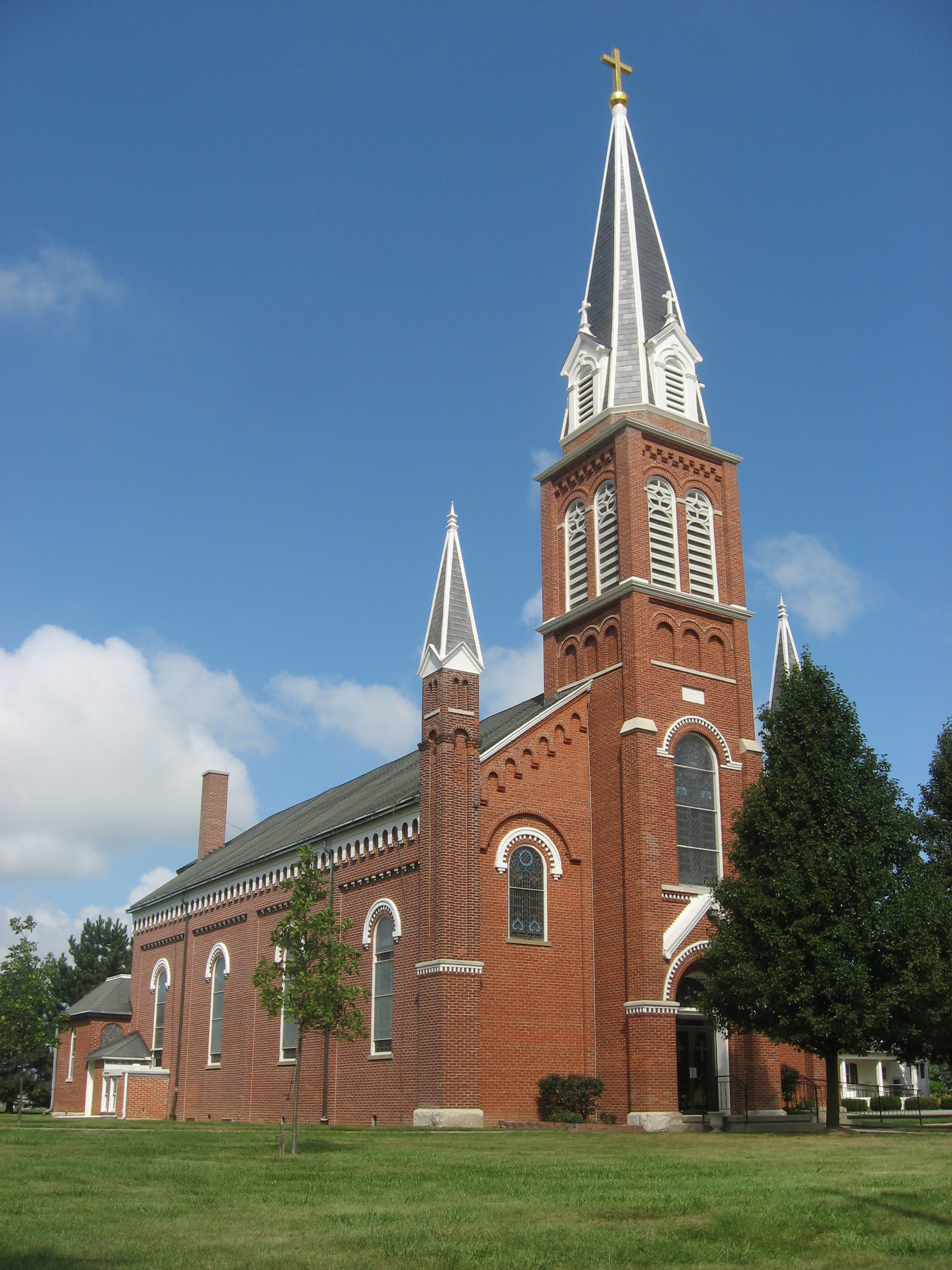
St. Anthony's Church in Padua

Founded in 1848, Padua is one of the oldest communities in the region. A post office was established in Padua on July 27, 1882, and operated for approximately twenty years: after it was discontinued on August 31, 1903, the community's mail was sent through the Fort Recovery post office. The leading building in Padua is St. Anthony's Catholic Church, which is located at the community's central intersection. Other properties in the community include the St. Anthony Cemetery and a former school, which operated from 1940 to 1978.

Aside from the name "Padua," the community has also been known by the name of "St. Anthony." The United States Board on Geographic Names officially ruled in favor of the current name in 1961, although sign posts at either end of town refer to the town as "St. Anthony," and locals refer to the town as St. Anthony.
