= St. Henry's Catholic Church (St. Henry, Ohio) =

- St. Henry Catholic Church
- U.S. National Register of Historic Places
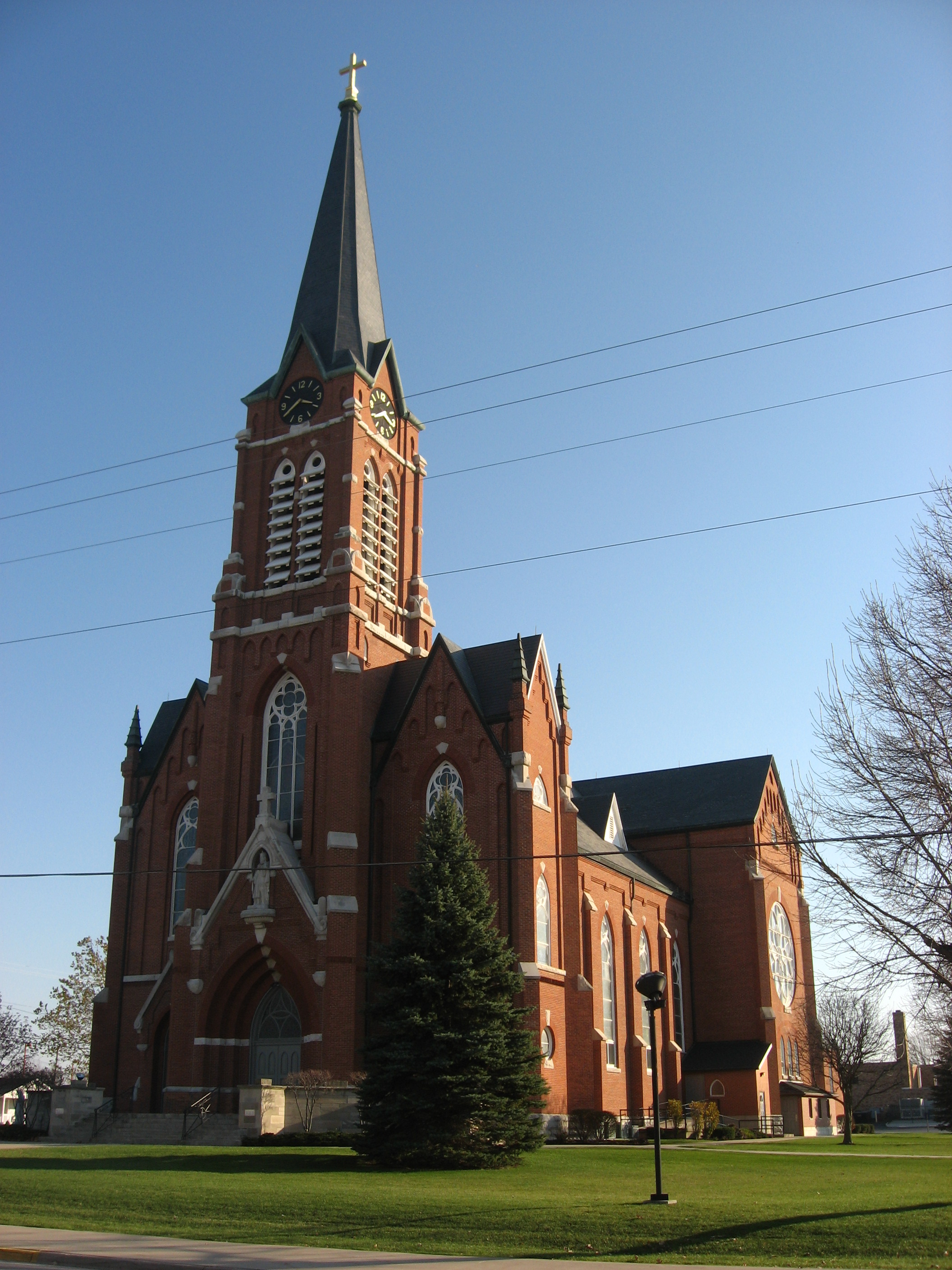
- Side of the church

- Location within Ohio Location within the United States
- Location: Main St., St. Henry, Ohio
- Coordinates: 40°25′3″N 84°38′15″W
- Area: 3 acres (1.2 ha)
- Built: 1897
- Architect: Adolphus Druiding (1838 - 1899)
- Architectural style: Gothic Revival
- MPS: Cross-Tipped Churches of Ohio TR
- NRHP reference No.: 79002829
- Added to NRHP: July 26, 1979

St. Henry's Catholic Church is an historic Catholic church in St. Henry, Ohio, United States. Built in the late nineteenth century, it remains the home of a functioning congregation, and it has been recognized as a historically significant building because of its architecture.

== Early history ==
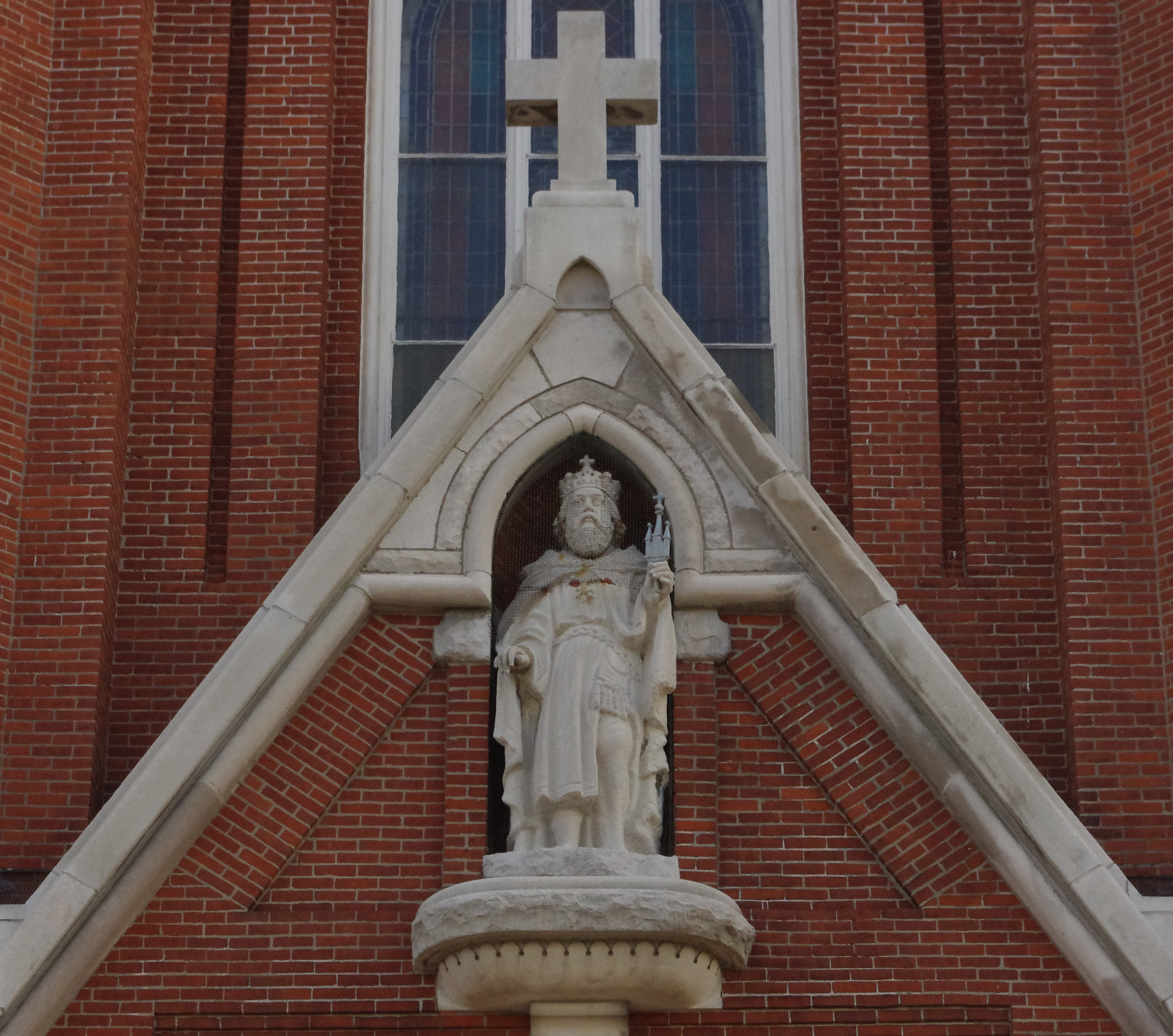
Granite statue of Saint Henry II, Holy Roman Emperor, above the main portal by sculptor Herman Brockmann of Cincinnati

St. Henry Parish was established in 1839, two years after the village of St. Henry was founded. Served by the Missionaries of the Precious Blood, it was named for Henry II, who reigned as Holy Roman Emperor during the eleventh century. At that time, there were few Catholics in St. Henry and the surrounding Granville Township; consequently, the congregation's first church building (erected in 1840) was a small frame structure. It was replaced by a brick church that was completed in 1854 at a cost of $7,000.

== Current structure ==
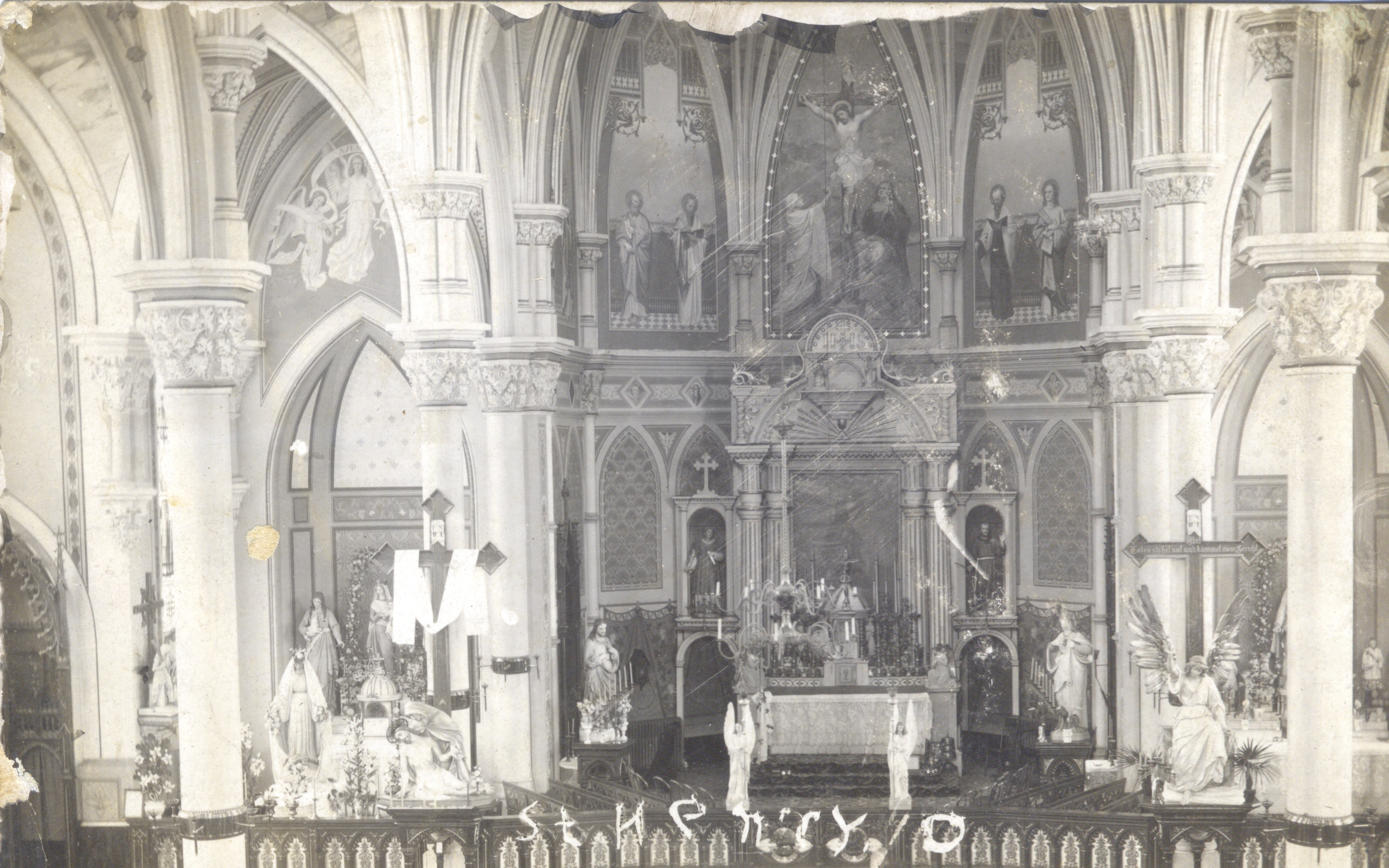
The church interior as it appeared before remodeling in the 1970s.

By the 1890s, the membership of St. Henry's Church had grown to the point that a new church building was necessary. Construction began on the new structure in 1895; while much of the construction work was performed by parishioners, the design was the responsibility of German-born architect, Adolphus Druiding of Chicago. The contractors were the DeCurtins Brothers. Construction was finished in 1897, at a cost of approximately $100,000. An estimate in the early twentieth century pronounced the church the most costly in northwestern Ohio.

The church is a Gothic Revival structure, built in the shape of a Latin cross. Its exterior consists of brick walls and a gabled roof, upheld by a stone foundation. The most prominent aspect of its exterior is a massive belfry and clock tower, approximately 200 feet (60 m) tall. Large rose windows illuminate the interior, which features painted and frescoed walls; the distance from the floor to the apex of the ceiling vault is 62 feet (19 m). The exterior design is similar to two other churches by Adolphus Druiding; St. Patrick (1891) in Toledo, OH and St. Michael (1890) in Rochester, NY. A major renovation project in the 1970s led to significant changes in the sanctuary, including the removal of frescoes by Austrian-born artist, Joseph Vittur, statues and its High Gothic altar., designed by the E.Hackner Co., LaCrosse, WI.

Architectural historians have divided the Precious Blood-related churches of western Ohio into four generations. St. Henry's is typical of the churches of the third generation, which are generally Gothic structures with a single central tower.

=== Stained glass windows ===
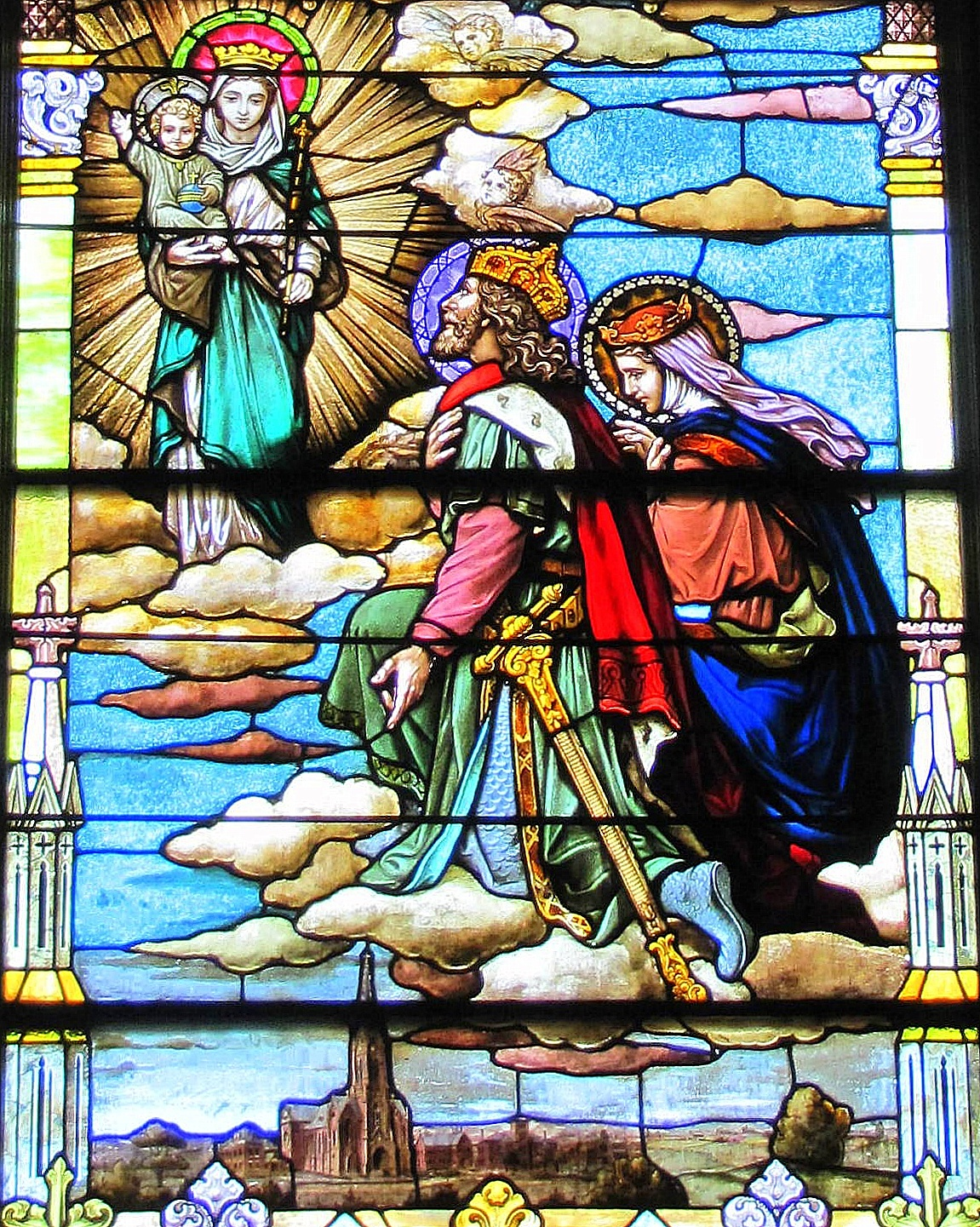
Saint Henry in Heaven interceding for St. Henry Church parishioners

The church interior is adorned with Munich-style stained glass windows.

Subjects of the transept rose windows

- Sacred Heart of Jesus
- Immaculate Heart of Mary

Subjects of the pictorial windows

- Christ as the Good Samaritan
- Saint Francis beholding a vision of Jesus and the Virgin Mary
- St. Gaspar del Bufalo preaching
- A vision of Saint Agnes
- Saint Aloysius receiving a vision of the Virgin Mary
- The martyrdom of Saint Cyriacus
- Saint Henry interceding with Jesus and the Virgin Mary in Heaven on behalf of parishioners
- The Immaculate Conception of the Blessed Virgin Mary

== Associated buildings ==
A brick rectory lies next to the church's eastern side. Built in 1901, it combines a range of architectural styles into an elaborate house. Located behind the rectory are a catechetical center and a public elementary school. An older parochial school was once located on the church's western side; built in the Italianate style in 1905, it served as a public junior high school after the church discontinued its use.

== Recent history ==
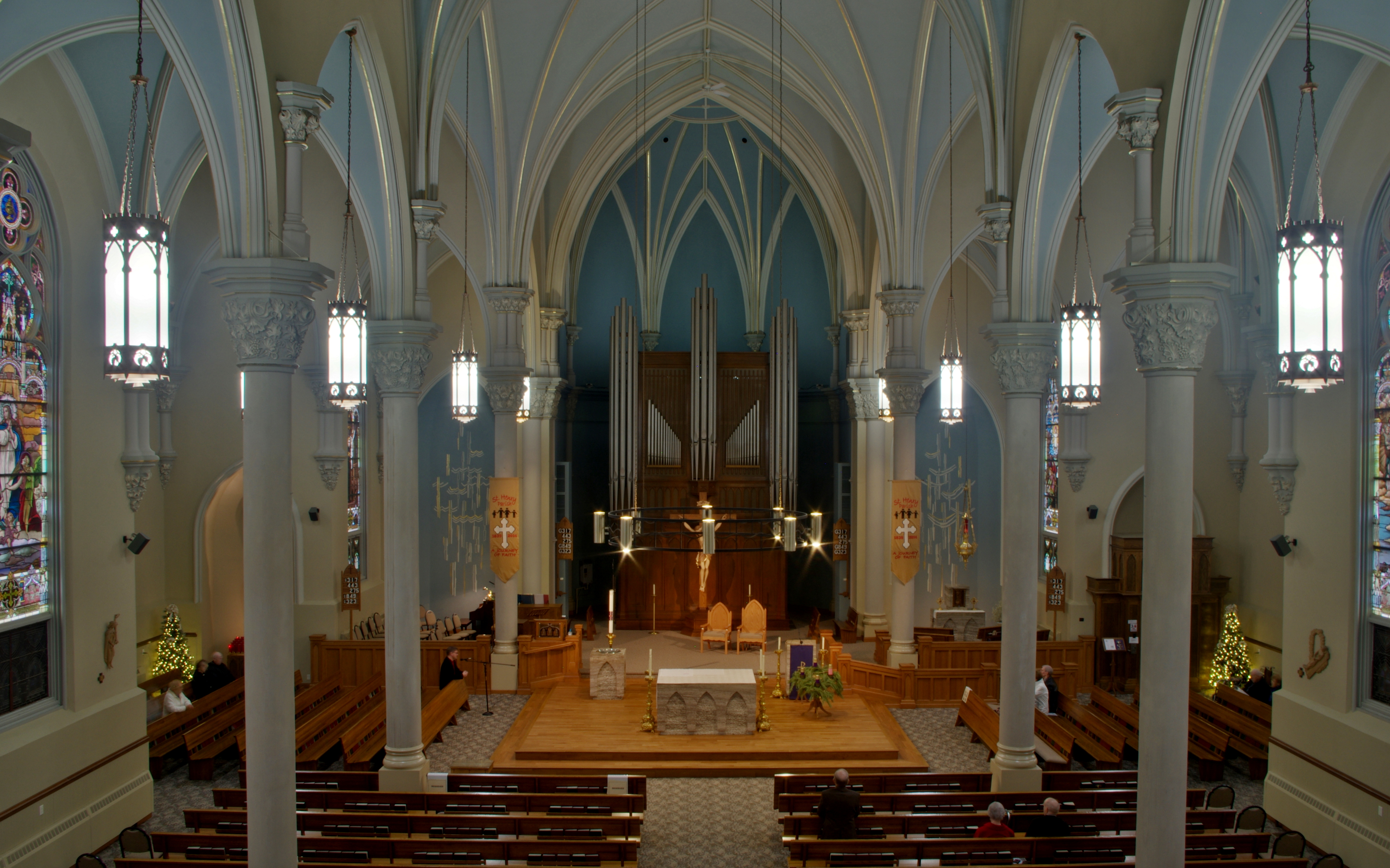
The church nave with Advent decoration

An architectural survey performed in 1977 rated the exterior of St. Henry's Church in good condition. Two years later, the church was recognized for its architecture and its high quality of preservation when it was added to the National Register of Historic Places. Thirty-three other buildings related to the Society of the Precious Blood, including twenty-six churches, were added to the Register at the same time.

Today, St. Henry's remains an active parish of the Archdiocese of Cincinnati. It is part of the St. Henry Cluster, along with St. Aloysius Parish in Carthagena, St. Bernard Parish in Burkettsville, St. Francis Parish in Cranberry Prairie, and St. Wendelin Parish in St. Wendelin. The entire cluster is a part of the St. Marys Deanery.
