= Superior General of the Priestly Fraternity of St. Peter =

Official title of the head of the Priestly Fraternity of Saint Peter

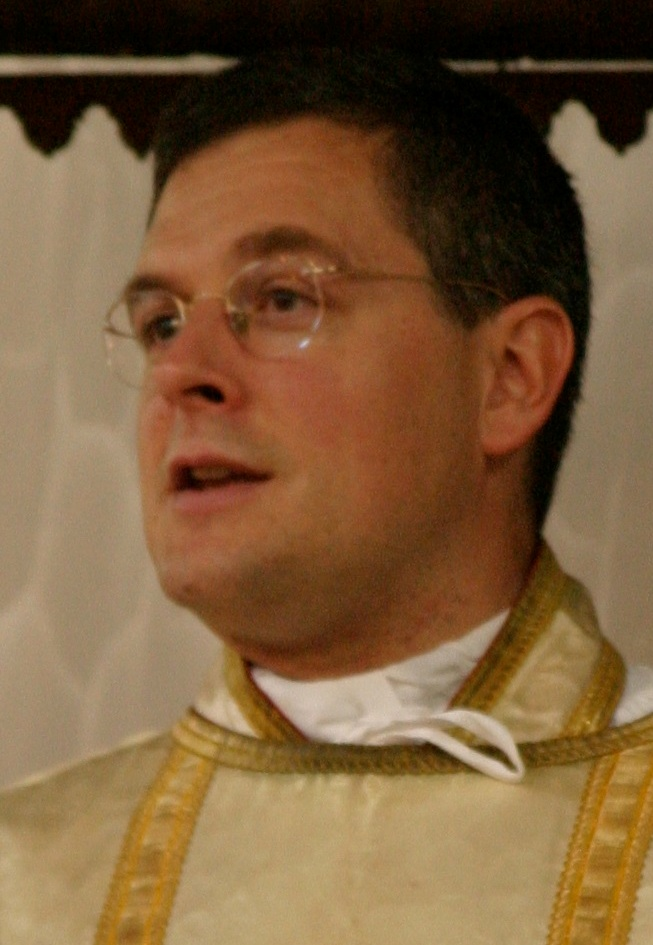
- Incumbent; The Very Reverend Fr. John Berg FSSP since 15 July 2024
- Abbreviation: SG
- Member of: FSSP
- Term length: 6 years
- First holder: The Very Reverend Fr. Josef Meinrad Bisig FSSP
- Website: https://www.fssp.org/

The Superior General of the Priestly Fraternity of St. Peter is the official title of the head of the Priestly Fraternity of St. Peter (or FSSP). The first position holder was The Very Reverend Fr. Josef Meinrad Bisig FSSP who was ordained His Grace The Most Reverend Marcel-François Lefebvre CSSp, the Founder of the Society of Saint Pius X.

== Title ==
The formal title in Latin is Praepositus Generalis, which may fairly be rendered as "superior general" or even, "president general".

== Current holder ==
The current Superior General is The Very Reverend John Berg FSSP, an American Priest who was elected for three six year terms in 2006, 2012, and 2024 at Our Lady of Guadalupe Seminary located in Denton, Nebraska.

== List of Superiors General ==
No.	Superior General	Portrait	Took office	Birthplace (Note: Lists the present-day name and nationality of the city in question.)	Duration (in days)
1	Josef Bisig		1988	Steinhausen, Switzerland	4380
2	Arnaud Devillers		2000	France	2190
3	John Berg		2006	Minnesota, United States	4380
4	Andrzej Komorowski		2018	Łomża, Poland	
5	John Berg		2024	Minnesota, United States	Incumbent

== See also ==
- Priestly Fraternity of St Peter
- Superior General of the Society of Jesus
- Superior General of the Society of Saint Pius X
