= List of churches in the Archdiocese of Cincinnati =

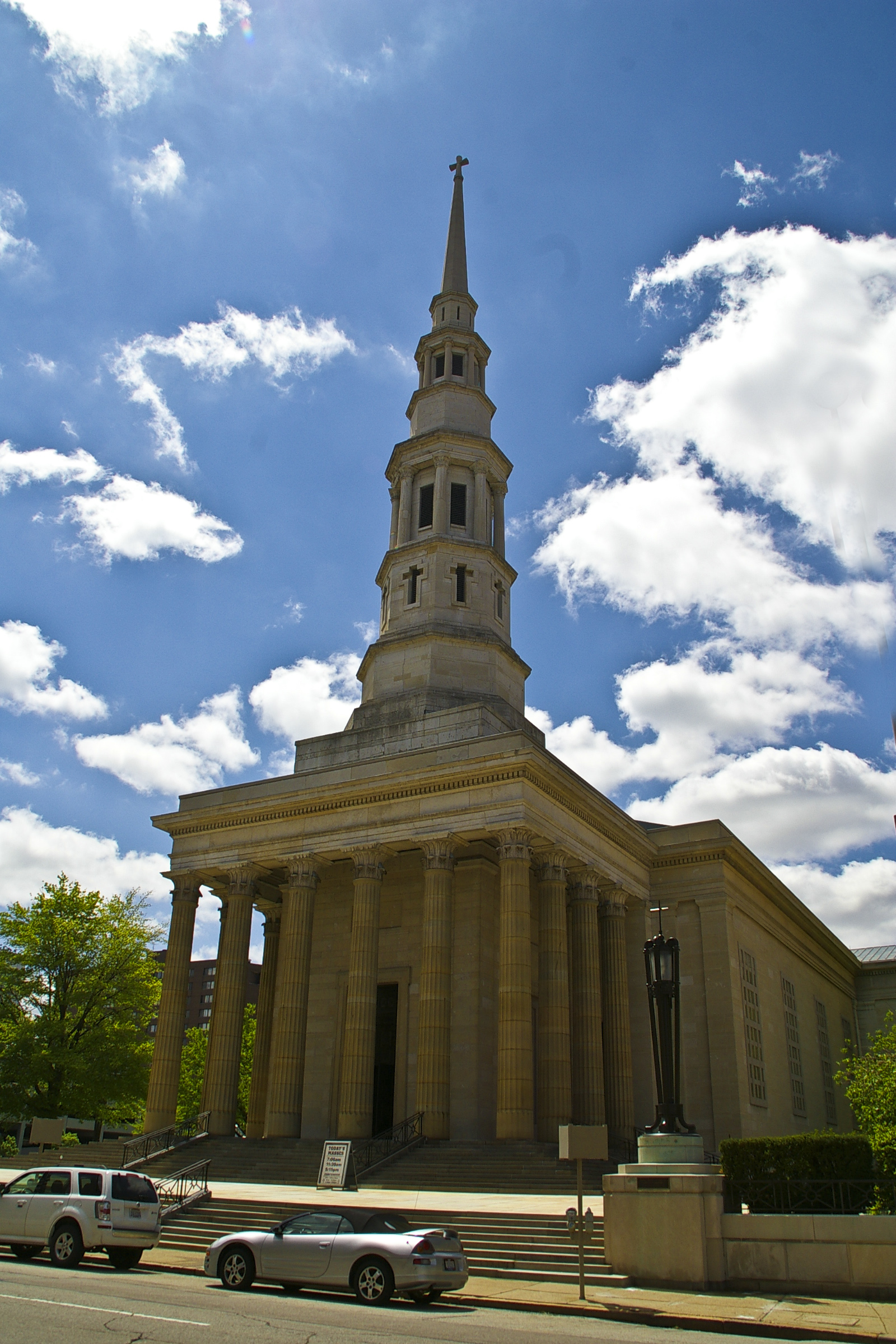
Cathedral Basilica of Saint Peter in Chains

This is a list of churches in the Roman Catholic Archdiocese of Cincinnati. Located in the State of Ohio in the United States, the Archdiocese of Cincinnati covers the southwest region of the state, including the greater Cincinnati and Dayton metropolitan areas. The cathedral church of the archdiocese is the Cathedral Basilica of Saint Peter in Chains in Cincinnati.

Though not part of the archdiocese, the Cincinnati metropolitan area also includes the Cathedral Basilica of the Assumption in Covington, Kentucky, located across the Ohio River from Cincinnati.

== Cincinnati ==
Parish name	Image	Address and neighborhood	Description/sources
All Saints		8939 Montgomery Rd, Cincinnati (Kenwood)	Parish established in 1948; church completed in 1952. Not to be confused with the original All Saints Parish in Cincinnati (1845 to 1936).
Annunciation		3547 Clifton Ave, Cincinnati (Clifton)	Parish established in 1910; present church completed in 1930.
Assumption		7711 Joseph St, Cincinnati (Mt. Healthy)	Parish established in 1954; present church completed in 1979.
Corpus Christi		2014 Springdale Rd, Cincinnati (Mt. Healthy)	Parish established in 1958; present church completed in 1961.
Guardian Angels		6531 Beechmont Ave, Cincinnati (Mt. Washington)	Parish established in 1892; present church completed in 1971.
Holy Cross/Immaculata		30 Guido St, Cincinnati(Mt. Adams)	Immaculata Parish established in 1859, merged with Holy Cross Parish in 1970; church completed in 1860.
Holy Family		814 Hawthorne Ave, Cincinnati (Price Hill)	Parish established in 1884; present church completed in 1917.
Holy Name		2422 Auburn Ave, Cincinnati (Mt. Auburn)	Parish established in 1904.
Holy Trinity		2420 Drex Ave, Cincinnati (Norwood)	Parish established in 1994 with the merger of St. Elizabeth (established in 1884), St. Matthew (church completed in 1922), and Sts. Peter and Paul (church in completed 1940). Congregation worships in the Sts. Peter and Paul Church.
Immaculate Heart of Mary		7820 Beechmont Ave, Cincinnati (Forestville)	Parish established in 1944; present church completed in 1980. Renovated in 2003.
Mother of Christ		5301 Winneste Ave, Cincinnati (Winton Hills)	Parish founded in 1945 for a primarily Black congregation; present church completed in 1965.
Nativity		5935 Pandora Ave, Cincinnati (Pleasant Ridge)	Parish established in 1917; present church completed in 1969.
Old St. Mary's		123 E 13th St, Cincinnati (Over-the-Rhine)	Parish established and church completed in 1841. Oldest continually-used church in Cincinnati; listed on the National Register of Historic Places in 1976.
Our Lady of Lavang		314 Township Ave, Cincinnati (Elmwood Place)	Vietnamese Catholic community in existence since at least 1978. Congregation began worshipping in the former St. Aloysius Church (1889) after its parish disbanded in 1998.
Our Lady of Lourdes		2832 Rosebud Dr, Cincinnati (Covedale)	Parish established in 1927; present church completed in 1967.
Our Lady of the Rosary		17 Farragut Rd, Cincinnati (Greenhills)	Parish established in 1942; present church completed in 1959. Time capsules with memorabilia from original donors are embedded in the church walls.
Our Lady of the Valley		330 W Vine St, Cincinnati (Reading)	Parish established in 2021 with the merger of Sts. Peter and Paul (1850) and Our Lady of the Sacred Heart (1874) Parishes. Congregation worships at Sts. Peter and Paul church, completed in 1860.
Our Lady of the Visitation		3172 South Rd, Cincinnati (Mack)	Parish established in 1946; present church completed in 1962.
Our Lady of Victory		810 Neeb Rd, Cincinnati (Delhi)	Parish established in 1842 as St. Stephen's, renamed Our Lady of Victory in 1853. Current church completed in 1979.
Our Lord, Christ the King		3223 Linwood Ave, Cincinnati (Mt. Lookout)	Parish established in 1926; present church completed in 1957.
Resurrection		1619 California Ave, Cincinnati (Bond Hill)	Parish established in 2010 with the merger of St. Andrew (Avondale), St. Mark (Evanston), St. Agnes (Bond Hill) and St. Martin de Porres (Lincoln Heights) Parishes - all historically Black congregations. Current church, formerly St. Agnes, was completed in 1956.
Resurrection of Our Lord		1750 First Ave, Cincinnati (Price Hill)	Parish established in 1919; present church completed in 1955.
Sacred Heart		2733 Massachusetts Ave, Cincinnati (Camp Washington)	Parish established in 1970 with the merger of the Italian parish of Sacred Heart (1890) and the German parish of Sacred Heart (Camp Washington). The present church, constructed by the German Sacred Heart Parish, was completed in 1889.
St. Aloysius Gonzaga		4366 Bridgetown Rd, Cincinnati (Bridgetown North)	Parish established in 1867; present church completed in 1963.
St. Aloysius on the Ohio		6218 Portage St, Cincinnati (Sayler Park)	Opened in 1868; present church completed in 1888. It is listed on the National Register of Historic Places,
St. Andrew Kim Korean Community		3171 Struble Rd, Cincinnati (Colerain Township)	Parish established in 1994. Current church constructed as a home and/or Protestant church in 1940.
St. Ann		2900 Galbraith Rd, Cincinnati (Groesbeck)	Parish established in 1953 as a replacement for St. Ann parish (1866 to 1938). Present church completed in 1959.
St. Anthony Shrine		5000 Colerain Ave, Cincinnati	
St. Anthony of Padua Maronite		2524 Victory Parkway, Cincinnati (East Walnut Hills)	Parish established in 1910; present church constructed as a synagogue in 1915. Purchased from the Church of Jesus Christ of Latter-day Saints in 1955.
St. Anthony Oratory		6204 Desmond St, Cincinnati (Madisonville)	Present church completed in 1874. May have absorbed St. Margaret-St. John Parish(Fairfax) in 2022.
St. Antoninus		1500 Linneman St, Cincinnati (Covedale)	Parish established and present church completed in 1944.
St. Bartholomew		9375 Winton Rd, Cincinnati (Springfield Township)	
St. Bernard		735 Derby Ave, Cincinnati (Spring Grove Village)	Parish established in 1919; present church completed in 1920.
St. Bernard of Clairvaux		7130 Harrison Ave, Cincinnati (Taylors Creek)	Parish established in 1867; present church completed in 1935.
St. Boniface		1750 Chase Ave, Cincinnati (Northside)	Parish established in 1861 as a mission of St. Aloysius Parish. Present church completed in 1927.
St. Catharine of Siena		2848 Fischer Pl, Cincinnati (Westwood)	Parish established in 1903; present church completed in 1923.
St. Cecilia		3105 Madison Rd, Cincinnati (Oakley)	Parish established in 1908; present church completed in 1928.
St. Clare		1443 Cedar Ave, Cincinnati (College Hill)	Parish established in 1909; present church completed in 1957.
St. Clement		4536 Vine St, Cincinnati(St. Bernard)	Parish established in 1851; present church completed in 1871.
St. Dominic		4551 Delhi Pike, Cincinnati (Delhi)	Parish established in 1933; present church completed in 1957.
St. Francis De Sales		1600 Madison Rd, Cincinnati (East Walnut Hills)	Parish established in 1849; present church completed in 1879. Listed on the National Register of Historic Places in 1973.
St. Francis Seraph		1615 Vine St, Cincinnati(Over-the-Rhine)	Parish established and present church completed in 1859 on the site of the archdiocese's first cathedral, Christ Church.
St. Francis Xavier		611 Sycamore St, Cincinnati (Downtown)	Parish established in 1840; present church completed in 1859 on the site of the archdiocese's second cathedral, St. Peter.
St. Gertrude		6543 Miami Ave, Cincinnati (Madeira)	Mission established in 1923. became a parish in 1944; present church completed in 1961.
St. Ignatius Loyola		5222 North Bend Rd, Cincinnati (Monfort Heights)	Parish established in 1945; present church completed in 1970.
St. James of the Valley		411 Springfield Pike, Cincinnati (Wyoming)	Parish established in the late 19th century. Present church completed in 1940.
St. James the Greater		3565 Hubble Rd, Cincinnati (White Oak)	Parish established in 1840. Present church completed in 1980.
St. Jerome Mission Chapel		131 Rohde Ave, Cincinnati (California)	Parish established in 1863. Present church completed in 1866. Now a mission of Guardian Angels Parish, Cincinnati.
St. John Fisher		3227 Church St, Cincinnati (Newtown)	Parish established in 1947. Present church completed in 2005.
St. John Neumann		12191 Mill Rd, Cincinnati (Pleasant Run Farms)	Parish established in 1978. Present church completed in 1985 and renovated in 1999.
St. John the Baptist		5375 Dry Ridge Rd, Cincinnati (Dry Ridge)	Parish established in 1860. Present church completed in 1997.
St. John the Evangelist		7121 Plainfield Rd, Cincinnati (Deer Park)	Parish established in 1891. Present church completed in 1967.
St. John the Evangelist		9080 Cincinnati Dayton Rd, West Chester	Parish founded in 1880. Present church completed in 1961, renovated and expanded in 1986.
St. Joseph		745 Ezzard Charles Dr, Cincinnati (West End)	Parish founded in 1846. Present church completed in 1965.
St. Jude		5924 Bridgetown Rd, Cincinnati (Bridgetown North)	Parish established in 1956. Current church completed in 1970.
St. Lawrence		3680 Warsaw Ave, Cincinnati (Price Hill)	Parish established in 1870. Present church completed in 1894.
St. Leo the Great		1851 Baltimore Ave, Cincinnati (North Fairmount)	Parish established in 1886. Current church completed in 1911.
St. Monica St. George		328 W. McMillan St, Cincinnati	Serves the Newman Center for the University of Cincinnati
Cathedral Basilica of Saint Peter in Chains		325 Eighth St W, Cincinnati	Dedicated in 1845, it was the first large church west of the Allegheny Mountains. Listed on the National Register of Historic Places
St. Pius X		1662 Blue Rock St, Cincinnati	Dedicated in 1879 as St. Patrick's Church; listed on the National Register of Historic Places
St. Rose		2501 Riverside Dr, Cincinnati	Completed in 1867, listed on the National Register of Historic Places

== Dayton ==
Parish name	Image	Location	Description/sources
Emmanuel Catholic Church		149 Franklin St, Dayton	First Catholic church completed in Dayton in 1837. Was replaced by a new church dedicated in 1873. Andrew Kinninger and Frederick Lampert completed the German gothic structure out of soft brick, trimmed in Dayton limestone. In 1912 a stucco rock façade was installed, but the limestone trim remained. In 1920, the 150-foot rear spire blew down. The church also featured twin spires with two large clocks. Spires removed in 1956 due to wind damage.
Holy Angels		1322 Brown St, Dayton	Parish established in 1901; present church completed in 1927.
Holy Cross Lithuanian		1924 Leo St, Dayton	Parish established in 1914; present church completed in 1915.
Holy Family Catholic Church		140 S Findlay St, Dayton	Parish established in 1905; church completed in 1925. The only church in the archdiocese that solely offers Latin Mass.
Holy Trinity		272 Bainbridge St, Dayton	Oldest-standing Catholic church in Dayton. Parish established in 1859. Church dedicated on in 1861. Main steeple completed in 1868.
Immaculate Conception Chapel		300 College Park, Dayton	Serves the University of Dayton
Incarnation		7415 Far Hills Dr, Dayton	Parish established in 1945; present church completed in 1970.
Our Lady of Grace		527 Forest Ave and 533 Odlin Ave, Dayton	Parish established in 2014 with the merger of Corpus Christi (1911) and Our Lady of Mercy (1928) Parishes, as well as the remnants of the Assumption (1959) and St. Agnes (1915) Parishes. The congregation worships in the Corpus Christi (1911) and Our Lady of Mercy (1929) Churches.
Our Lady of the Immaculate Conception		2300 S Smithville Rd, Dayton	Parish established in 1948; present church completed in 1966.
Our Lady of the Rosary		22 Notre Dame Ave, Dayton	Parish established and present church completed in 1888.
Precious Blood		4961 Salem Ave, Dayton	Parish established in 1950, present church completed in 2000.
Sacred Heart Vietnamese Community		217 W Fourth St, Dayton	Parish established in 2001; present church completed in 1895 by the former Sacred Heart parish (1883–1996).
St. Adalbert Polish		1511 Valley St, Dayton	
St. Anthony of Padua		830 Bowen St, Dayton	Parish established in 1913; present church completed in 1954.
St. Barbara the Great Byzantine Community		3650 Colonel Glenn Hwy, Fairborn	Congregation worships in the St. John Bosco Chapel at Wright State University.
St. Benedict the Moor		519 Liscum Dr, Dayton	Historically Black parish established in 2005 with the merger of St. James and Resurrection Parishes.
St. Francis of Assisi		6245 Wilmington Pike, Dayton	Parish established in 1969; present church completed in 2004.
St. Helen		605 Granville Pl, Dayton	Parish established in 1953; present church completed in 1966, renovated in 1977 and 2003.
St. Henry		6696 N Springboro Pike, Dayton	Parish established in 1960; present church completed in 1980.
St. Ignatius of Antioch Maronite		50 Nutt Rd, Dayton	Parish established in 1993. Present church, completed in 1967, purchased from Christ the King Lutheran Church (NALC) in 2019.
St. Joseph		411 E 2nd St, Dayton	Parish founded in 1846, Italian-Byzantine style church completed in 1911.
St. Leonard Faith Community		8100 Clyo Rd, Dayton	Franciscan congregation associated with CHI Living Communities, a retirement home. Congregation worships in the former St. Leonard Franciscan Seminary chapel.
St. Mary		543 Xenia Ave, Dayton	
St. Peter		6161 Chambersburg Rd, Huber Heights	
St. Rita		5401 N Main St, Dayton	Parish established in 1921, church completed in 1967
Queen of Apostles		4435 E Patterson Rd, Dayton	Non-territorial, Marianist parish established in 1973; congregation worships at Mount St. John Queen of Apostles Chapel.
Queen of Martyrs		4134 Cedar Ridge Rd, Dayton	

== Other cities ==
Name	Image	Location	Description/sources
Ascension		2025 Woodman Dr, Kettering	Parish established in 1955; present church completed in 1988.
Holy Angels		324 S Ohio Ave, Sidney	Present church completed in 1892.
Holy Trinity (Holy Family Parish)		201 Clark St, Middletown	Parish established in 1991 with the merger of Holy Trinity (1852), St. John (1872), and St. Mary (1847) Parishes; celebrates masses at Holy Trinity Church (1899) and St. John Church (1927).
Saint John (Holy Family Parish)		1405 1st Avenue, Middletown	Parish established in 1991 with the merger of Holy Trinity (1852), St. John (1872), and St. Mary (1847) Parishes; celebrates masses at Holy Trinity Church (1899) and St. John Church (1927).
Holy Family		11255 OH-185, Versailles	Parish established in 1846; present church completed in 1866. Oldest church in Darke county in continuous use.
Holy Name of Jesus		222 Hamilton Ave, Trenton	Parish established in 1891; church completed in 1961.
Holy Redeemer		120 S Eastmoor Dr, New Bremen	Parish established in 1872; present church completed in 1970.
Holy Rosary		511 E Spring St, St. Marys	Parish established in 1852; Present church completed in 1979.
Holy Trinity		Batavia	
Holy Trinity		120 E Main St,Coldwater	Parish established in 1867; present church completed in 1899.
Holy Trinity		612 E Mulberry St, West Union	
Immaculate Conception		229 W Anthony St, Celina	Parish established in 1865; present church completed in 1903.
Immaculate Conception		116 N Mill St, Botkins	Parish established in 1865; present church completed in 1961.
Immaculate Conception		200 Clay St, Bradford	Parish established in 1875; present church completed in 1925.
Immaculate Conception		164 W Elm St, North Lewisburg	Parish established in 1863; present church completed in 1869.
Mary, Help of Christians		954 N Maple Ave, Fairborn	Parish established 1862, present church completed in 1970.
Mary, Help of Christians		403 Sharpsburg Rd, Fort Recovery	Parish established in 1881; present church completed in 1977.
Nativity of the Blessed Virgin Mary		State Route 119, Cassella	
Nativity of the Blessed Virgin Mary		6524 OH-119, Maria Stein	Parish formed in 1847; present church completed in 1858.
Our Lady of Good Hope		6 South 3rd St, Miamisburg	Parish established as St. Michael's in 1852. Present church completed in 1956.
Our Lady of Guadalupe		6701 OH-219, Montezuma	Present church completed in 1960.
Our Lady of Sorrows		330 Lebanon St, Monroe	Parish established in 1869 as Holy Trinity, then Our Lady of Seven Dolors, then finally Our Lady of Sorrows; present church completed in 1886 and rebuilt in 1942 following a fire.
Our Lady of Victory		810 Neeb Rd,Delhi Township	
Precious Blood		35 South Maple St, Chickasaw	Parish established in 1903. Present church completed in 1967.
Queen of Peace		2550 Millville Ave, Hamilton	Parish established in 1941.
Sacred Heart		9377 OH-119, Anna(McCartyville)	Parish established in 1882; present church completed in 2007.
Sacred Heart		209 West Lake Ave, New Carlisle	Parish established in 1950; present church completed in 2005.
Sacred Heart		121 E. Walnut Street, St. Paris	First resident pastor appointed in 1954. Present church completed in 1882.
St. Albert the Great		3033 Far Hills Ave, Kettering	Parish established in 1939.
St. Aloysius		6036 OH-274, Celina(Carthagena)	Parish established in 1860; present church completed in 1878.
St. Aloysius		3350 Chapel Rd, Okeana(Shandon)	Parish established in 1868; present church completed in 1984.
St. Andrew		552 Main St, Milford	Parish established in 1853; present church completed in 1923.
St. Angela Merici		130 Stone Alley, Fayetteville	Parish established in 2003 with the merger of St. Patrick and St. Martin Parishes. Mass is celebrated in the former St. Patrick church.
St. Ann		3000 Pleasant Ave, Hamilton	Parish established in 1908; present church completed in 1938.
St. Ann		370 South 5th St, Williamsburg	Parish established in 1947.
St. Anthony		471 St. Anthony Rd, Fort Recovery	Parish established in 1852; present church completed in 1874.
St. Anthony		State Rt. 49 & St. Anthony Rd, Padua	
St. Augustine		6931 Weaver Rd, Germantown	Parish established in 1940; present church completed in 1963.
St. Augustine		44 East Washington St, Jamestown	
St. Augustine		48 North Hanover St, Minster	Parish established in 1836; present church completed in 1848. Twin steeples added in 1876.
St. Augustine		5717 Lytle Rd, Waynesville	
St. Benignus		204 S 2nd St, Greenfield	Parish established in 1856; present church building is a former Methodist church, purchased in 1904.
St. Bernadette		1479 Locust Lake Rd, Amelia	Parish established in 1950; present church completed in 2009.
St. Bernard		272 Main St, New Weston(Burkettsville)	Parish established in 1874.
St. Bernard		910 Lagonda Ave, Springfield	Parish established as a mission of St. Raphael Parish (Springfield) in 1860; church completed in 1870.
St. Boniface		310 S Downing St, Piqua	Parish established in 1855; present church completed in 1865.
St. Brigid		312 Fairground Rd, Xenia	Parish established in 1849; original church completed in 1852, destroyed by tornado in 1974. Current church completed in 1977.
St. Charles Borromeo		31 S Chillicothe St, South Charleston	Present church completed in 1905.
St. Charles Borromeo		4500 Ackerman Blvd, Kettering	Parish established in 1962; present church completed in 1993.
St. Christopher		435 E National Rd, Vandalia	Parish established in 1957; present church completed in 1994.
St. Columban		894 Oakland Rd, Loveland	Parish established in 1893; present church completed in 2002.
St. Columbkille		73 North Mulberry St, Wilmington	Parish established in 1870; present church completed in 1919.
St. Denis		14 East Woods St, Versailles	Parish established in 1888, present church completed in 1962.
St. Elizabeth Ann Seton		5900 Buckwheat Rd, Milford	Parish established in 1976 as a mission of St. Andrew Parish in Milford; present church completed in 1988.
St. Francis		1509 Cranberry Rd, St. Henry	Founded in 1856 as a mission of St. Henry Parish; present church completed in 1906.
St. Francis de Sales		20 Desales Ave, Lebanon	Parish established around 1883; present church completed in 2013.
St. Gabriel		48 West Sharon Ave, Glendale	Parish established in 1859; present church completed in 1907.
St. George		509 East State St, Georgetown	Parish established in 1902.
St. Henry		272 E. Main St, St. Henry	Parish established in 1839; present church completed in 1897.
St. John		11319 Van Buren St, Wapokoneta(Fryburg)	Parish established in 1848, present church completed in 1850.
St. John the Baptist		10010 Carolina Trace Rd, Harrison	Parish established in 1851. Present church completed in 2019.
St. John the Baptist		8533 OH-119, Maria Stein	Parish formed in 1837; present church completed in 1888. Church destroyed by fire in 2025.
St. John the Baptist		753 S. Hyatt St, Tipp City	Parish founded in 1856; present church completed in 1998.
St. John the Evangelist		400 N Spring St, New Paris	Parish established in 1854. Current church completed in 1960.
St. Joseph		State Route 364 and Minster Road, Egypt	Parish established in 1852 as a mission of St. Augustine Parish, Minster. Present church completed in 1887.
St. Joseph		1689 St Joe Rd, Fort Recovery	Parish established in 1839. Present church completed in 1861, remodeled from 1918 to 1920.
St. Joseph		171 Washington St, Hamilton	Parish established and present church completed in 1867.
St. Joseph		25 E Harrison Ave, North Bend	Parish established in 1860. Original church completed in 1887. Present church completed in 1962. New sanctuary completed in 2015.
St. Joseph		802 Kenton St, Springfield	Parish established as mission of St. Raphael parish (Springfield) in 1883. Present church completed in 1897.
St. Joseph		309 S Pearl St, Wapokoneta	Parish established in 1839. Present church completed in 1911.
St. Julie Billiart		224 Dayton St, Hamilton	Parish established in 1989 with the merger of St. Stephen, St. Mary, and St. Veronica Parishes, all of Hamilton. Current church, formerly St. Stephen, was completed in 1854, placed on the National Register of Historic Places in 1982, and renovated in 1992.
St. Lawrence		16053 Botkins Rd, Botkins (Rhine)	Parish established in 1856. Present church completed in 1894.
St. Louis		210 N Broadway St,Owensville	Parish established in 1856; original church completed in 1857 and destroyed by fire. Current church completed in 1920.
St. Louis		15 E Star Rd,Rossburg (North Star)	Parish established as St. John in 1892. Present church completed in 1914.
St. Luke		1440 N Fairfield Rd, Beavercreek	Founded in 1955, present church consecrated in 2003
St. Mary		228 Washington Ave, Urbana	Founded in 1853, present church consecrated in 1966
St. Mary of the Woods		464 Madison Ave, Russells Point	
St. Michael		40 Walnut St, Mechanicsburg	Founded in 1865, present church dedicated in 1888
St. Nicholas		State Rt. 705 & Washington St, Osgood	Founded in 1906
St. Patrick		316 E Patterson Ave, Bellefontaine	
St. Patrick		6959 Glynwood Rd, St Marys	
St. Patrick		Hoying and Wright-Puthoff Rds, St. Patrick	
St. Paul		1000 Wenger Rd, Englewood	Parish established in 1972, church completed in 1973
St. Paul		308 Phillips St, Yellow Springs	
St. Peter In Chains		382 Liberty Avenue, Hamilton	Parish was established in 1893. Present church completed in 1963
St. Philomena		5236 Stonelick Williams Corner Rd, Batavia	Parish established in 1839. Oldest Catholic church in Clermont County
St. Raphael		225 E. High St, Springfield	
St. Remy		108 E. Main St,Russia	Founded as a mission in the 1840s, became a parish in 1850, present church completed in 1890
St. Rose		Main St, St. Rose	
St. Teresa of the Child Jesus		1827 N Limestone St, Springfield	Founded in 1931, current church dedicated in 1965
St. Teresa of the Infant Jesus		6925 US-36, Covington	
St. Sebastian		Sebastian	
St. Wendelin		2980 Fort Recovery-Minster Rd, St Henry	

== Former churches ==
Name	Image	Location	Description/sources
All Saints		Cincinnati	
Assumption of the Blessed Virgin Mary		2622 Gilbert Ave, Cincinnati (Walnut Hills)	Originally an Irish congregation. Church completed in 1885. Closed in 1998.
Holy Cross		Cincinnati (Mt. Adams)	Closed in 1970.
Holy Trinity		Cincinnati	Founded in 1834 as the first parish for German immigrants in Cincinnati. Closed in 1958
St. Andrew		Cincinnati (Avondale)	Founded in 1874 for Irish immigrants, church dedicated in 1920, closed in 2010.
St. Augustine		923 Bank St, Cincinnati	Founded in 1852, church consecrated in 1944, closed in 1978
St. George		42 Calhoun St, Cincinnati	Founded in 1868, church dedicated in 1874, closed in 1993
St. Mary		Hamilton	Founded in 1848, first church completed in 1860
St. Michael the Archangel		2110 St. Michael St, Cincinnati	Founded in 1847, church completed in 1848. Closed in 1998
St. Paul		Cincinnati	
Sts. Peter and Paul		Petersburg Cemetery on Santa Fe-New Knoxville Rd, Wapakoneta (Petersburg)	Parish founded in 1835. Mother church of St. Joseph (Wapakoneta); St. John the Evangelist, (Fryburg); St. Lawrence, (Rhine); and Our Lady of the Immaculate Conception (Botkins) Parishes. Parish dissolved in 1897 and its 1869 log church with it.
St. Philomena		619 E Third St, Cincinnati	Founded in 1839, church dedicated in 1905.
St. Stephen		1114 Troy St. Dayton	Founded as a mission of Holy Name Parish to serve Hungarian immigrants. Church completed in 1952, now vacant.
St. Veronica		Hamilton	Founded in 1894
Our Lady of Perpetual Help		Cincinnati (Sedamsville)	
