= Antony Sumich =

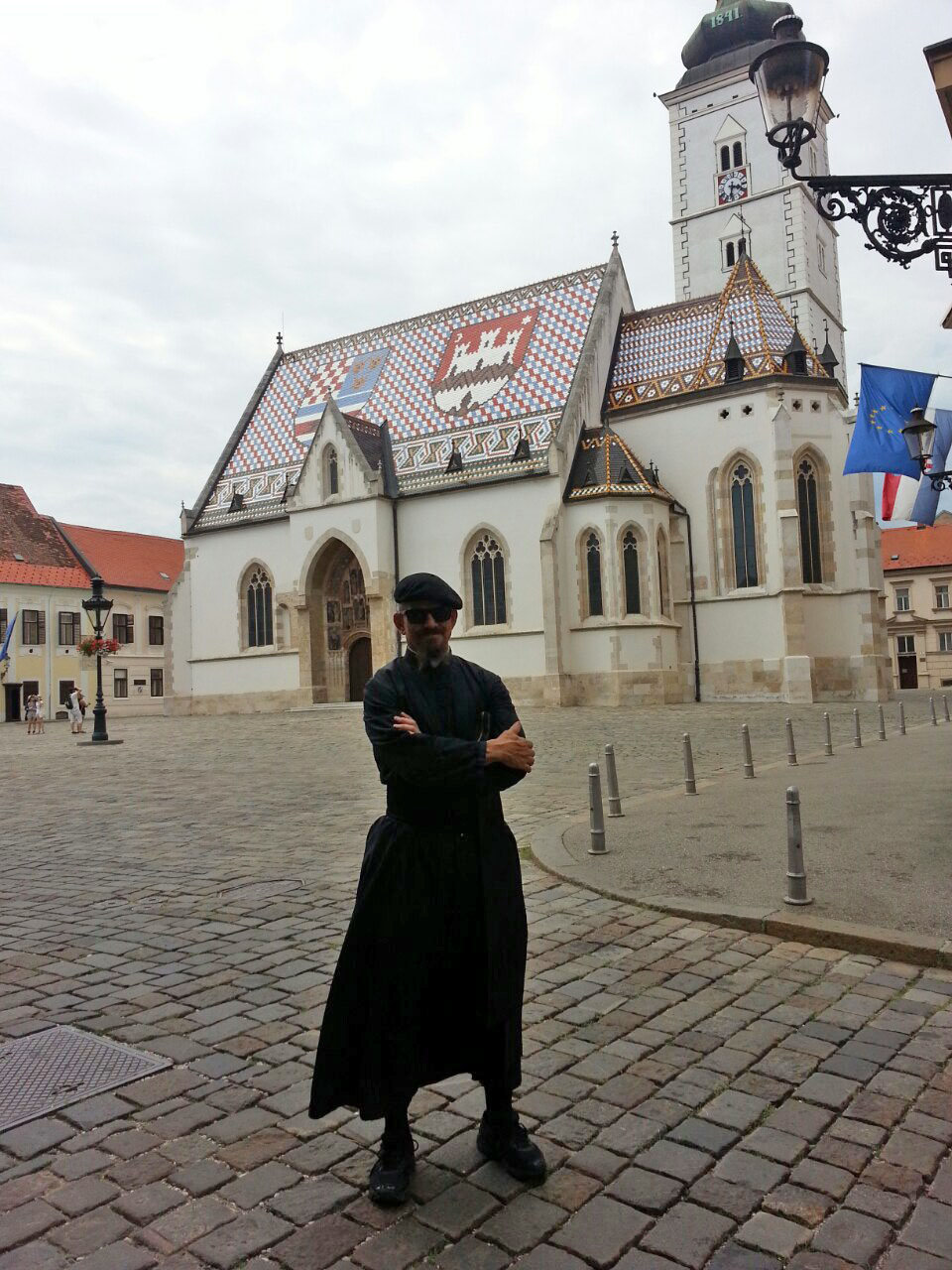
- Sumich at St. Mark's Square and its eponymous church in Zagreb, Croatia, July 2016.
- Born: Antony Sumich; 30 September 1964 (age 62) Auckland, New Zealand

Rugby union career
- Position: –
International career
Years	Team	Apps	(Points)
- Croatia
Coaching career
- Years: Team
- Croatia

Antony Sumich FSSP (born 30 September 1964 in Auckland, New Zealand) is a former international rugby union and cricket player for Croatia, skiing instructor and rugby coach, and is now a Catholic priest of the Priestly Fraternity of Saint Peter.

== Background and sport ==
Sumich was educated at St Peter's College, Auckland, and completed his training as a civil engineer in Auckland in the 1980s. In 1989, he moved to Europe intending to live in his ancestral Croatia, but because of the war he went to Austria and worked there eight winters as a ski instructor, and elsewhere in Europe coaching rugby. After the war, he became coach of the Croatian national rugby team. He also played cricket for Croatia, being a member of the Croatian National Cricket team in 2001.

== Developing his faith ==
When the war had finished and Sumich returned to Croatia, he found a “flourishing faith”. He observer “They had broken free from communism and the Church was free…Everyone had rosaries in their pockets.” Sumich found himself “practising as a Catholic for the first time in my life, as distinct from just going to Sunday Mass. He wanted to know more about the Faith, because I'd just forgotten everything.” His mother sent him a copy of the Catechism of the Catholic Church, then he “sat down on a beach and read” the book over one summer, realising “It all made sense.” He started going to frequent Confession and “finding a sense of shame which probably hadn't existed before.” At age 34, Sumich set aside a year, praying intensely, including the 15 prayers of St Bridget of Sweden and the Rosary. At this time, he was coach of the Croatian rugby team. “We would be playing at the Hong Kong Sevens and my rosary [beads] would be in my pocket and I would finger it.” Sumich liked to challenge his players: “I would say to them, ‘strong moral life, strong character on the rugby field; weak moral life, and you are the first one to chuck the towel in when the going gets tough’.”

Returning to New Zealand, Sumich found local liturgies very different from what he had become used to in Croatia, but in Auckland, he was introduced to the “awe-inspiring” Tridentine Mass celebrated by Denzil Meuli at Titirangi. Sumich said he “felt God's call and sought an order using this rite”, and was accepted by the Priestly Fraternity of Saint Peter. He went to their formation house, the International Seminary of St. Peter in Wigratzbad-Opfenbach, Bavaria, but did most of his studies in Denton, Nebraska at Our Lady of Guadalupe Seminary, where he was ordained deacon in March 2008.

== Priesthood ==
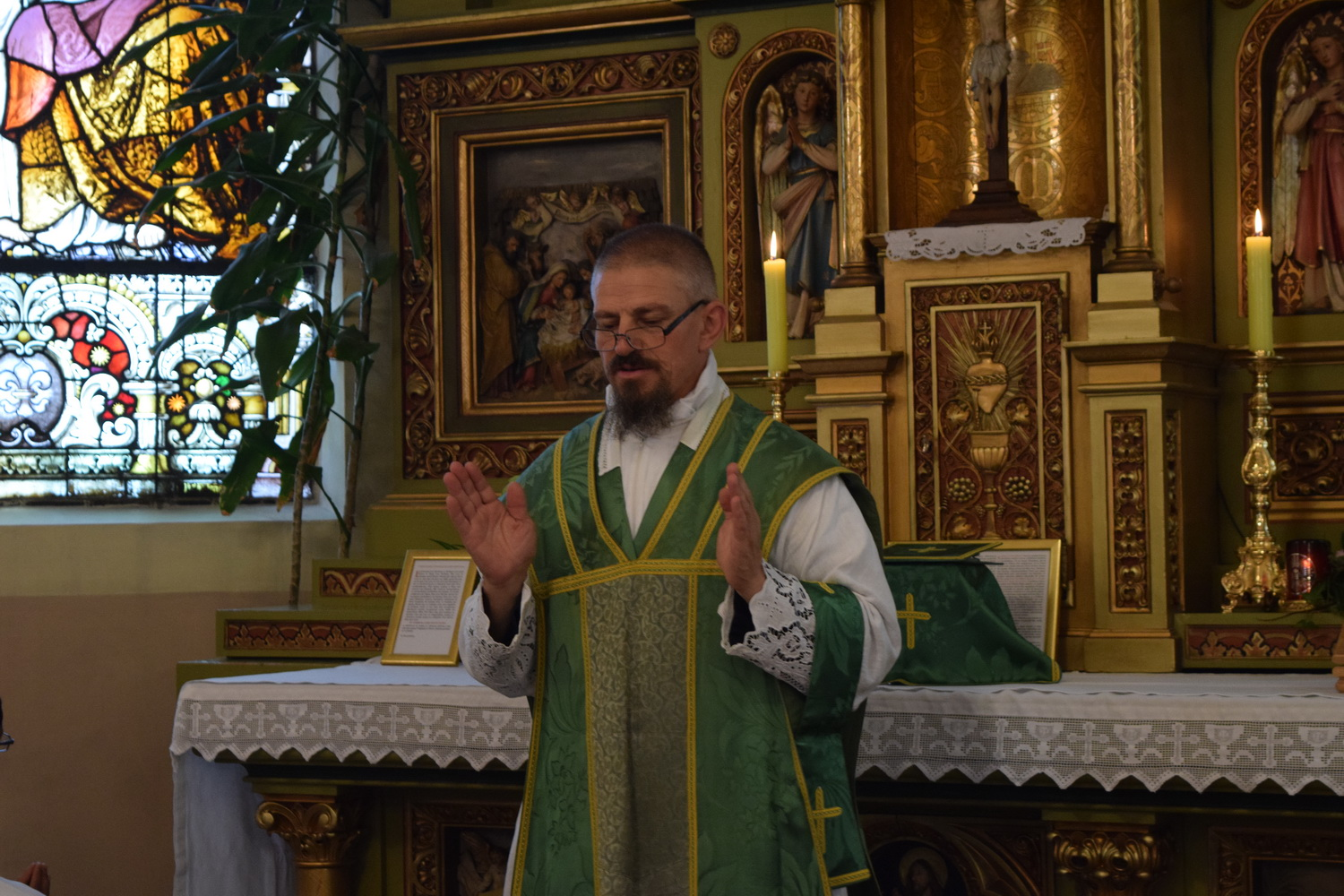
Sumich offering the Tridentine Mass in Zagreb.

Sumich was ordained a priest on 29 November 2008, at St Michael’s Church, Remuera, Auckland, by Basil Meeking, Bishop Emeritus of Christchurch, using the 1962 Roman Missal and Rite of Ordination. He said his first Mass on the First Sunday of Advent (30 November 2008), and is the first New Zealander ordained in the Priestly Fraternity of St Peter. After his priestly ordination he was stationed in Orlu, Nigeria, where he had also served after his ordination as deacon. In 2011, Sumich was made Rector of St. Gregory's Academy, a Catholic boarding school in Elmhurst, Pennsylvania. Sumich served as associate pastor for the Latin Mass community at St. Anthony’s Parish in Calgary, Alberta, Canada. in 2016, he returned to New Zealand to serve the Latin Mass community of West Auckland in Titirangi and Te Atatū South.
