= Men's colleges in the United States =

College in United States

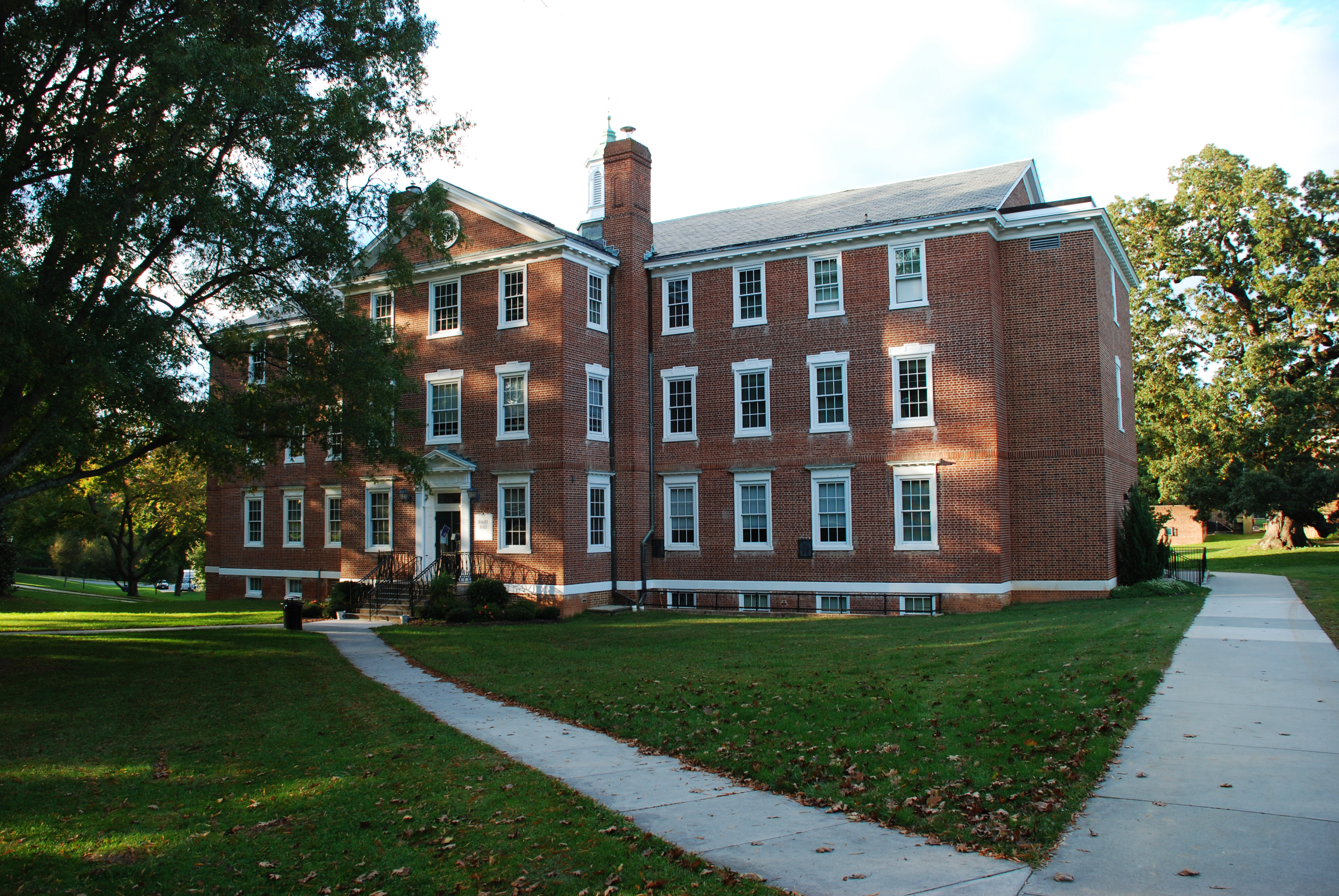
Hampden–Sydney College, founded in 1775, is the oldest of only three non-religious, four-year, all-male colleges in the U.S.

Men's colleges in the United States are primarily, though not exclusively, those categorized as being undergraduate, bachelor's degree-granting single-sex institutions that admit only men. In the United States, male-only undergraduate higher education was the norm until the 1960s. The few remaining well-known men's colleges are traditional independent liberal arts colleges, though at present the majority are preparatory institutions for religious vocations, primarily in the Roman Catholic and Orthodox Jewish traditions which permit only male clergy.

There are currently three non-religious, four-year, all-male colleges in the United States: Hampden–Sydney College, Morehouse College, and Wabash College. There is also currently one religious, four-year, all-male college in the U.S. that is not a seminary: namely Saint John’s University.

== History ==
Historically, most colleges in the United States were gender-segregated. Alfred University in upstate New York was founded in 1836 as a co-educational institution. Northwestern University and Washington University in St. Louis were some of the first men's colleges to begin admitting women, both doing so in 1869. However, mixed-sex education did not become the norm until much later. Some colleges, such as Wesleyan University began to admit women in 1872, but abandoned the practice in 1912, when it became all-male once again, and would not admit women again until 1972.

By the mid-1960s to early-1970s, most of the remaining male-only institutions began to admit women at the undergraduate level, including Georgetown University (1969), Princeton University (1969), Johns Hopkins University (1970) and Yale University (1969). Claremont McKenna College, then Claremont Men's College, started admitting women in 1976 after being founded as a men's college for World War II veterans on the G.I. Bill. Haverford College admitted its first female students in 1980 and Columbia College of Columbia University held out even longer, not admitting women until 1983. By that point, most men's colleges had already disappeared from the American academic landscape.

In 1990, Virginia Military Institute (VMI), then still all male, was sued by the U.S. Department of Justice for discrimination. The Department of Justice argued that since VMI was a public institution, it could not prevent women from attending based on gender alone. Due to United States v. Virginia, VMI admitted its first female cadets in 1997.

At Tulane University, Tulane College was for men and H. Sophie Newcomb Memorial College was for women. The two merged in 2006 due to the financial devastation to the university after Hurricane Katrina.

Deep Springs College in California, a small two-year school with approximately two dozen students, began admitting women in 2018.

== Current men's colleges in the United States ==
=== Four-year ===
As of 2026, there are three private, non-religious, four-year, all-male college institutions in the United States. These are:

Name	Location	Year Founded	Number of Students	Endowment Size
Hampden–Sydney College	Hampden Sydney, Virginia	1775	993	$258 million
Morehouse College	Atlanta, Georgia	1867	2,260	$186 million
Wabash College	Crawfordsville, Indiana	1832	835	$385.2 million

In April 2019, Morehouse announced that it would begin admitting transgender men for the first time in 2020, becoming the first standalone all-male college in the U.S. to adopt a policy allowing transgender students.

As a member of Atlanta University Center, Morehouse has extensive cross-registration and resource sharing with Spelman College (all women) and Clark Atlanta University (coeducational).

The student senate of Wabash College most recently voted against allowing transgender students in 2016.

Hampden–Sydney provides a female-only guest house on its campus for female visitors.

=== Two-year men's colleges ===
Although it now offers associate's degrees, the Williamson College of the Trades in Media, Pennsylvania was established as a free vocational school and is usually not considered a traditional men's college, although it is a non-denominational independent institution that enrolls no women. Taking inspiration from Williamson, the Harmel Academy was opened in 2020 as a Catholic vocational school for men.

=== Counterparts and coordinates ===
A few men's colleges exist as components of a larger co-educational institution or partnership. Such arrangements were formerly much more common, but most ended with a merger or with one or both institutions becoming co-educational in the second half of the twentieth century.

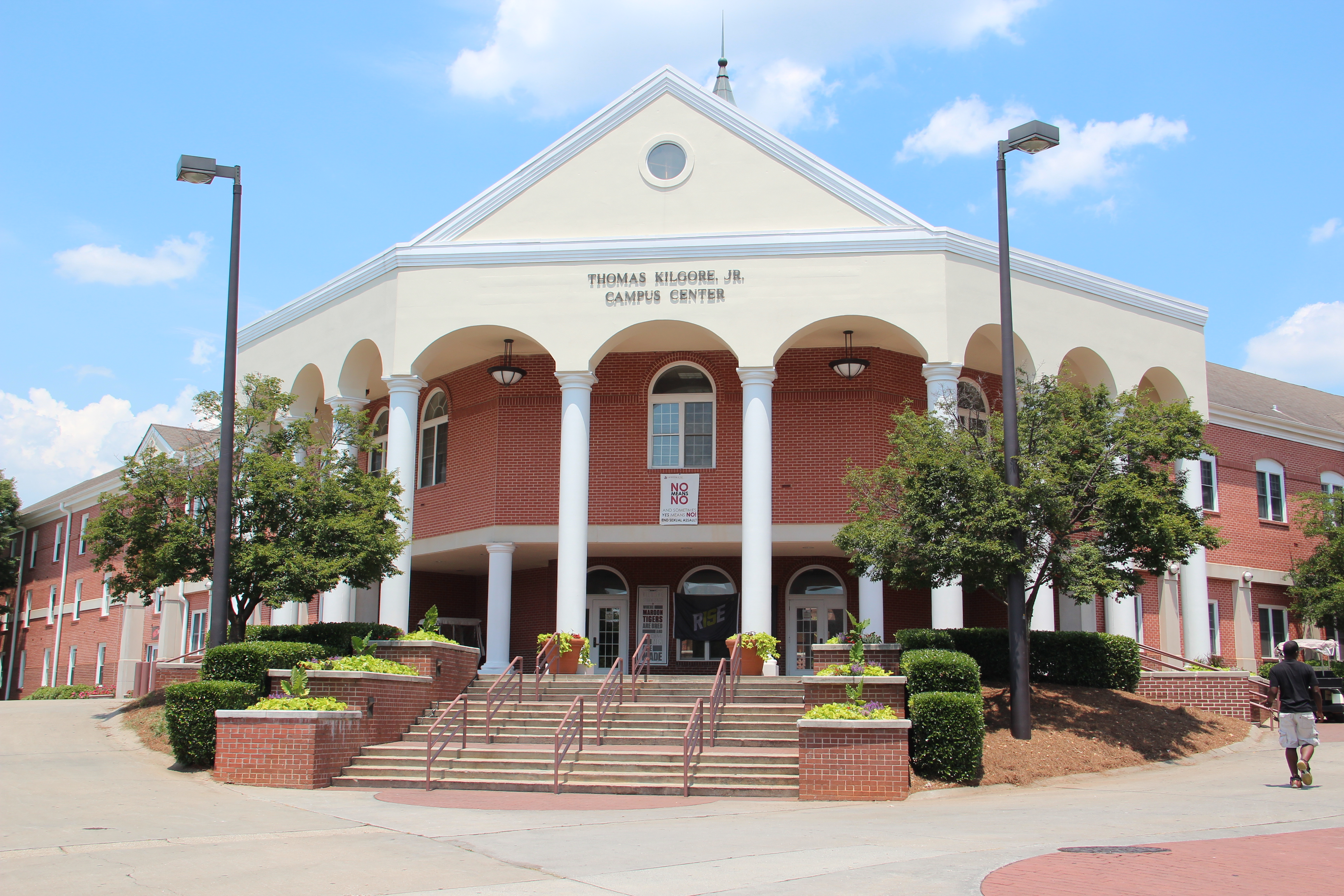
Morehouse College is the nation's only historically Black men's college and the largest of the three private, non-religious, four-year, all-male colleges in the U.S.

Some universities separate their undergraduate students into individual, gender-conscious colleges. Yeshiva University oversees the all-male Yeshiva College as well as the Stern College for Women. The University of Richmond has Richmond College for men and Westhampton College for women. In each of these cases, the individual colleges have their own residence systems, advisors, staff, student governments, and traditions separate from their male or female counterpart.

There is also the type of men's colleges that are formally independent but have close academic relationships with women's colleges on adjacent campuses, as is the case of the College of Saint Benedict and Saint John's University in St. Joseph and Collegeville, Minnesota, respectively. In addition, since 2023, non-binary students can attend either institution, and transgender students have been officially permitted since 2016.

Unlike the single-sex colleges at Yeshiva and Richmond, the College of Saint Benedict and Saint John's University are not considered to be two colleges within one larger university, but instead two independent colleges joined in a partnership arrangement. However, there is one president that oversees both institutions.

== Christian seminaries ==
=== Reformed Baptist ===
- The Master's Seminary (Sun Valley, California) - They also have a Women’s Ministries Certificate of Achievement that is open both to undergraduate students and lay members of the community, out of a desire to "train women for ministry in accordance with the model set by Titus 2, where older women are called to train younger women."

=== Catholic ===
While some Roman Catholic seminaries offer degrees limited to men, often, but not necessarily the MDiv, as of 2025, a number of Roman Catholic seminaries in the United States offer degrees to women, and are thus no longer exclusively colleges for men only.

This is not an exhaustive list of Roman Catholic seminaries in the United States, but instead only includes institutions that are confirmed to offer degrees exclusively to men. Minor seminaries generally confer degrees at the associate's level before students transfer to other institutions for further study.

=== Archdiocesan ===
==== California ====
- St. Patrick Seminary (Menlo Park) – governed by the Archdiocese of San Francisco; opened in 1898.
- Blessed Junipero Serra House of Formation (Grand Terrace, California) – operated by the Diocese of San Bernardino; opened in 1995.

==== District of Columbia ====
- Saint John Paul II Seminary – under the Archdiocese of Washington; opened in 2011 (website: Saint John Paul II Seminary - Washington, DC)
- Theological College – run by the Society of Saint Sulpice; opened in 1917.

==== Florida ====
- St. John Vianney College Seminary (Miami) – run by the Archdiocese of Miami; founded in 1959

==== Maryland ====
- Mount St. Mary's Seminary (Emmitsburg) – the largest seminary in the country, Archdiocesan; opened in 1808.
- St. Mary's Seminary (Baltimore) – Archdiocesan seminary and run by the Society of Saint Sulpice; opened in 1791.

==== Massachusetts ====
- Pope St. John XXIII National Seminary (Weston) – Archdiocesan seminary for adult vocations; opened in 1964.

==== Minnesota ====
- Immaculate Heart of Mary Seminary (Winona) – opened in 1948.
- St. John Vianney College Seminary (St. Paul)

==== Missouri ====
- Kenrick–Glennon Seminary (Shrewsbury, St. Louis County) – run by the Archdiocese of Saint Louis; founded in 1898.

==== Nebraska ====
- St. Gregory the Great Seminary (Seward) – opened in 1998

==== Rhode Island ====
- Our Lady of Providence Seminary (Providence, Rhode Island) – opened in 1942.

==== Texas ====
- Assumption Seminary (San Antonio) – Archdiocesan seminary; established in 1915.
- Holy Trinity Seminary (Irving) – established in 1964.
- St. Charles Seminary (Texas) (El Paso)
- St. Mary Seminary (Houston) – Archdiocesan seminary.

==== Wisconsin ====
- Saint Francis de Sales Seminary (Milwaukee) – Archdiocesan seminary; opened in 1845.

==== Redemptoris Mater Seminaries ====
Archdiocesan seminaries consisting of vocations from the Neocatechumenal Way located in:

- Chestnut Hill, Massachusetts – Opened 2005.
- Dallas
- Denver – Opened in 1996.
- Miami – Opened 2011.
- Washington, DC – Opened in 2001.

==== Minor Seminaries ====
- The College Seminary of the Immaculate Conception at St. Andrew's Hall (South Orange, New Jersey) – Located at Seton Hall University.
- St. Paul Seminary (Pittsburgh, Pennsylvania) – Diocese of Pittsburgh.
- St. Thomas Seminary (Bloomfield, Connecticut) – Archdiocese of Hartford; opened in 1897.

=== Religious Orders ===
==== Benedictine ====
- Conception Seminary College (Conception, Missouri) – Opened in 1886.
- Saint Joseph Seminary College (St. Benedict, Louisiana) – Opened in 1891.
- Mount Angel Seminary (St. Benedict, Oregon) – Opened in 1889.

==== Order of Preachers (Dominicans) ====
- Dominican House of Studies – Run by the Dominican Friars; opened in 1905.

==== Franciscans ====
- San Antonio de Padua Seminary (El Paso) – Theological seminary for the Mexican province.

==== Institute of the Incarnate Word ====
- Fulton Sheen House of Formation (Chillum, Maryland) – Opened in 1998.

==== Legionaries of Christ ====
- Novitiate and College of Humanities of the Legionaries of Christ (Cheshire, Connecticut)
- Sacred Heart Apostolic School (Rolling Prairie, Indiana) – opened in 2005.

==== Oblates of the Virgin Mary ====
- Our Lady of Grace Seminary (Boston) – Opened in 1978.

==== Priestly Fraternity of Saint Peter ====
- Our Lady of Guadalupe Seminary (Denton, Nebraska) – Opened in 2000.

=== Eastern Catholic Churches ===
==== Ukrainian Greek Catholic Church ====
- St. Basil College Seminary (Stamford, Connecticut)

=== Russian Orthodox Church Outside of Russia ===
- Holy Trinity Orthodox Seminary (Jordanville, New York) - Although the degrees offered by the seminary are only open to men, there is a Certificate of Theological Studies that is open to women.

== Jewish seminaries ==
=== California ===
- Yeshiva Ohr Elchonon Chabad/West Coast Talmudical Seminary (Los Angeles)

=== Colorado ===
- Yeshiva Toras Chaim Talmudical Seminary (Denver)

=== Florida ===
- Talmudic University of Florida (Miami Beach)

=== Illinois ===
- Telshe Yeshiva-Chicago (Chicago)

=== Maryland ===
- Ner Israel Rabbinical College (Baltimore)
- Yeshiva College of the Nation's Capital (Silver Spring)

=== Michigan ===
- Yeshiva Gedolah of Greater Detroit (Oak Park)
- Yeshiva Beth Yehuda Kollel (Southfield)

=== New Jersey ===
- Talmudical Academy of New Jersey (Adelphia)
- Beth Medrash Govoha (Lakewood)
- Rabbinical College of America (Morristown)

=== New York ===
- Beth Hamedrash Shaarei Yosher Institute (Brooklyn)
- Beth Hatalmud Rabbinical College (Brooklyn)
- Central Yeshiva Tomchei Tmimim-Lubavitch (Brooklyn)
- Darkei Noam Rabbinical College (Brooklyn)
- Kehilath Yakov Rabbinical Seminary (Brooklyn)
- Machzikei Hadath Rabbinical College (Brooklyn)
- Mesivta Torah Vodaath Seminary (Brooklyn)
- Mirrer Yeshiva Central Institute (Brooklyn)
- Rabbinical Academy Mesivta Rabbi Chaim Berlin (Brooklyn)
- Rabbinical College Bobover Yeshiva B'nei Zion (Brooklyn)
- Rabbinical College Ch'san Sofer of New York (Brooklyn)
- Rabbinical Seminary Adas Yereim (Brooklyn)
- Talmudical Seminary Oholei Torah (Brooklyn)
- Torah Teminah Talmudical Seminary (Brooklyn)
- United Talmudical Seminary (Brooklyn)
- Yeshiva and Kollel Harbotzas Torah (Brooklyn)
- Yeshiva Karlin Stolin (Brooklyn)
- Yeshiva of Nitra (Brooklyn)
- Yeshivas Novominsk (Brooklyn)
- Beis Medrash Heichal Dovid (Far Rockaway)
- Rabbinical Seminary of America (Flushing)
- Yeshiva Shaar Hatorah (Kew Gardens)
- Rabbinical College of Long Island (Long Beach)
- Shor Yoshuv Rabbinical College (Lawrence)
- U.T.A. Mesivta-Kiryas Joel (Kiryas Joel)
- Rabbinical College Beth Shraga (Monsey)
- Ohr Somayach Tanenbaum Education Center (Monsey)
- Yeshiva and Kolel Bais Medrash Elyon (Monsey)
- Yeshivath Viznitz (Monsey)
- Yeshiva of the Telshe (Riverdale)
- Talmudical Institute of Upstate New York (Rochester)

=== Ohio ===
- Rabbinical College of Telshe (Wickliffe, Ohio)

=== Pennsylvania ===
- Talmudical Yeshiva of Philadelphia (Philadelphia)
- Yeshivath Beth Moshe (Scranton)

== See also ==
- List of earliest coeducational colleges and universities in the United States
- Men's colleges
- Women's colleges in the United States
