= Franck Marie Quoëx =

Liechtensteiner priest (1966–2007)

The Reverend Franck Marie Quoëx
- Church: Roman Catholic Church
- Archdiocese: Archdiocese of Vaduz, Liechtenstein

Orders
- Ordination: 21 June 1992 by Pietro Palazzini

Personal details
- Born: 21 June 1967 Bonneville, Haute-Savoie, France
- Died: 2 January 2007 (aged 39) Aubonne, Switzerland
- Buried: Lausanne, Switzerland
- Denomination: Roman Catholic
- Education: Pontifical University of St. Thomas Aquinas, Rome
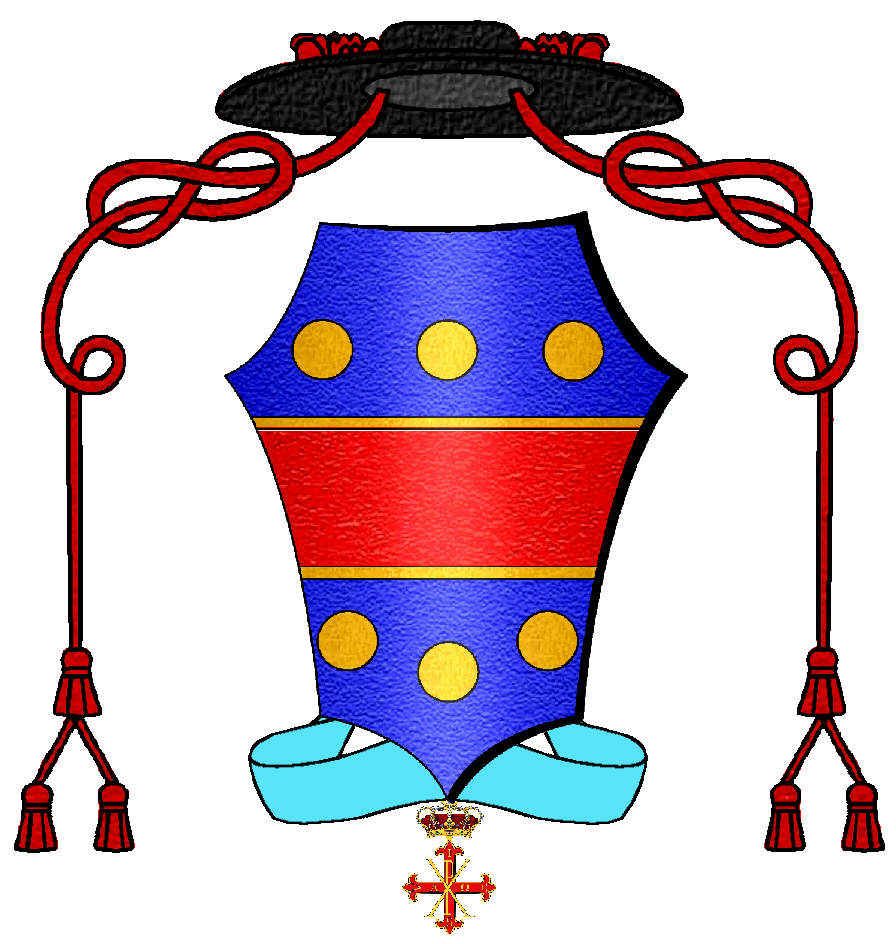
- Coat of arms: Franck Marie Quoëx's coat of arms

Franck Marie Quoëx (21 June 1967 - 2 January 2007) was a Roman Catholic priest for the Archdiocese of Vaduz, Liechtenstein. He was a liturgical scholar and professor of liturgy who worked at the seminary of the Priestly Fraternity of St. Peter.

== Biography ==
=== Early life ===
Franck Marie Quoëx was born on 21 June 1967 at Bonneville, Haute-Savoie in France, into an old Savoyard family. He liked to be defined as Savoyard rather than French, thus showing his dual culture mixing with France and Italy.

=== Priestly ministry ===
In 1986, he entered the International Seminary of St. Pius X in Ecône, Switzerland. But he joined the Institute of Christ the King Sovereign Priest in 1989; at that time the institute was just founded and initially in Moissac, France, and then in Gricigliano, Italy.

On 21 June 1992, his 25th birthday, he was ordained a priest by Cardinal Pietri Palazzini according to the Tridentine Rite. Then he started to studying theology at the Pontifical University of St. Thomas Aquinas (as known as "Angelicum") in Rome. He defended his doctoral thesis on "The External Acts of Worship in the History of Salvation according to St. Thomas Aquinas".

Fr. Quoëx was also a professor of liturgy at the Seminary of the Priestly Fraternity of St. Peter in Wigratzbad, Bavaria. He had also been appointed professor at the Pontifical University of the Holy Cross in Rome few days before his death.

He was the Master of Ceremonies for Cardinal Alfons Maria Stickler for a couple of years.

=== Death ===
In May 2006, Fr. Quoëx was diagnosed with cancer, which took his life less than nine months later. He died on 2 January 2007 in a hospital of Aubonne, Switzerland, and was buried in the cemetery of Lausanne, Switzerland, he was 39 years old and 15 years within the priesthood.

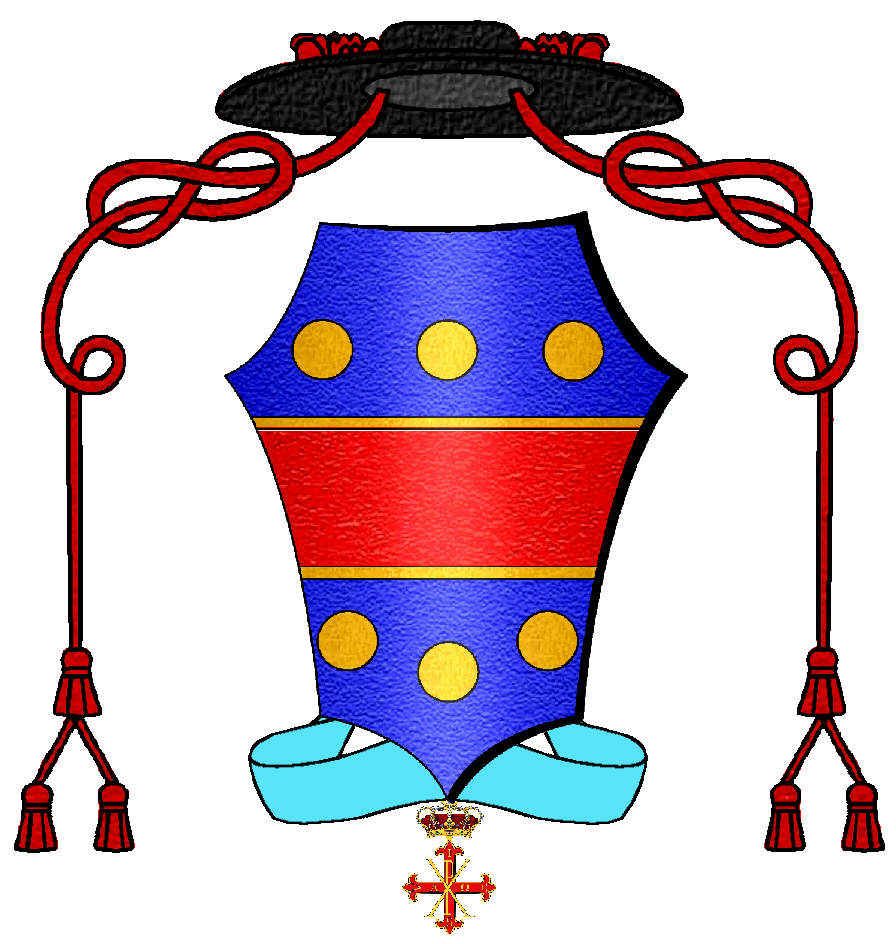
Fr. Quoëx's Coat of Arms

=== Bibliography ===
- "Ritualité et chant sacré dans l'Ordo romanus primus (VII-VIIIème siècle)" (Milan: Vita e pensiero, 2002)
- (editor), Cristina Campo, Entre deux mondes: poèmes liturgiques (Geneva: Ad Solem, 2006) ISBN 9782884820790
- Liturgical Theology in Thomas Aquinas: Sacrifice and Salvation History, Thomistic Ressourcement Series, (Catholic University of America Press, 2023) ISBN 9780813237558
