= Gabet =

Gabet is the surname of:

- Charles Gabet (1821–1903), French playwright and librettist
- George Gabet, American Catholic clergyman, brother of Sharon Gabet
- Joseph Gabet (1808–1853), French Catholic Lazarite missionary
- Olivier Gabet, French director of Musée des Arts Décoratifs, Paris on 2016 book jury at Festival international du livre d'art et du film
- Sharon Gabet (born 1952), American soap opera actress, sister of George Gabet

== Nickname ==
- Gabet Chapuisat (born 1948), Swiss football defender and manager a/k/a Pierre-Albert Chapuisat
