= Andrzej Komorowski =

Polish catholic priest (born 1975)

The Very Reverend Andrzej Komorowski FSSP
- Superior General Emeritus of the Priestly Fraternity of St. Peter
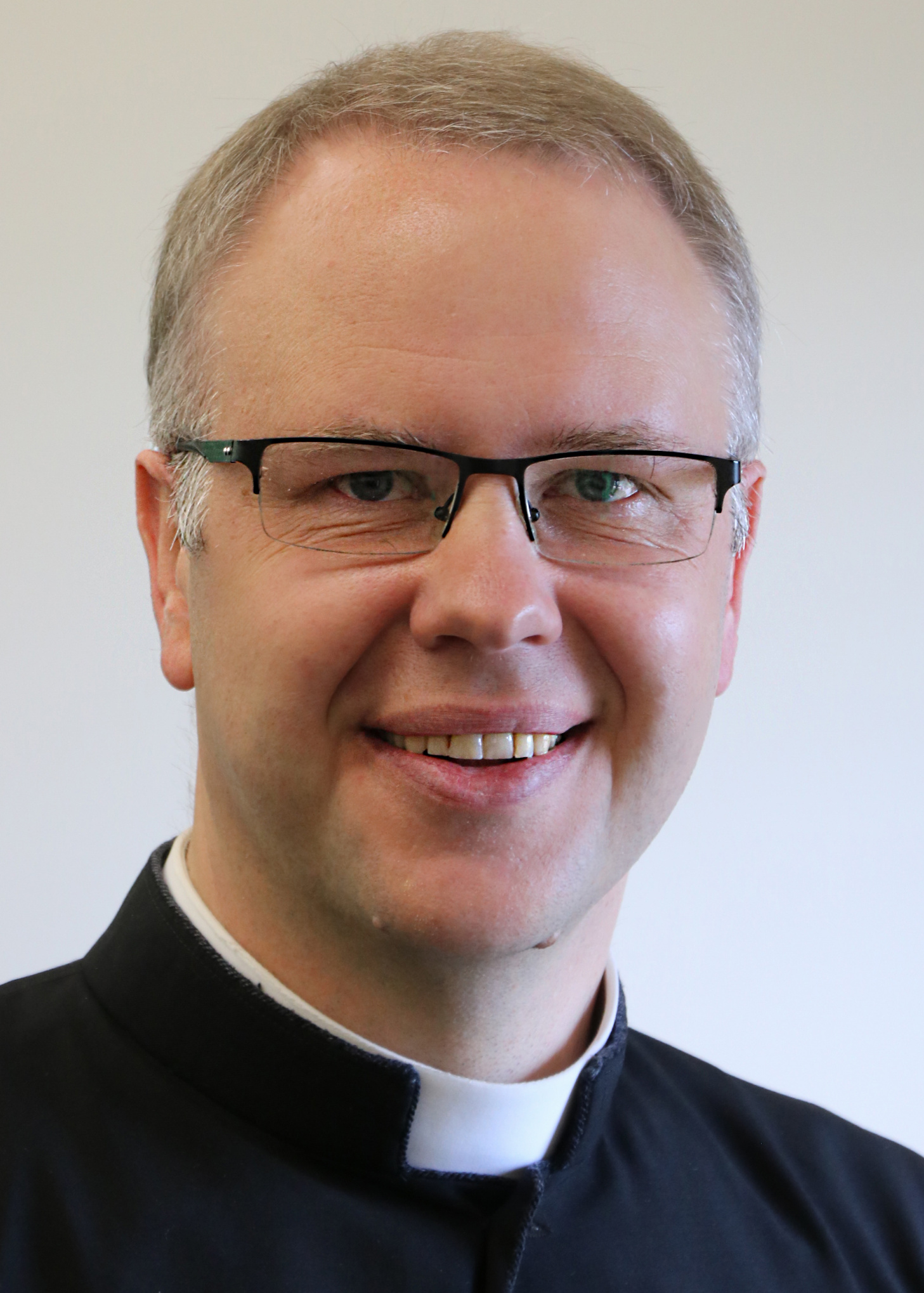
- Elected: July 9, 2018
- Installed: July 9, 2018
- Term ended: July 9, 2024
- Predecessor: Fr. John Berg
- Successor: Fr. John Berg

Orders
- Ordination: September 2006 (Priest) by Jorge Medina Cardinal Estevez

Personal details
- Born: 19 October 1975 (age 50) Łomża, Poland
- Residence: Fribourg, Switzerland

Andrzej Komorowski (born 19 October 1975) is a Polish traditionalist Catholic priest and the former Superior General of the Priestly Fraternity of Saint Peter. He was elected to a six-year term on 9 July 2018 by the General Chapter of the Fraternity at Our Lady of Guadalupe Seminary located in Denton, Nebraska. He was succeeded by Fr. John Berg on July 9, 2024.

Komorowski resides at the Fraternity's General House in Fribourg, Switzerland. He is the fourth Superior General of the Priestly Fraternity of Saint Peter and the first Pole to hold that position.

At their February 29, 2024 private meeting at Vatican City, Pope Francis confirmed that the Tridentine Mass restrictions do not apply to the Priestly Fraternity of Saint Peter.

Catholic Church titles
Preceded by John Berg	Superior General of the Priestly Fraternity of St. Peter; 2018–2025	Succeeded by John Berg
