= Holy Family Catholic Church (Dayton, Ohio) =

Coordinates: 39.7618°N 84.1559°W

- Location: Dayton, Ohio, United States
- Address: 140 S. Findlay St., Dayton, OH
- Language(s): Latin, English
- Denomination: Catholic
- Tradition: Roman Rite (Tridentine Mass)
- Website: daytonlatinmass.org

History
- Status: Parish church
- Founded: 1905
- Dedication: The Holy Family
- Dedicated: 12 May, 1907

Architecture
- Functional status: Active
- Architectural type: Church
- Completed: c. 1925

Administration
- Archdiocese: Cincinnati
- Parish: Holy Family Parish

Clergy
- Priest(s): Fr. George Gabet, F.S.S.P.

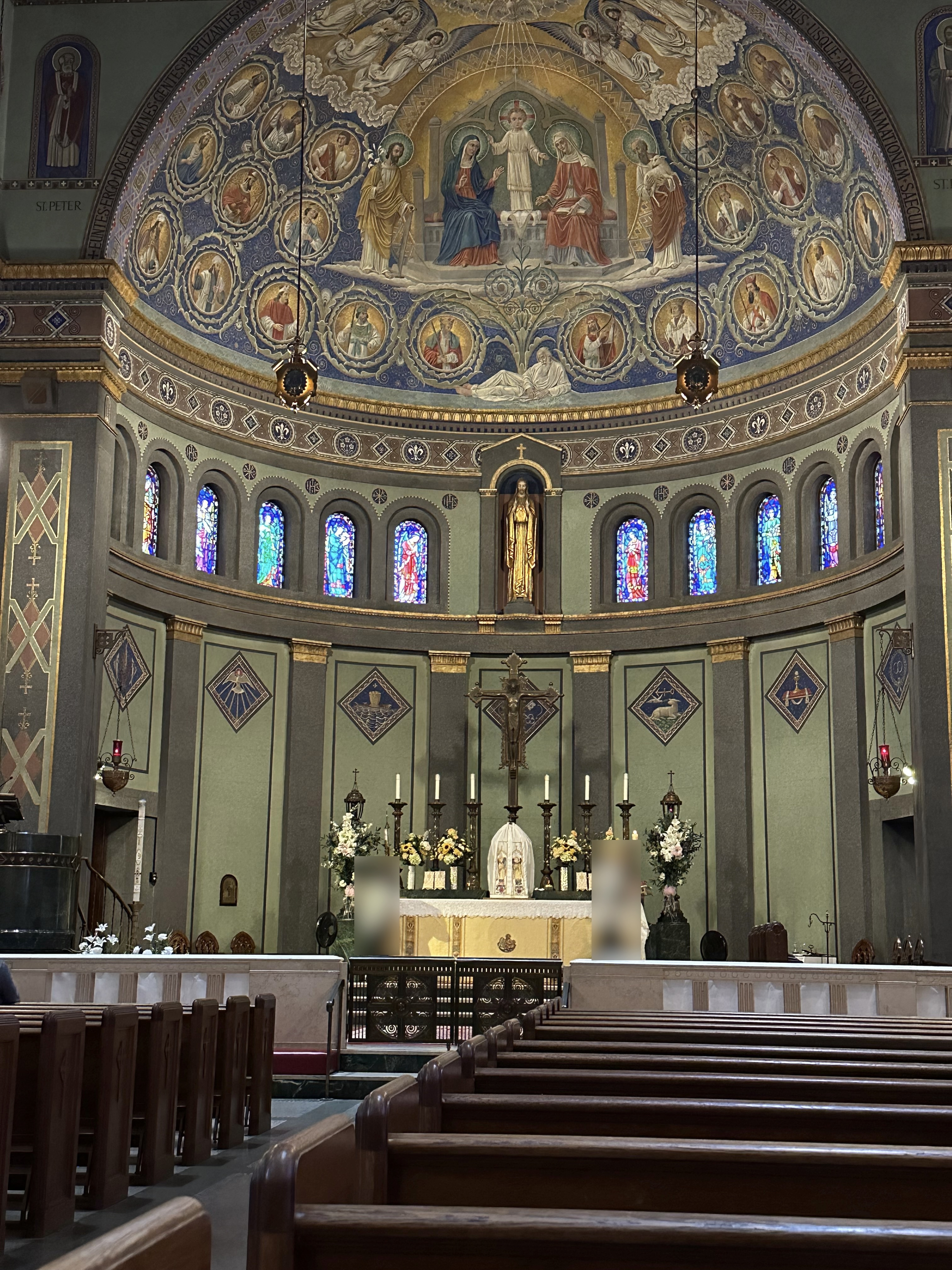
The apse area inside the church

Holy Family Catholic Church is a Catholic parish located at the corner of Findlay and Third streets in East Dayton, Ohio. It is notable as the only diocesan-approved parish in the Archdiocese of Cincinnati to exclusively offer the Tridentine Mass, exclusively dedicated to the 1962 Roman Missal on a daily basis. The parish is operated by the Priestly Fraternity of St. Peter (FSSP), a society of apostolic life dedicated to the traditional Roman Rite liturgy. Its current pastor since 2016 is Father George Gabet.

== History ==
=== Parish founding ===
The parish of Holy Family was founded in 1905 while the church building itself was constructed in 1925 in a late Romanesque revival style. The parish was created out of a need to provide church facilities, and school accommodations for the then children of 194 families of East Dayton where the church is located.

Holy Family would have originally celebrated the Mass in Latin, as the Tridentine Mass was the widespread liturgy of the Roman Catholic Church before the introduction of the Novus Ordo Mass which utilizes local vernacular following the Second Vatican Council.

At some point after these liturgical reforms and prior to its current exclusive dedication to the Traditional Latin Mass, Holy Family operated as a "regular diocesan parish" that celebrated the "English Rite."

=== Latin Mass community formation within Holy Family ===
A Latin Mass community would later emerge and began to gather "under the wings of the parish" at Holy Family. This community started under Archbishop Daniel Pilarczyk. A key figure in its development was Father Mark Wojdelski, whose history with the Dayton Latin Mass group dates back to 2006. He began commuting from Indiana on Sundays to say Mass for the group and would later be appointed chaplain in 2008. Father Wojdelski expressed a preference for celebrating the liturgy with the priest facing the altar (ad orientem), rather than facing the congregation, perceiving it as directing prayers to God rather than a conversation between the priest and people.

At some point, the Latin Mass community temporarily "moved to Holy Rosary for a little while." Later, the Tridentine Mass within the Archdiocese of Cincinnati was shaped by the papal directive given by Pope Benedict XVI, in his Summorum Pontificum (2007), which affirmed that people should be able to have the Latin Mass and eliminated the requirement for explicit permission from the diocesan bishop to offer it.

=== Entrustment to the FSSP ===
On July 1, 2010, Archbishop Dennis Schnurr entrusted Holy Family Catholic Church to the Priestly Fraternity of St. Peter (FSSP), making it the first and only diocesan-approved parish in the Archdiocese of Cincinnati to exclusively offer the Tridentine Mass seven days a week. This decision by Archbishop Schnurr was described as "happy to honor a request for the parish to be dedicated to this form of liturgy."

When Holy Family Catholic Church was established as a Tridentine Mass parish in 2010, Father Mark Wojdelski became its pastor.

== Architecture ==
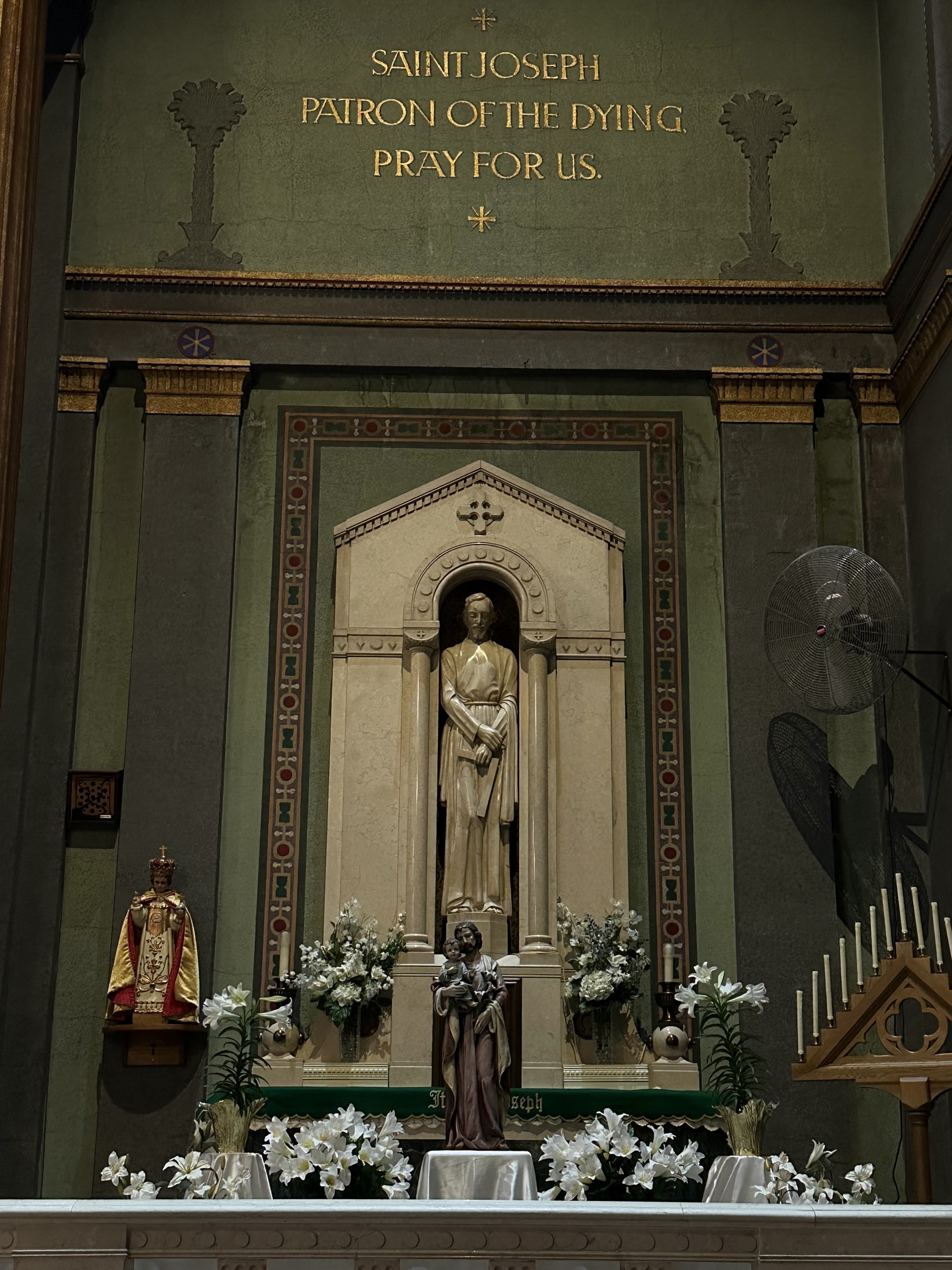
Carved stone side altar of Saint Joseph inside the church

The church is built in a Romanesque revival style.

== Congregation and culture ==
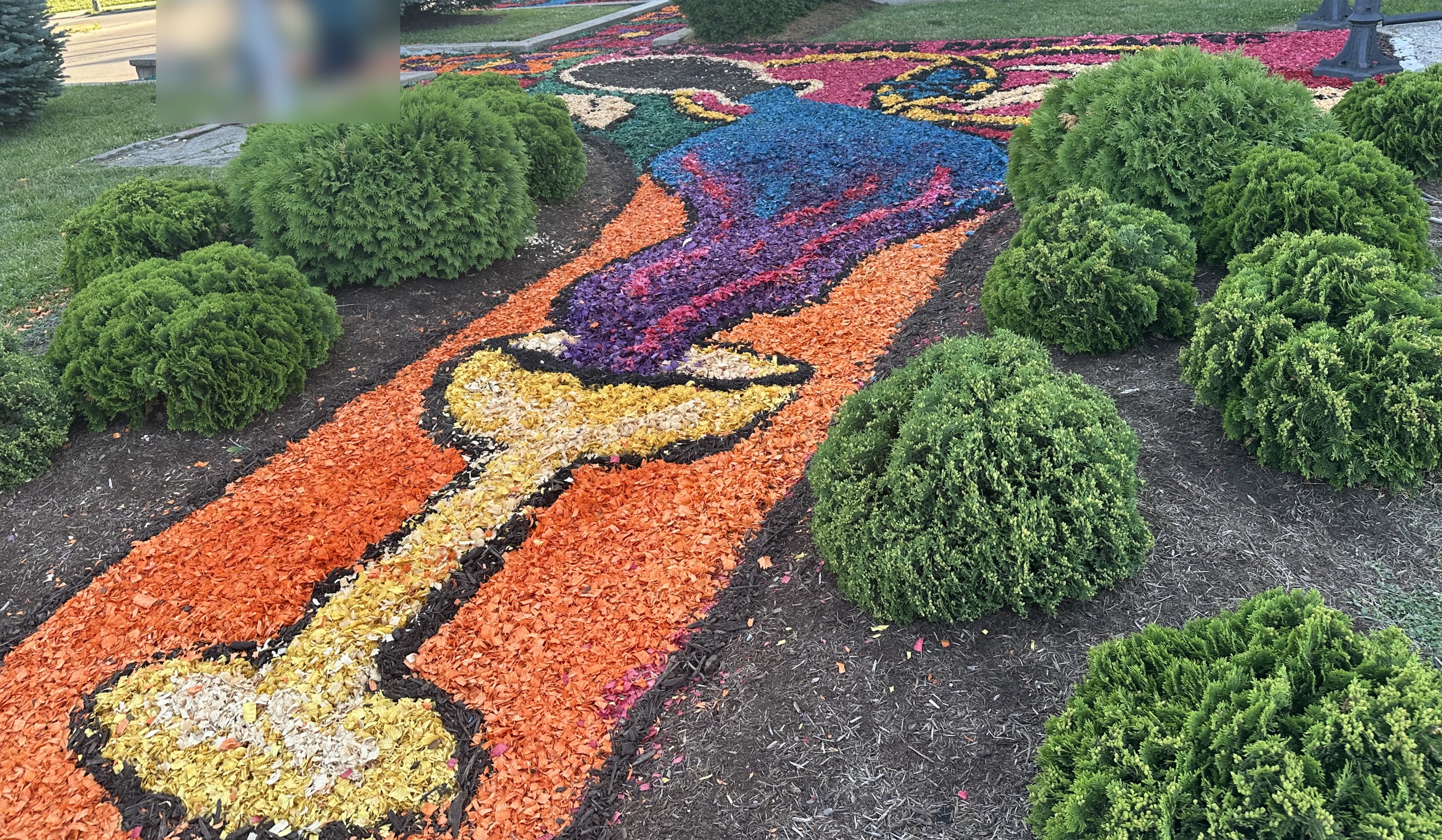
Portion of wood chip design outside of Holy Family Catholic Church

As of 2017, Holy Family Church draws approximately 350 parishioners to Sunday morning Masses, including attendees from neighboring counties such as Mercer, Champaign, and some from Indiana. Parishioners typically observe traditional dress norms, with many men wearing suits and women wearing dresses or skirts, often with lace chapel veils. The parish emphasizes reverent silence during liturgy. The congregation includes a notable number of young families, many of whom homeschool their children.

== See also ==
- FSSP
- George Gabet
- Traditional Catholicism
