= Sumich =

Sumich is a surname. Notable people with the surname include:

- Antony Sumich (born 1964), Croatian rugby and cricket player, rugby coach, and priest
- Peter Sumich (born 1968), Australian rules footballer
- Roger Sumich (born 1955), cyclist from New Zealand
