= United Talmudical Seminary =

Private Rabbinical college

Coordinates: 40°41′56.9″N 73°57′51.8″W

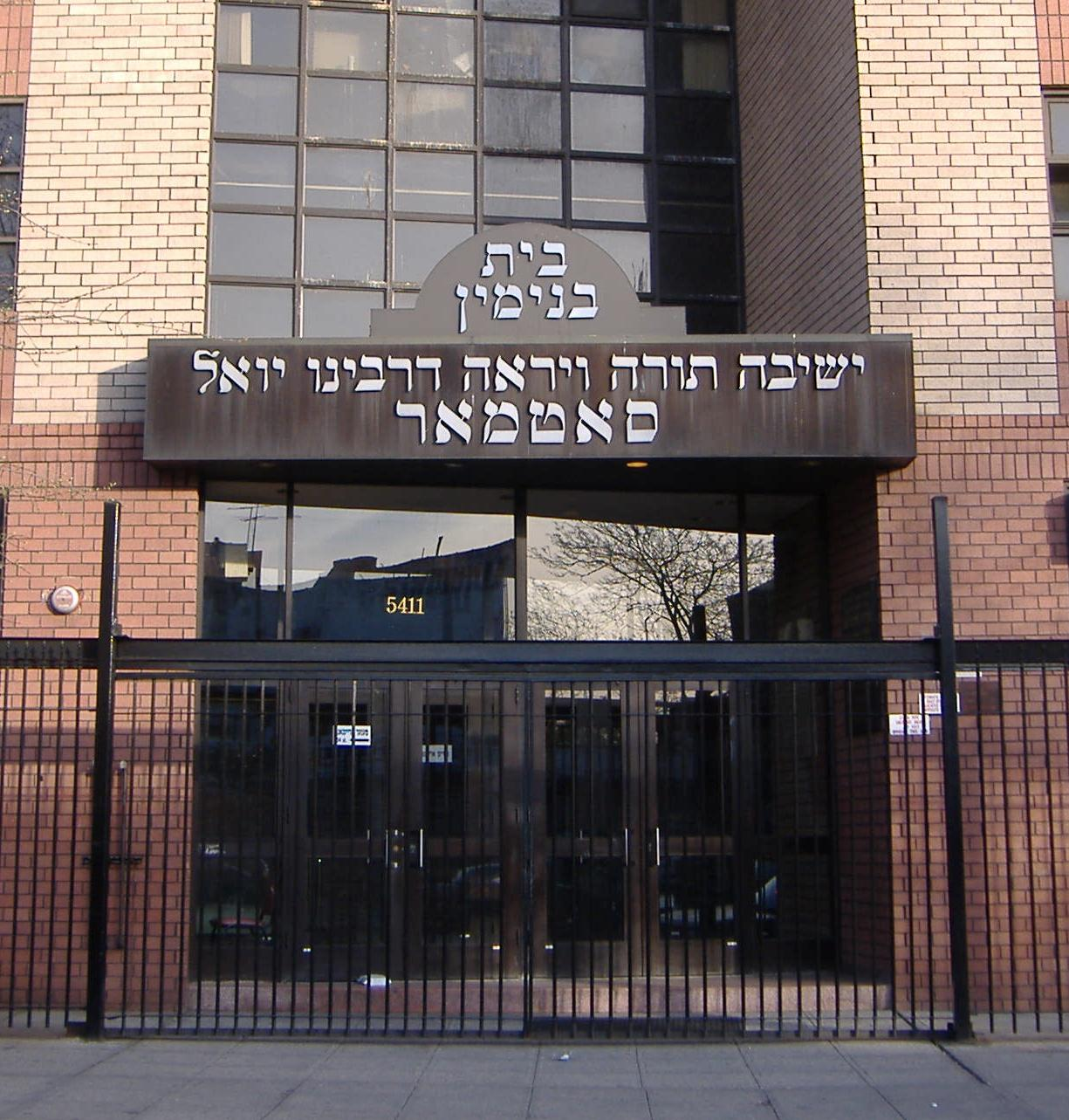
The Yeshiva in Brooklyn

The United Talmudical Seminary or Yeshiva Torah ViYirah DeRabbeinu Yoel MeSatmar is a private Rabbinical college, or yeshiva, for Satmar students, with locations in Brooklyn and Queens, New York. In the 2004–2005 academic year, it had 1,125 students in all degree fields; in 2006–2007, 869 of its students were undergraduates. Due to its nature as a Rabbinical college, all students are male.

The seminary emphasizes the study of the Talmud and Halakha in order to prepare students for their religious vocations. Bachelor's, first professional, and Master's degrees are offered. It is accredited by the Association of Advanced Rabbinical and Talmudic Schools.

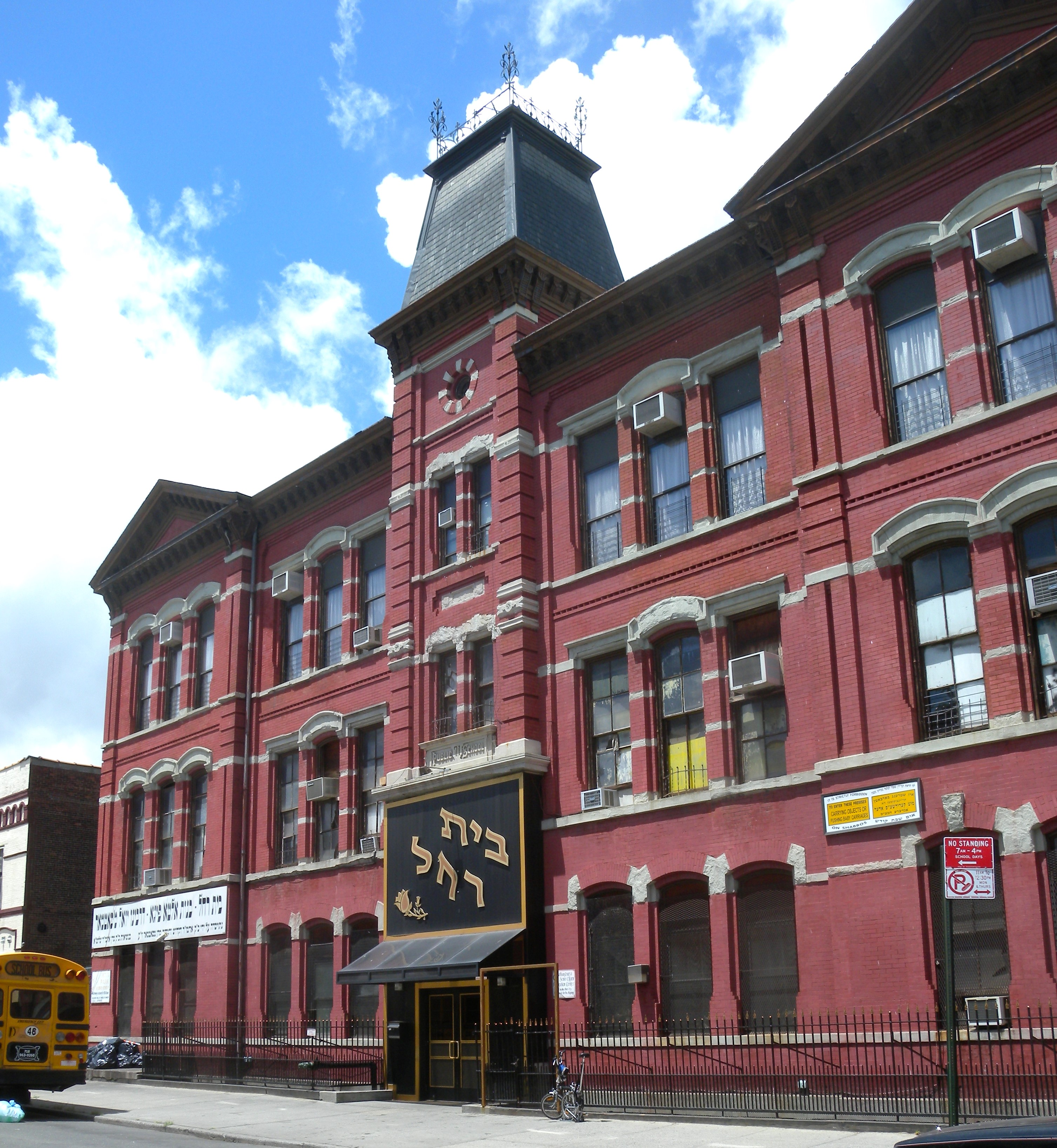
Bais Rochel, the girls division
