= Josef Bisig =

Swiss priest

The Very Reverend Josef Meinrad Bisig F.S.S.P.
- Founder of Priestly Fraternity of Saint Peter
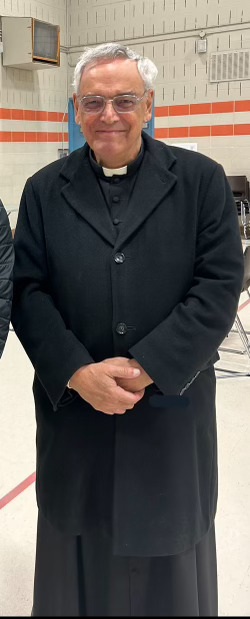
- Josef Bisig during a meeting with members of St. Clement Parish in Ottawa, Canada in 2023
- Successor: Arnaud Devillers
- Other post: Rector of the Our Lady of Guadalupe Seminary
- Previous post: Superior General Emeritus of the Priestly Fraternity of St. Peter

Orders
- Ordination: 29 June 1977 (Priest) by Marcel Lefebvre

Personal details
- Born: September 2, 1952 (age 73) Steinhausen, Switzerland
- Residence: Our Lady of Guadalupe Seminary, Denton, Nebraska, United States of America

Josef Meinrad Bisig (born on 2 September 1952) is a Swiss traditionalist Catholic priest. He was co-founder and first superior general of the Priestly Fraternity of Saint Peter, created in 1988. He was originally a member of the Society of Saint Pius X but left when founder Archbishop Marcel Lefebvre illicitly consecrated four bishops, to create the Priestly Fraternity of Saint Peter.

Formerly a seminary rector in Europe, Bisig was appointed vice-rector and theology professor at Our Lady of Guadalupe Seminary in 2005. Bisig became rector in 2006 and is also a councillor of his order. He has a licentiate in Sacred Theology, and was preparing a doctorate of theology as of 2006. He speaks German, French, English and Italian.
