= John Berg (priest) =

American Catholic priest

The Very Reverend John M. Berg FSSP
- Superior General of the Priestly Fraternity of St. Peter
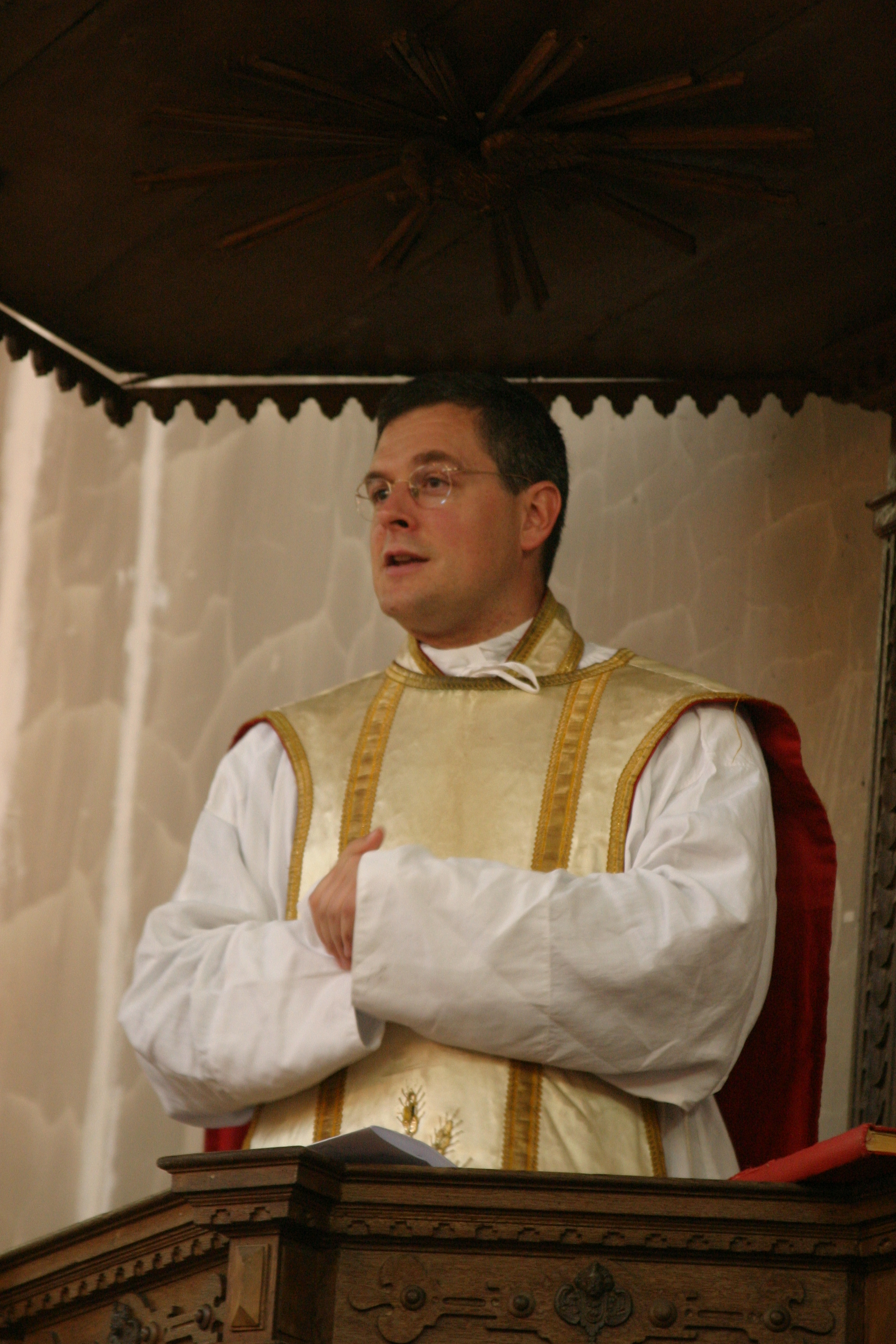
- Elected: July 7, 2006; July 9, 2024
- In office: 2006–2018; 2024–
- Predecessor: Arnaud Devillers (2000–2006); Andrzej Komorowski (2018–2024)

Orders
- Ordination: 6 September 1997 (Priest) by James Timlin

Personal details
- Born: 1970 (age 55–56)
- Residence: Omaha, Nebraska
- Education: Thomas Aquinas College (B.A., 1993) International Seminary of St. Peter (1996) Pontifical University of the Holy Cross (S.T.L., 1999)

John Marcus Berg FSSP (born 1970) is an American Catholic priest and Superior General of the Priestly Fraternity of Saint Peter. He was elected on July 7, 2006 for a six-year term, and then in July 2012 for a second term. Berg's second term concluded on July 9, 2018. On July 9, 2024, Berg was elected as Superior General for a third term.

== Biography ==
Berg was born to a Catholic family in Minnesota in 1970. Berg graduated from the Academy of Holy Angels in Richfield, MN. Berg studied philosophy at Thomas Aquinas College in California from 1989 to 1993, where he discerned a vocation to the priesthood. In 1994, he entered the Fraternity's seminary in Wigratzbad, where he studied for two years; he finished his studies with a Licentiate in Dogmatic Theology from the Pontifical University of the Holy Cross in Rome. Ordained by Bishop James Timlin of Scranton on September 6, 1997, he has worked as both a pastor and as a seminary professor. Until his election to superior general, Berg was chaplain of the Latin Mass Community of Sacramento, California.

After stepping down as superior of the FSSP in 2018, Berg was appointed as pastor of St. Mary's Church on Broadway in Providence, Rhode Island. In August 2021 he was transferred to the Immaculate Conception Church in Omaha, Nebraska.

In 2024 he was elected to the position of Superior General for a third time.

Catholic Church titles
Preceded by Arnaud Devillers	Superior General of the Priestly Fraternity of St. Peter; 2006–2018	Succeeded by Andrzej Komorowski
Preceded by Andrzej Komorowski	Superior General of the Priestly Fraternity of St. Peter; 2024–	Incumbent
