= George Gabet =

American Catholic priest

George Gabet FSSP was formerly the district superior of the Priestly Fraternity of Saint Peter in North America, and is now the pastor for the fraternity's apostolate in Dayton, Ohio.

Gabet was born in Fort Wayne, Indiana, where he attended Bishop Dwenger High School. After high school he studied at Ball State University in Muncie, Indiana. Later he worked for the American Red Cross. Gabet was in graduate school at Indiana University-Purdue University when he decided to test a priestly vocation. In 1991 he entered St. Peter's Seminary, the Fraternity of St Peter's international seminary in Wigratzbad, Germany.

Gabet was ordained a deacon in 1996 by Wolfgang Haas, then Bishop of Chur-Zurich, Switzerland. In 1997 he was ordained priest by Bishop John M D'Arcy of the Diocese of Fort Wayne–South Bend. He served as a curate in the Latin Mass parish in the Diocese of Tulsa, Oklahoma. In 1998 he was transferred to St. Patrick's Parish in the Archdiocese of Omaha for two years. Reassigned to Tulsa, Father Gabet became pastor of the traditional rite-Parish of St. Peter, where he remained for three years.

The North American District of the Fraternity of St Peter, which maintains its headquarters in the Diocese of Scranton, Pennsylvania, has nearly 50 priests serving in 25 dioceses throughout the United States and Canada. The fraternity's North American house of formation, Our Lady of Guadalupe Seminary, is located in the Diocese of Lincoln, Nebraska, and has over 60 seminarians.

In February 2008, Gabet's term as district superior ended. His successor was Eric Flood. Gabet was appointed the pastor of Holy Family Catholic Church in Dayton, Ohio, of the Archdiocese of Cincinnati in July 2016.
