= St. Gregory's Academy =

Location
- Elmhurst, (Lackawanna County), Pennsylvania 18444; United States; 41°22′56″N 75°32′33″W

Information
- Type: Private Boarding school, All-Male
- Motto: Bonum Verum Pulchrum (The Good, the True, the Beautiful)
- Religious affiliation: Roman Catholic
- Patron saints: St. Gregory the Great, St. John Bosco
- Established: 1993
- Status: Closed
- Closed: 2012
- Grades: 9-12
- Campus size: 190 acres (0.77 km^{2})
- Colors: Red and Black
- Song: Minstrel Boy
- Athletics: Soccer and Rugby
- Team name: Highlanders

St. Gregory's Academy was an all-male Roman Catholic boarding school in Elmhurst, Pennsylvania. Affiliated with the Priestly Fraternity of St. Peter, it was founded in 1993. The academy was closed at the end of the 2011–2012 academic year.

In response to the closure of the school, members of the school community, including faculty and alumni, founded a new school, St. Gregory the Great Academy, which graduated its first class in 2014.
