= Bridgetown North, Ohio =

- Former CDP
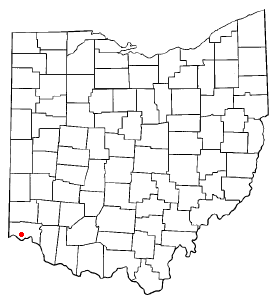
- Location of Bridgetown North, Ohio
- Coordinates: 39°9′26″N 84°37′51″W
- Country: United States
- State: Ohio
- County: Hamilton

Area
  - Total: 3.4 sq mi (8.7 km^{2})
  - Land: 3.4 sq mi (8.7 km^{2})
  - Water: 0 sq mi (0.0 km^{2})

Population (2000)
  - Total: 12,569
  - Density: 3,735/sq mi (1,442.1/km^{2})
- Time zone: UTC-5 (Eastern (EST))
  - Summer (DST): UTC-4 (EDT)
- FIPS code: 39-08605

Bridgetown North was a census-designated place (CDP) in Hamilton County, Ohio, United States. The population was 12,569 at the 2000 census. Its name was changed to Bridgetown for the 2010 census, as its area expanded to the south.

== Geography ==
Bridgetown North was located at 39°9′26″N 84°37′51″W (39.157209, -84.630697).

According to the United States Census Bureau, the CDP had a total area of 3.4 square miles (8.8 km^{2}), all of it land.

== Demographics ==
Historical population
Census	Pop.	Note	%±
1970	13,362		—
1980	11,460		−14.2%
1990	11,748		2.5%
2000	12,569		7.0%

As of the census of 2000, there were 12,569 people, 5,079 households, and 3,509 families residing in the CDP. The population density was 3,735.1 inhabitants per square mile (1,442.1/km^{2}). There were 5,240 housing units at an average density of 1,557.1 per square mile (601.2/km^{2}). The racial makeup of the CDP was 98.40% White, 0.36% African American, 0.06% Native American, 0.53% Asian, 0.02% Pacific Islander, 0.12% from other races, and 0.52% from two or more races. Hispanic or Latino of any race were 0.50% of the population.

There were 5,079 households, out of which 31.0% had children under the age of 18 living with them, 55.8% were married couples living together, 10.4% had a female householder with no husband present, and 30.9% were non-families. 28.5% of all households were made up of individuals, and 16.7% had someone living alone who was 65 years of age or older. The average household size was 2.47 and the average family size was 3.06.

In the CDP, the population was spread out, with 25.5% under the age of 18, 6.7% from 18 to 24, 27.6% from 25 to 44, 19.6% from 45 to 64, and 20.6% who were 65 years of age or older. The median age was 39 years. For every 100 females, there were 89.0 males. For every 100 females age 18 and over, there were 83.7 males.

The median income for a household in the CDP was $45,771, and the median income for a family was $55,084. Males had a median income of $40,331 versus $28,490 for females. The per capita income for the CDP was $22,137. About 2.2% of families and 3.3% of the population were below the poverty line, including 4.7% of those under age 18 and 3.8% of those age 65 or over.
