= Arnaud Devillers =

French Catholic priest

The Very Reverend Arnaud Devillers
- Superior General Emeritus of the Priestly Fraternity of St. Peter
- Predecessor: Josef Bisig
- Successor: John Berg

Orders
- Ordination: 29 June 1985 (Priest)

Personal details
- Born: 2 February 1959 (age 67) La Celle-Saint-Cloud, France

Arnaud Devillers F.S.S.P. (born 2 February 1959) is a French Roman Catholic priest. He was the superior general of the Priestly Fraternity of Saint Peter between 2000 and 2006. He was the second superior general after Josef Bisig and was succeeded by John Berg.

He was ordained to the priesthood on 29 June 1985 and served as a teacher at St. Mary's Academy in Kansas (1985–1988), president of St. Mary's College (1988–1989), and professor of theology at St. Peter's Seminary in Germany (1989–1991).

From 1991 to 2000, he served as district superior of the FSSP's United States District. He subsequently served as superior general of the Priestly Fraternity of St. Peter from 2000 to 2006. After continuing his education at the Pontifical Gregorian University in Rome (2006–2008), he returned to the United States where he served as chaplain of the Latin Mass Community of St. Rose of Lima in Quincy, Illinois, and later as its pastor (2013–2016).

Catholic Church titles
Preceded by Josef Bisig	Superior General of the Fraternity of St Peter; 2000–2006	Succeeded by John Berg
