= St. Ignatius (White Oak) =

Coordinates: 39°10′55″N 84°36′19″W

St. Ignatius is one of the largest Catholic parishes in Ohio. The school has over 1,000 students.
