= St. Augustine Church (Cincinnati) =

Church building in Cincinnati, OH

St. Augustine Church was a Roman Catholic church located at 923 Bank Street near Ailanthus Street in the old West End of Cincinnati, Ohio. The Parish patron was St. Augustine of Hippo.

The parent parish was the English-speaking congregation, Saint Peter in Chains Cathedral. St. Augustine's was organized in 1852 for an English congregation. The cornerstone of the church was laid August 25, 1852, and the dedication took place October 16, 1853. Opposite the church was a large school and parsonage. A residence for the teaching brothers of Mary was situated on nearby Dayton Street.

On June 14, 1857, however, a German congregation bought the church to serve its growing numbers. The church was enlarged by the Germans and rededicated November 13, 1859. In the late 19th century it was one of the largest of the German Catholic parishes in the United States, numbering 900 families in 1896.

The Parish was closed in 1978. Records for this Parish are located at St. Joseph Church, West End.
