= Opfenbach =

- Municipality
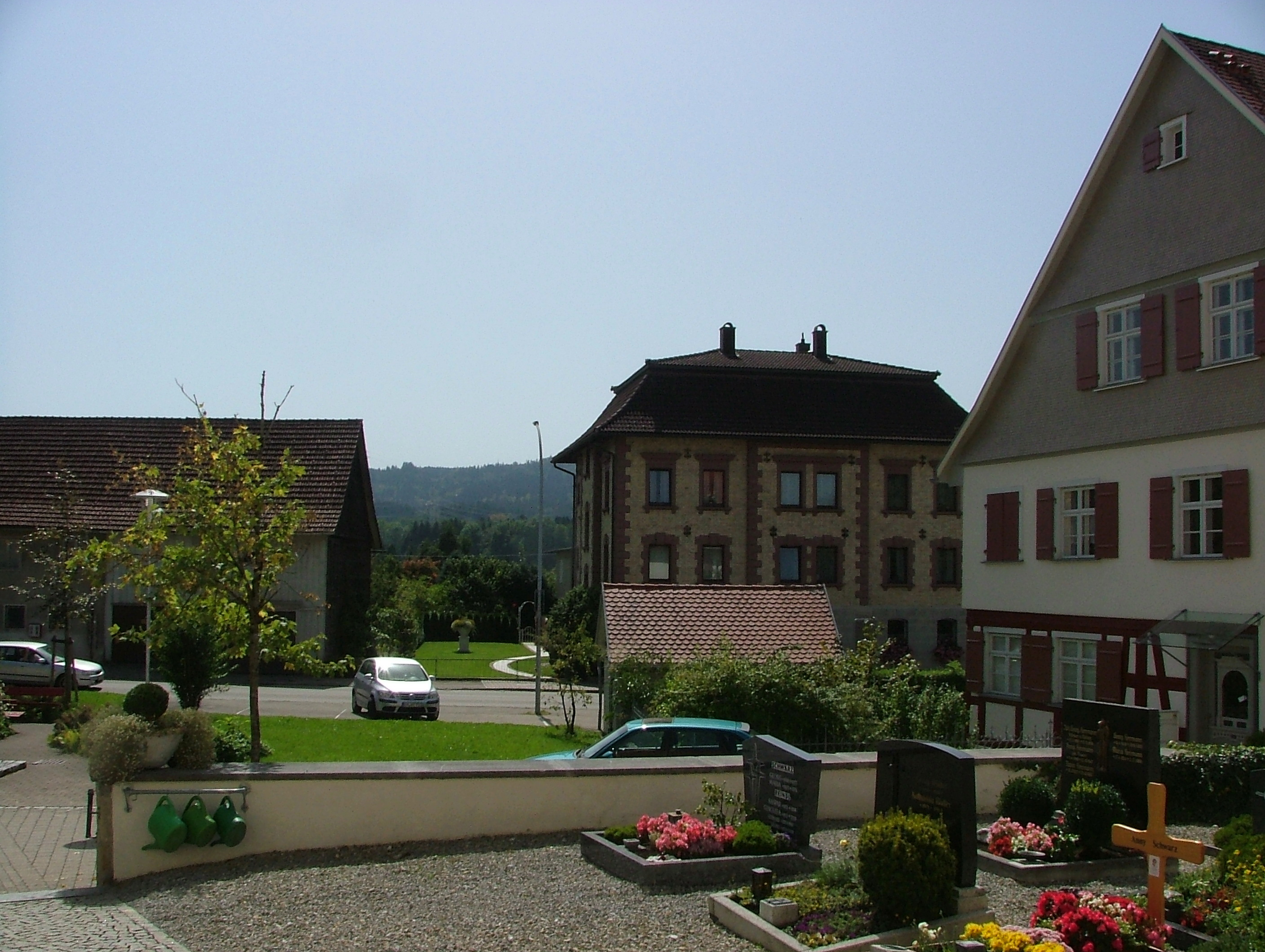

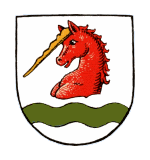
- Coat of arms

- Location of Opfenbach within Lindau district
- Interactive map of Opfenbach
- Location within Germany Location within Bavaria
- Coordinates: 47°37′N 9°49′E
- Country: Germany
- State: Bavaria
- Admin. region: Schwaben
- District: Lindau

Government
  - Mayor (2020–26): Matthias Bentz

Area
  - Total: 16.79 km^{2} (6.48 sq mi)
- Elevation: 500–800 m (1,600–2,600 ft)

Population (2025-12-31)
  - Total: 2,345
  - Density: 139.7/km^{2} (361.7/sq mi)
- Time zone: UTC+01:00 (CET)
  - Summer (DST): UTC+02:00 (CEST)
- Postal codes: 88145
- Dialling codes: 08385
- Vehicle registration: LI
- Website: www.opfenbach.de

Opfenbach is a municipality in the district of Lindau in Bavaria in Germany.

== Geography ==
Opfenbach is located in the Allgäu region, more precisely in the Westallgäu, about 15 km from Lindau. One of the districts of Opfenbach is Wigratzbad. Others are Mellatz, Beuren, Heimen, Litzis, Göritz, Mywiler and Ruhlands.

== History ==
Opfenbach once was part of the Austrian authority of Bregenz-Hohenegg. Since the signing of the peace treaties of Brünn and Preßburg in 1805 the town belongs to Bavaria. In the course of the administrative reforms in Bavaria, the contemporary municipality was formed by the "Gemeindeedikt" of 1818.

=== Population development ===
In 1970 1,879, in 1987 1,952 and in 2000 2,196 inhabitants were living in the municipality of Opfenbach.

== Politics ==
Matthias Bentz (Opfenbach direkt) is mayor of the town.

The revenue from the municipal tax added up to 869,000 € in 1999, of which the net business tax amounted to 160,000 €.

== Economy and infrastructure ==
=== Economy, agriculture and forestry ===
According to the official statistics, in 1998 there were neither employees who were subject to social insurance contribution in the industrial sector, nor in the sector of trade and transport at place of work. In miscellaneous sector there were 110 people employed at place of work. At place of domicile there were 711 employees altogether. In the industrial sector there were none, in the main construction trade two businesses. Moreover, there were 62 agricultural businesses in 1999 with a total area of 1,010 ha.

=== Education ===
In 1999 there were the following institutions:

- Kindergartens: 75 kindergarten places and 72 children
- An elementary school with six teachers and 102 students
- A seminary in Wigratzbad

=== Place of prayer ===
A catholic place of prayer is located in the district of Wigratzbad. On the occasion of an alleged personal epiphany for Frau Antonie Rädler in a small chapel ("Gnadenkapelle"), the place of prayer developed bit by bit until the so-called "Sühnekirche", a bigger church in modern red steel architecture, was built. In Wigratzbad Blessed Virgin Mary is venerated as "Unsere Liebe Frau vom Sieg" ("Our beloved woman of victory"). The remains of Antonie Rädler and long-time pilgrim pastor Pater Johannes Schmid OP, who is considered saintly by his followers, rest in a particular chapel-like grave.
