= Priestly Fraternity of Saint Peter =

Roman Catholic society of apostolic life

- Fraternitas Sacerdotalis Sancti Petri
- Abbreviation: FSSP
- Formation: July 18, 1988; 38 years ago
- Type: Society of apostolic life of pontifical right (for men)
- Headquarters: Maison Saint Pierre Canisius, Fribourg, Switzerland
- Coordinates: 46.804796°N 7.160385°E
- Members: 602 • 410 priests • 192 seminarians (2026)
- Superior General: Fr. John Berg
- Website: www.fssp.org/en/

The Priestly Fraternity of Saint Peter (Latin: Fraternitas Sacerdotalis Sancti Petri; FSSP; informally the Fraternity) is a traditionalist Catholic society of apostolic life for priests and seminarians. It is in communion with the Holy See. It was founded in 1988 by 12 former members of the Society of Saint Pius X (SSPX) who left following the 1988 Écône consecrations, which resulted in the SSPX bishops being excommunicated by the Holy See.

Headquartered in Switzerland, the society maintains two international seminaries: the International Seminary of St. Peter in Wigratzbad, Opfenbach, Bavaria, Germany, and Our Lady of Guadalupe Seminary in Denton, Nebraska, United States. The society is officially recognized by the Holy See and has 368 priests who celebrate the Tridentine Mass in locations in 147 worldwide dioceses.

== Canonical status ==
According to canon law, the Petrine Fathers are part of a clerical society of apostolic life of pontifical right. It is not, therefore, an institute of consecrated life and members take no religious vows, but are instead bound by the same general laws of celibacy and obedience as diocesan clergy and, in addition, swear an oath as members of the society. The fraternity's pontifical right status means that it has been established by the Pope and is answerable only to him in terms of its operation (through the Dicastery for Institutes of Consecrated Life and Societies of Apostolic Life; prior to January 17, 2019, through the Pontifical Commission Ecclesia Dei), rather than to local bishops. A local bishop still governs the fraternity's work within his respective diocese. In this sense its organization and administrative reporting status are similar to those of religious orders of pontifical right (for example, the Jesuits or Dominicans).

On 28 September 2024, the Dicastery for Institutes of Consecrated Life and Societies of Apostolic Life informed the FSSP that it had opened an apostolic visitation. According to the Fraternity, this is intended to "enable the Dicastery to know who we are, how we are doing and how we live, so as to provide us with any help we may need."

== Mission and charism ==
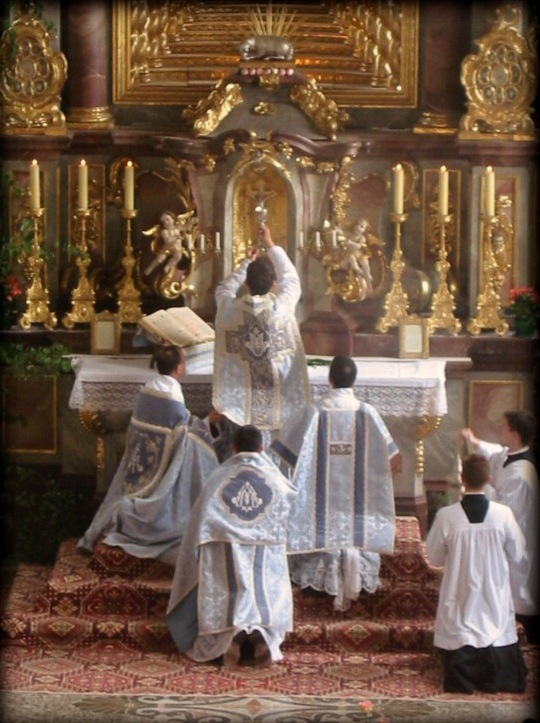
Members of the fraternity celebrating Solemn Mass

The FSSP consists of priests and seminarians who intend to pursue the goal of Christian perfection according to a specific charism, which is to offer the Mass and other sacraments according to the Roman Rite as it existed before the liturgical reforms that followed the Second Vatican Council. Thus, the fraternity uses the Roman Missal, the Roman Breviary, the Pontifical (Pontificale Romanum), and the Roman Ritual in use in 1962, the last editions before the revisions that followed the Council.

The 2007 motu proprio Summorum Pontificum had authorized use of the 1962 Roman Missal by all Latin Church priests as an extraordinary form of the Roman Rite without limit when celebrating Mass "without a congregation". Its use for Mass with a congregation was allowed with the permission of the priest in charge of a church for stable groups attached to this earlier form of the Roman Rite, provided that the priest using it was "qualified to do so and not juridically impeded" (as for instance by suspension). That was abrogated by the 2021 motu proprio Traditionis custodes that emphasized deference towards the Mass of Paul VI and added restrictions to which clergy could celebrate the Roman Rite according to the pre-Vatican II form.

On 4 February 2022, two Petrine Fathers were received by Pope Francis in private audience, who subsequently issued a decree confirming that the FSSP could continue to celebrate the traditional liturgy publicly in their own churches or oratories, or anywhere else with the consent of the local ordinary. The decree was dated 11 February 2022, the Feast of Our Lady of Lourdes, the same day that the FSSP consecrated themselves to the Immaculate Heart of Mary after a nine-day novena. On 29 February 2024, the Superior General of the FSSP, Fr. Andrzej Komorowski, was received in private audience by Pope Francis, who assured them that the FSSP would continue to enjoy the right to celebrate the traditional liturgy.

Following from its charism, the fraternity's mission is twofold: to sanctify each priest through the exercise of his priestly function, and to deploy these priests to parishes. As such, they are to celebrate the sacraments, catechize, preach retreats, organize pilgrimages, and generally provide a full sacramental and cultural life for lay Catholics who are likewise drawn to the rituals of the 1962 missal. In order to help complete its mission, the fraternity has built its own seminaries with the goal of forming men to serve the fraternity.

== Founding ==
For the honour and glory of the holy Catholic Church, for the consolation of the much troubled faithful, and for the peace of their conscience, the undersigned, members until now of the Fraternity of Saint Pius X, declare with profound regret over the illicit consecration of bishops on 30 June [1988] that they have remained within the Catholic Church as pars sanior of this same Fraternity, and that they have but one desire: to be able to live as a religious society in this Church and place themselves at her service under the authority, of course, of the Roman Pontiff, her supreme head.

— From the Declaration of Intention by the Founders (2 July 1988)

The FSSP was established on July 18, 1988, at the Abbey of Hauterive, Switzerland, by twelve priests and twenty seminarians, led by Josef Bisig, all of whom had formerly belonged to Archbishop Marcel Lefebvre's Society of Saint Pius X; they were unwilling to follow that movement into what the Congregation for Bishops and Pope John Paul II declared to be a schismatic act and grounds for excommunication latae sententiae due to the consecration of four bishops without a papal mandate. Fr. Josef Bisig became the fraternity's first superior general.

== Organization ==
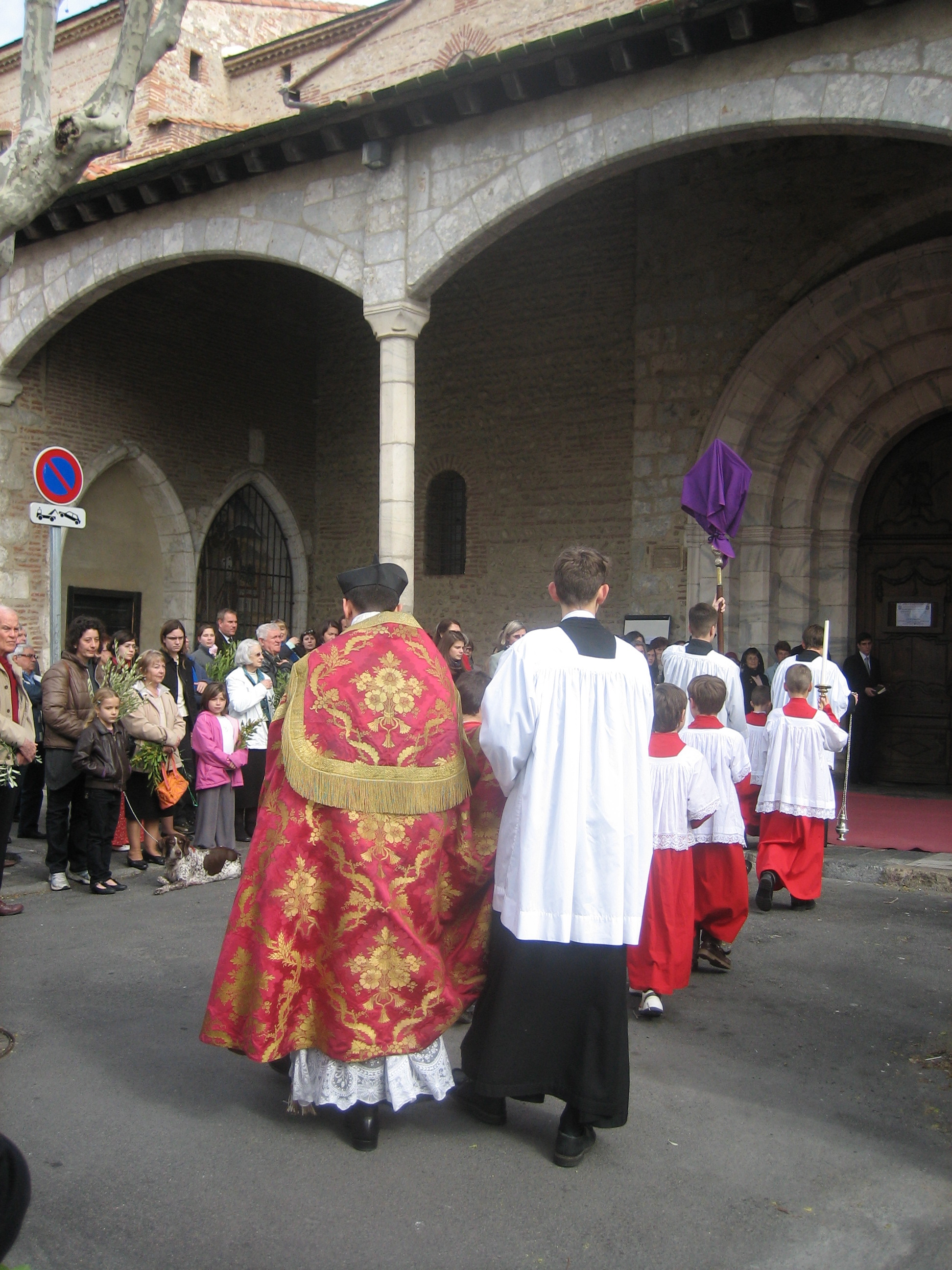
Palm Sunday procession at an FSSP apostolate in Perpignan, France

As of November 2023, the fraternity included 569 members: 368 priests, 22 deacons, and 179 non-deacon seminarians in 146 dioceses spread among Australia, Austria, Benin, Canada, Colombia, Czech Republic, France, Germany, Great Britain, Ireland, Italy, Mexico, Nigeria, New Zealand, Poland, Portugal, Switzerland, the United States, and Vietnam. The fraternity's membership represents 35 nationalities, and the average age of its members is 39. As of 2023, the lay Confraternity of Saint Peter had 9,546 members enrolled, who spiritually support the fraternity's charism.

=== Superiors general ===
The FSSP's current superior general is Fr. John Berg, who was elected to a third (non-consecutive) term as superior general on July 9, 2024. Former superiors general include:

- Fr. Josef Bisig (1988–2000)
- Fr. Arnaud Devillers (2000–2006)
- Fr. John Berg (2006–2018; first term)
- Fr. Andrzej Komorowski (2018–2024)
- Fr. John Berg (2024–present; second term)

=== Provinces, districts and regions ===
The fraternity is divided into four districts:

- German-speaking District, Superior: Fr. Stefan Dreher
- French District, Superior: Fr. Benoît Paul-Joseph
- North American Province, Provincial: Fr. William Lawrence
- Oceania District, Superior: Fr. Michael McCaffrey

=== Educational institutions ===
The fraternity has two seminaries:

- The International Seminary of St. Peter in Wigratzbad-Opfenbach, in the German state of Bavaria (Diocese of Augsburg), was established in 1988. It serves French and German-speaking seminarians. Its current rector is Fr. Vincent Ribeton.
- Our Lady of Guadalupe Seminary, in Denton, Nebraska, United States (Diocese of Lincoln), was established in 1994 and serves English-speaking seminarians. Its current rector is Fr. Josef Bisig.

Ezechiel House, a house of formation for first-year seminarians, exists in the city of Sydney, Australia. The Director of Ezechiel House is Fr. Duncan Wong.

In 2015, the fraternity established Casa Cristo Rey, an apostolate in Guadalajara, Mexico, which it plans to develop into a house of formation for first-year seminarians for native Spanish-speaking postulants. Presently, Casa Cristo Rey serves as a priestly discernment program for young men from Spain and Latin America. In 2016 Casa Cristo Rey opened the Junipero Serra Spanish Institute, a program offering six or eight weeks of Spanish immersion for priests and seminarians.

== See also ==
- Fr. George Gabet
- Fr. Antony Sumich
