= Wigratzbad =

- Hamlet
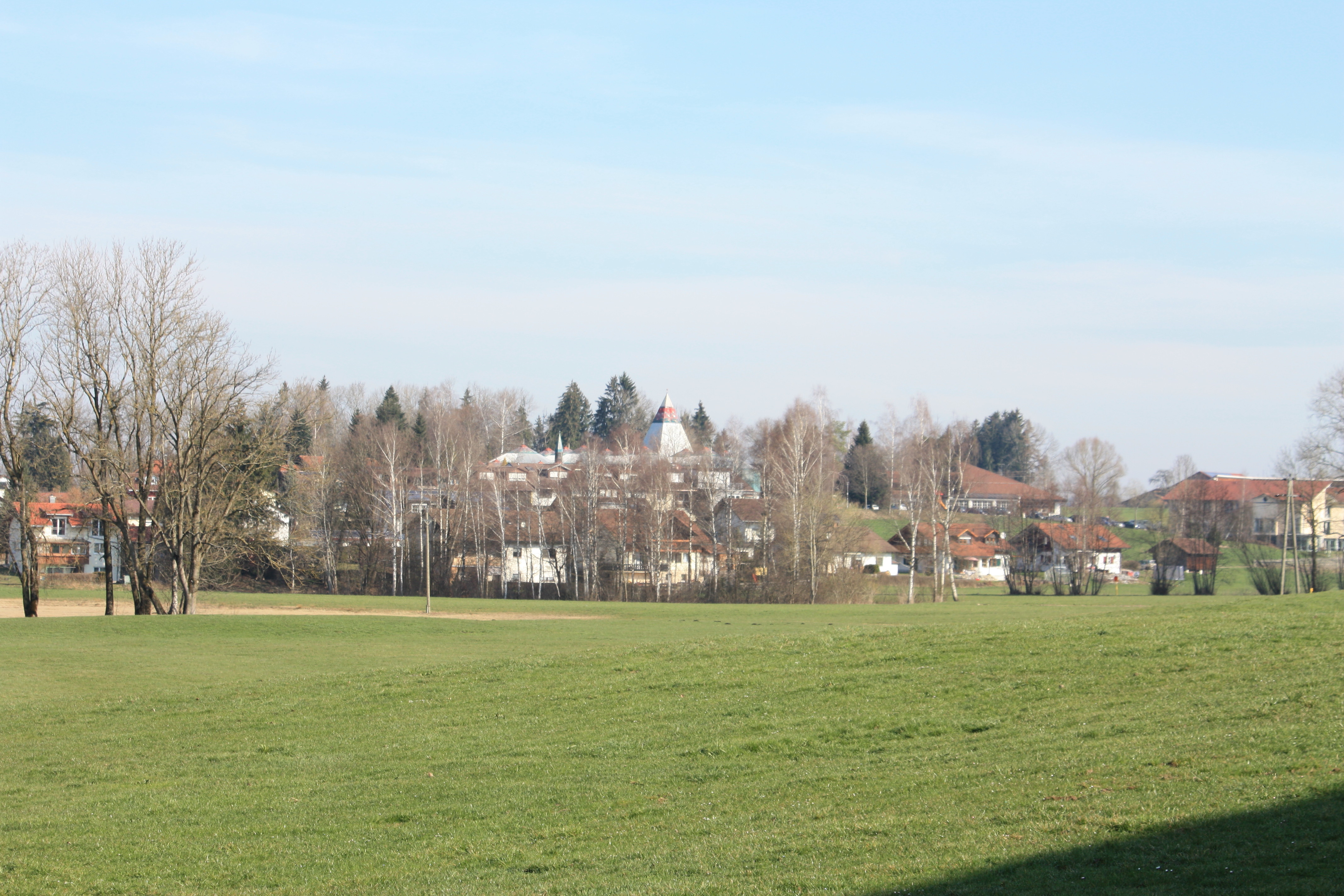

- Location of Wigratzbad in Bavaria
- Coordinates: 47.642109°N 9.83301°E
- Country: Germany
- State: Bavaria
- Admin. region: Swabia
- District: Lindau
- Town: Opfenbach
- Time zone: CET/CEST (UTC+1/+2)
- Postal code: 88145

Wigratzbad is a hamlet in the Lindau district of Bavaria, Germany. The village is 2 kilometres (1 mi) north of the town of Opfenbach, and 0.6 km (0.4 mi) south of Hergatz. It is situated on the ancient frontier of Bavaria and Swabia, a short distance from Germany's borders with Austria and Switzerland.

== Marian apparitions ==
The village of Wigratzbad was home to a series of notable Marian apparitions in the early 20th century. The primary visionary was Antonie Rädler, who, while sick during the 1918 flu pandemic, reported a healing apparition of the Blessed Virgin Mary. Later, following the rise of National Socialism, Rädler defied authorities by refusing to replace an image of the Virgin in her father's butcher shop with one of Adolf Hitler; furthermore, she refused to substitute the Bavarian greeting of Grüß Gott with the mandated Heil Hitler. As a result of her noncompliance, she endured several attempts on her life.

In gratitude for their daughter's survival, Rädler's parents erected a Lourdes grotto in their garden in October 1936; a month later, Rädler reported that the statue "smiled" at her. On December 15, 1936, Rädler had another apparition of angelic choirs singing: "O Mary Immaculate, conceived without sin, beloved Lady of Victory, pray for us". The apparitions were not restricted to Rädler; on February 22, 1936, Cecilia Geyer likewise received an apparition, who told her: "Build a chapel for me here ... I shall crush the head of the infernal serpent with my feet ... People will come to this place in large numbers, and I will pour a flowing of graces over them. Saint Joseph, Saint Anthony and the souls in Purgatory will assist Antonie".

This apparition became known as "Our Beloved Lady, Mother of Victory" and a chapel was constructed in Wigratzbad, dedicated to her patronage. The inauguration of the chapel was planned for December 8, 1938, but Antonie Rädler had been arrested by the Gestapo on November 21. Rädler was freed from prison on December 18, the feast of the Expectation of the Blessed Virgin Mary. The chapel was consecrated on March 25, 1940.

Today, approximately 500,000 pilgrims visit the shrine each year, and spiritual conferences are held weekly at a pilgrimage center. Antonie Rädler died in 1991.

== International Seminary of St. Peter ==
Since 1988, Wigratzbad has also hosted the International Seminary of St. Peter, the first seminary of the Priestly Fraternity of Saint Peter (F.S.S.P.).

The Fraternity was founded in response to the Society of St. Pius X's illicit 1988 Ecône consecrations; several priests and seminarians of that Society wished to remain a traditional Catholic society and offer the Mass and other sacraments according to the Roman Rite as it existed before the liturgical reforms that followed the Second Vatican Council, but nonetheless remain in full communion with the Catholic Church.

Bishop Josef Stimpfle of Augsburg announced that he would accept a canonical establishment for the F.S.S.P. in Wigratzbad as early as August 1988, and on November of that year, 31 seminarians began their studies there. The seminary was previously housed in the Wigratzbad's pilgrimage center, but a shortage of space necessitated a new building. The new structure was opened in the Fall of 2000, with a formal blessing by Darío Cardinal Castrillón Hoyos, president of the Pontifical Commission Ecclesia Dei in December 2000.

As of August 2021, the rector of the seminary is Father Vincent Ribeton. The seminary is located at Kirchstraße, 16 in Wigratzbad.
