= Our Lady of Guadalupe Seminary =

Catholic seminary in Nebraska, United States

Location
- 7880 West Denton Road; Denton, Nebraska 68339; United States; 40.744451°N 96.826123°W

Information
- Type: Catholic seminary
- Established: 2000
- Rector: Josef Bisig
- Affiliations: Catholic Church; Priestly Fraternity of Saint Peter
- Website: www.fsspolgs.org

Our Lady of Guadalupe Seminary of the Priestly Fraternity of Saint Peter, a Society of Apostolic Life in the Catholic Church, is located in Denton, Nebraska. The seminary is well known for cultivating Gregorian chant.

The rector is Josef Bisig.

== History ==
The seminary was canonically established in 1988 by Pope John Paul II in accordance with his letter Ecclesia Dei adflicta and opened in 2000. Established in Denton, Nebraska, near Lincoln, it was founded primarily to serve English-speaking seminarians for the Fraternity from North America and to provide traditionalist Catholic education.

Nonetheless, the custumal of the seminary includes a provision for students who are not members of the Fraternity but are studying for the priesthood in other ecclesiastical organizations, and since 2008 the seminary has served as the location of philosophical and theological education for clerical members of the Sons of the Most Holy Redeemer. The seminary has also housed members of the Knights of the Holy Eucharist, brothers of the Franciscan tradition who originate from the Shrine of the Most Blessed Sacrament.

The seminary complex was designed by Thomas Gordon Smith Architects in a neo-Romanesque style. The first phase of construction was completed in 2000. Seminarians live in the dormitory wing.

== Programs ==
The seminarians receive training in the ancient Tridentine liturgy as it existed in 1962, prior to and during the Second Vatican Council; Gregorian chant is also an integral part of the education. The seminary offers at least one formal vocational retreat annually for those interested in considering priesthood. Admission is limited to males, in accordance with the Catholic understanding of the priesthood.
