= Denton, Nebraska =

- Village
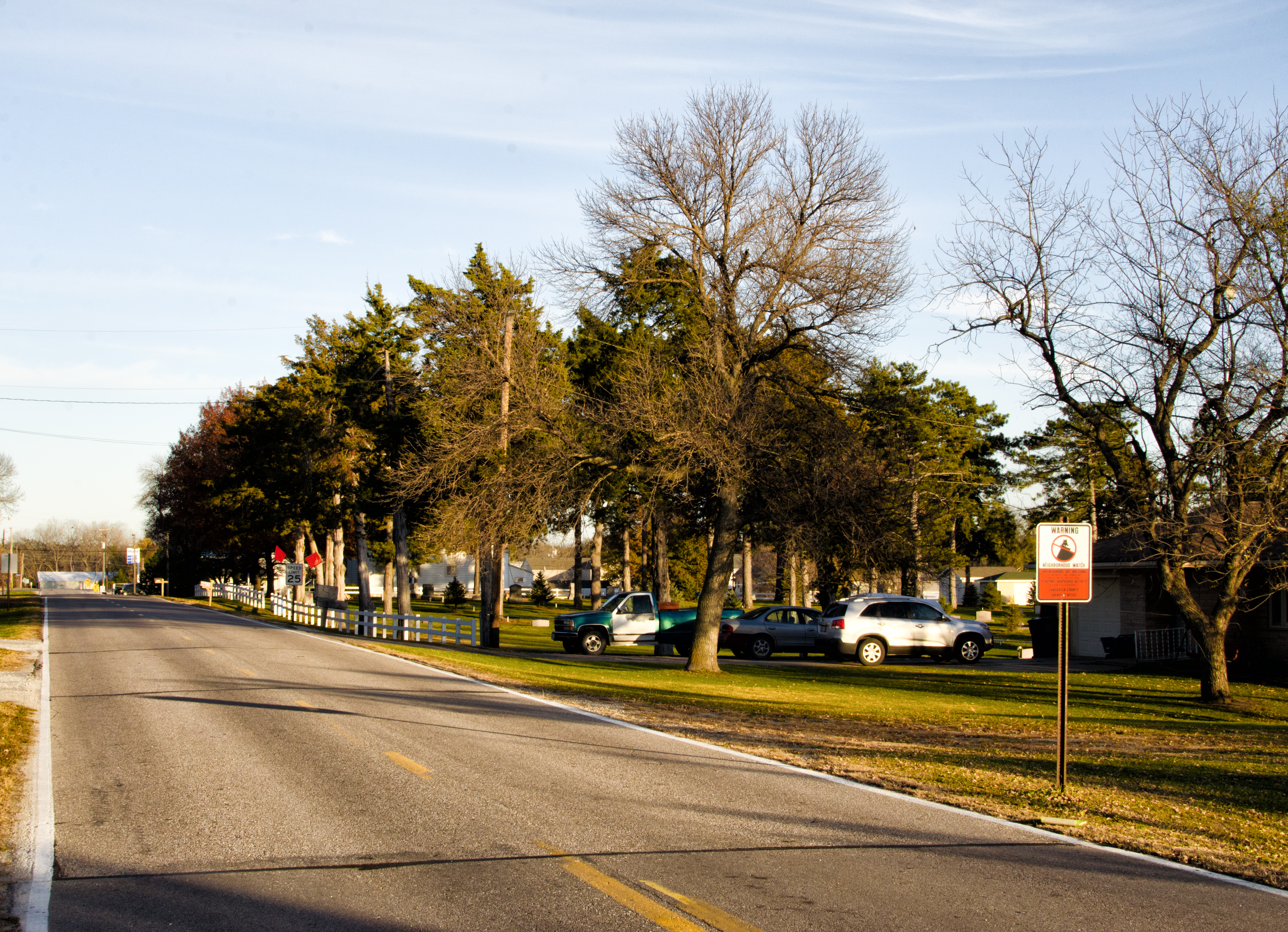
- A Road When Entering Denton, Nebraska

- Location of Denton, Nebraska
- Coordinates: 40°44′21″N 96°50′46″W
- Country: United States
- State: Nebraska
- County: Lancaster

Area
  - Total: 0.12 sq mi (0.32 km^{2})
  - Land: 0.12 sq mi (0.32 km^{2})
  - Water: 0 sq mi (0.00 km^{2})
- Elevation: 1,257 ft (383 m)

Population (2020)
  - Total: 189
  - Density: 1,544.8/sq mi (596.45/km^{2})
- Time zone: UTC-6 (Central (CST))
  - Summer (DST): UTC-5 (CDT)
- ZIP code: 68339
- Area code: 402
- FIPS code: 31-12770
- GNIS feature ID: 2398713
- Website: villageofdenton.com

Denton is a village in Lancaster County, Nebraska, United States. It is part of the Lincoln, Nebraska Metropolitan Statistical Area. The population was 189 at the 2020 census.

== History ==
Denton was established in 1871 when the Burlington & Missouri River Railroad was extended to that point. It was named for Daniel M. Denton, the original owner of the town site. Denton was incorporated in 1913. In 1930, a fire burned down many buildings in the village, creating an even worse environment for the already-struggling businesses following the stock market crash a year prior.

== Geography ==
Denton is located at 40°44′22″N 96°50′42″W (40.739530, -96.844914).

According to the United States Census Bureau, the village has a total area of 0.12 square miles (0.31 km^{2}), all land.

== Demographics ==
Historical population
Census	Pop.	Note	%±
1920	145		—
1930	114		−21.4%
1940	126		10.5%
1950	101		−19.8%
1960	94		−6.9%
1970	151		60.6%
1980	164		8.6%
1990	161		−1.8%
2000	189		17.4%
2010	190		0.5%
2020	189		−0.5%
U.S. Decennial Census

=== 2010 census ===
At the 2010 census there were 190 people, 82 households, and 51 families in the village. The population density was 1,583.3 inhabitants per square mile (611.3/km^{2}). There were 86 housing units at an average density of 716.7 units per square mile (276.7 units/km^{2}). The racial makeup of the village was 97.4% White, 1.1% African American, 1.1% Asian, and 0.5% from two or more races. Hispanic or Latino of any race were 1.6%.

Of the 82 households 25.6% had children under the age of 18 living with them, 48.8% were married couples living together, 11.0% had a female householder with no husband present, 2.4% had a male householder with no wife present, and 37.8% were non-families. 31.7% of households were one person and 8.5% were one person aged 65 or older. The average household size was 2.32 and the average family size was 2.96.

The median age in the village was 37.6 years. 24.7% of residents were under the age of 18; 3.7% were between the ages of 18 and 24; 32.1% were from 25 to 44; 24.8% were from 45 to 64; and 14.7% were 65 or older. The gender makeup of the village was 51.1% male and 48.9% female.

=== 2000 census ===
At the 2000 census there were 189 people, 77 households, and 49 families in the village. The population density was 1,334.4 inhabitants per square mile (515.2/km^{2}). There were 82 housing units at an average density of 579.0 units per square mile (223.6 units/km^{2}). The racial makeup of the village was 100.00% White. Hispanic or Latino of any race were 1.06%.

Of the 77 households 31.2% had children under the age of 18 living with them, 51.9% were married couples living together, 9.1% had a female householder with no husband present, and 35.1% were non-families. 26.0% of households were one person and 9.1% were one person aged 65 or older. The average household size was 2.45 and the average family size was 3.00.

The age distribution was 24.3% under the age of 18, 6.9% from 18 to 24, 32.8% from 25 to 44, 25.9% from 45 to 64, and 10.1% 65 or older. The median age was 36 years. For every 100 females, there were 89.0 males. For every 100 females age 18 and over, there were 98.6 males.

The median household income was $50,750, and the median family income was $55,417. Males had a median income of $32,500 versus $23,250 for females. The per capita income for the village was $21,620. About 4.7% of families and 9.0% of the population were below the poverty line, including 16.7% of those under the age of eighteen and 9.5% of those sixty five or over.

== Point of interest ==
Our Lady of Guadalupe Seminary is located there.
