= Beatitudes (disambiguation) =

The Beatitudes are a set of teachings by Jesus.

Beatitudes may also refer to:

- Beatitudes (album), an album by Bobby Watson and Curtis Lundy
- Les Béatitudes, a French oratorio by César Franck
- The Beatitudes, choral work from Arvo Pärt
- The Beatitudes, chamber music by Vladimir Martynov
- Beatitude (album), an album by Ric Ocasek
- Beatitude (magazine), a defunct poetry magazine of the Beat Generation

== See also ==
- Mount of Beatitudes, a hill in Northern Israel
- Community of the Beatitudes, a Catholic community
- Church of the Beatitudes, a Catholic church by the Sea of Galilee
- Sermon on the Mount (disambiguation)
