= Kiko Argüello =

Spanish painter (born 1939)

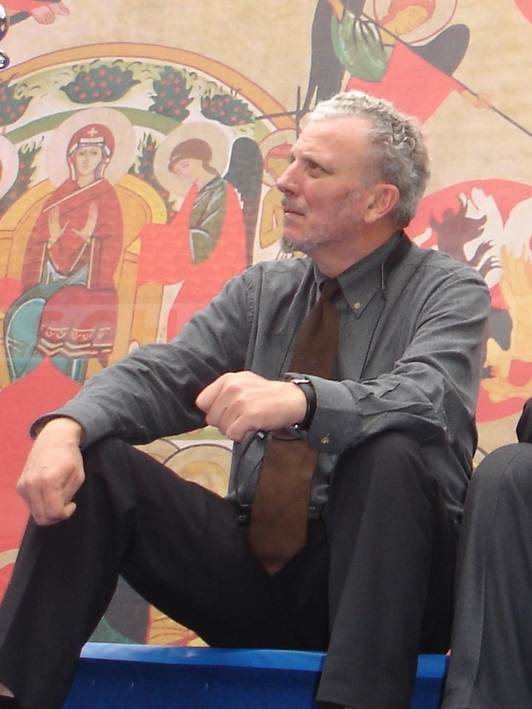
- Kiko Argüello at a Vocational Meeting in 2005.
- Born: 9 January 1939 (age 87); León, Castilla y León, Spain
- Education: Real Academia de Bellas Artes de San Fernando
- Occupation: Artist

Francisco José Gómez de Argüello y Wirtz (born January 9, 1939) is a Spanish artist and, together with Carmen Hernández and Father Mario Pezzi, founder of the Neocatechumenal Way.

== Early life ==
Argüello was born in León, he studied fine arts at the Royal Academy of San Fernando in Madrid, and in 1959 was awarded a Special National Prize for Painting. In 1964 he began the Neocatechumenal Way in the slum of Palomeras Altas in Madrid.

== Crisis and conversion ==
At the Royal Academy Argüello went through a profound existential crisis, of which he gave a vivid account in an interview. He wondered how it was possible "that we live in a world full of injustices when inside we have a desire for justice." Through his involvement with a theatre group, he "learned something of the philosophy of Sartre, (No Exit, The Flies, etc.), and in the end Sartre gives us an answer: that the world is absurd, everything is absurd, that we have a craving for justice and live in an unjust world because everything is absurd." Argüello tried to live "consciously, existentially" the "reality" of Sartrian atheism. He dedicated himself to art, won a National Prize, and appeared on television, but to his surprise "it meant absolutely nothing" to him. "In the end I asked myself: but people, how can they live if I can't?... I'd get up and say: to live, for what? To paint. And why paint? To make money. What for, if nothing satisfies me? I knew that sooner or later I'd shoot myself, I'd kill myself."

At the height of this crisis, however, Argüello read another philosopher, Bergson, "who says that intuition is a... way..., deeper than reason itself, of arriving at truth. And, surprised, I found that, deep inside, my artist's intuition did not accept the absurdity of existence; I was aware of the beauty of a tree, of the beauty of things; there is something there that can't be absurd. Then if the absurd is not the truth, if there is a reason for being... the next step was: then somebody created us.... At that moment... something in me told me that God existed,... that God loved me,... that I was a son of God. And with great surprise I found... that this God that appeared in my heart, in my deepest soul, was Jesus Christ, the Jesus Christ of the Catholic Church."

Summing up this period of his life during his meeting with Pope John Paul II in Rome on November 2, 1980, Argüello said, "God permitted me to experience the absurd – atheism – until He had mercy." After his conversion he determined to dedicate his life to Jesus and to the Church. He began to frequent catechism courses and for years he trained as a Catechist with the Cursillos movement. Convinced that Jesus is present in the suffering of the poorest of people and inspired by the example of Charles de Foucauld, Argüello abandoned his studies and career as a painter. Taking only his guitar, crucifix, and Bible, he left to live amongst the poor in a wooden shack in Palomeras Altas, a slum on the outskirts of Madrid.

== Co-founder ==
It was among the poor of Palomeras that Kiko encountered Carmen Hernández, a graduate in chemistry and theology, through her sister who was rescuing homosexuals & prostitutes. Thanks to the liturgist Priest Farnés Schrerer, they got in touch with the liturgical renewal of the Second Vatican Council and the centrality of the Easter Vigil.

== Neocatechumenal Way ==
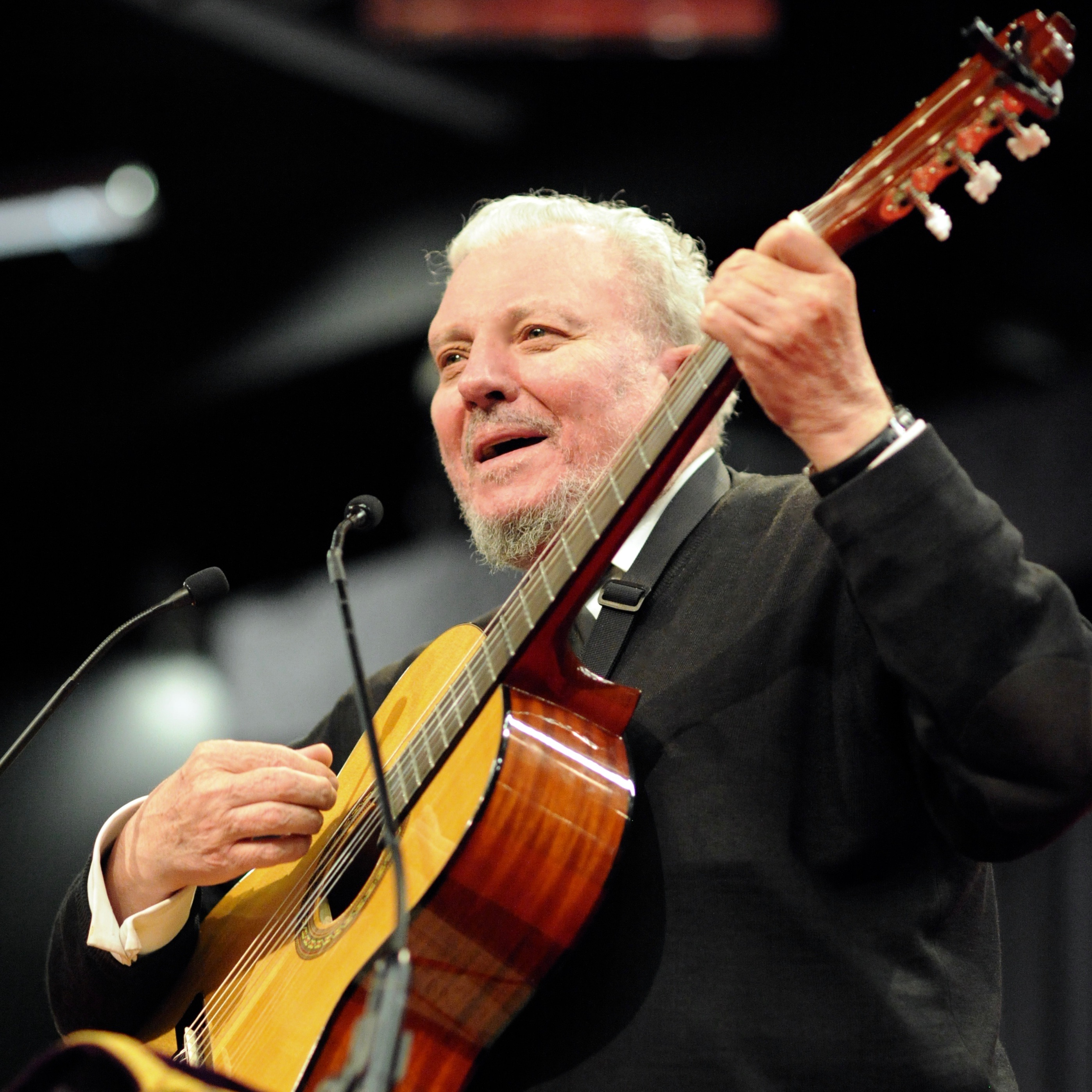
Kiko in Montreal, Canada (March 2017)

After more than thirty years of work in more than a hundred countries, this Neocatechumenate was recognized by Pope John Paul II as an "effective means of Catholic formation for society and the present time." Kiko Argüello, Maria Ascension and the Italian Priest Mario Pezzi are presently the international team responsible for the Neocatechumenal Way worldwide. Its statutes were approved ad experimentum for a period of five years in June 2002. The Statutes, with minimal changes, were given final approval by the Church on June 13, 2008. Today the Neocatechumenal Way is present in more than 110 countries in all the six continents, in nearly 900 dioceses, and in around 8,000 parishes with more than 30,000 communities, 19,000 of which are found in Europe, 10,000 being in Italy.

Fruits of the Neocatechumenal Way were recognized by various Catholic universities and institutes through conferring of honorary degrees on Kiko Argüello. On May 13, 2009, he was invested with an honorary degree by the Pontifical John Paul II Institute for Studies on Marriage and Family. The institute underlined "the strong commitment of the Neocatechumenal Way on family issues" by its emphasis on "the experience of the 'domestic celebration' with which it sends families on a mission." It also pointed out the value of the lay group's "promotion, together with other ecclesiastical organizations, of major initiatives in support of the family," especially the "Family Day in Italy and the 2007 Feast of the Holy Family in Madrid."

On June 26, 2013, Argüello received an honorary degree from the John Paul II Catholic University of Lublin. The University invested him with the honorary doctorate in recognition of his contribution to the renewal of the Church following the indications of the Second Vatican Council, underlining the fruits of the Neocatechumenal Way in the evangelization and in defending the values of human dignity and Christian family.

On May 15, 2015, Kiko Argüello together with Carmen Hernández received his third honorary doctorate from the Catholic University of America. During the ceremony, the president of the University John H. Garvey quoted the words of Pope Francis addressed to Kiko and Carmen, saying: "I thank you for the immense good you are doing for the whole Church." The doctorate was awarded mainly "for their devotion to the poor, which has brought so many into communion with Christ and the Catholic faith."

== Architecture, paintings and the liturgy ==
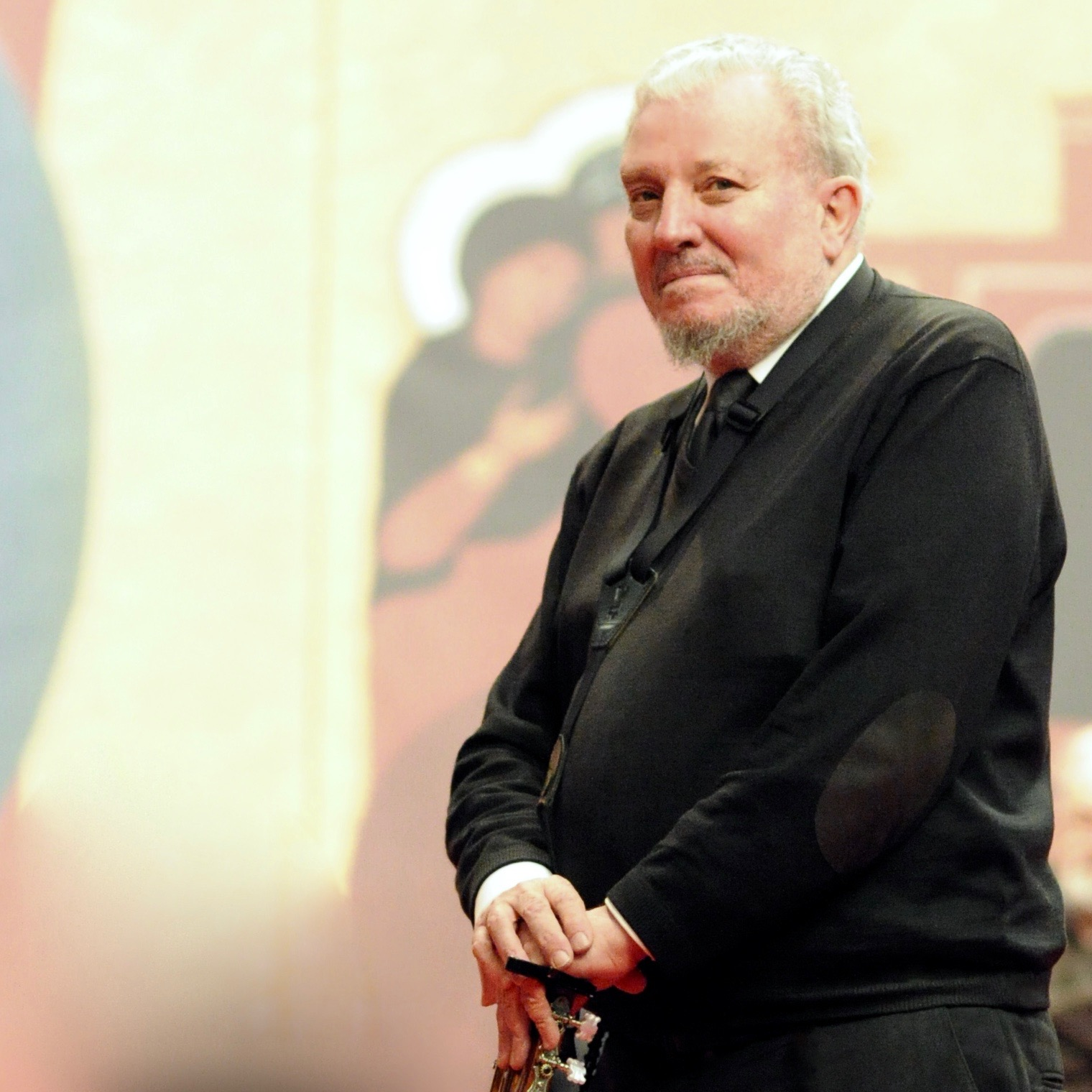
Kiko in Montreal, Canada (March 2017)

Through the years, Kiko Argüello has painted a large number of religious paintings, in several cities and localities, cathedrals, and churches. He is also a psalmist and has composed well over a hundred and eighty songs of a religious nature, for use in Neocatechumenal Way celebrations and liturgies. Thus an aesthetic renewal has taken place through paintings, architecture, music, songs, and liturgical ornaments. In Rome, Kiko has painted huge murals, in the crypt of the church dedicated to the Canadian Martyrs (Ascension of Our Lord into Heaven), in the Church of Saint Frances Cabrini (Holy Trinity) and also in its crypt, and in the Church of Saint Aloysius Gonzaga (The Apparition of the Risen Christ to Saint Thomas). In Porto San Giorgio, the centre of the Neocatechumenal Way, near the Sanctuary of Our Lady of Loreto, the International Centre for the New Evangelisation has been built according to Argüello's design. He has set up as well a huge cross and an abstract painting of the Creation. He has also designed many of the 75 Redemptoris Mater Seminaries, especially those of Newark and Denver (USA), Rome, and Macerata (Italy), as well as the Neocatechumenal Centre in Madrid, amongst others.

In Florence, he has painted the "Corona Misterica" behind the altar of the Church of San Bartolomeo in Tuto, and has designed, together with the Italian architect Alberto Durante, a Catechumenium (a structure encompassing several halls, intended to hold liturgies by the Neocatechumenal Communities and the Diocese).

In the Parish of the Holy Trinity in Piacenza, he has painted one of the largest murals in the world (500 square metres). It represents the Glory of Christ Pantocrator, Resurrected, on a golden background. It was inaugurated in the presence of the local Bishop, an official of the Orthodox Church of Moscow and three Eastern Patriarchs.

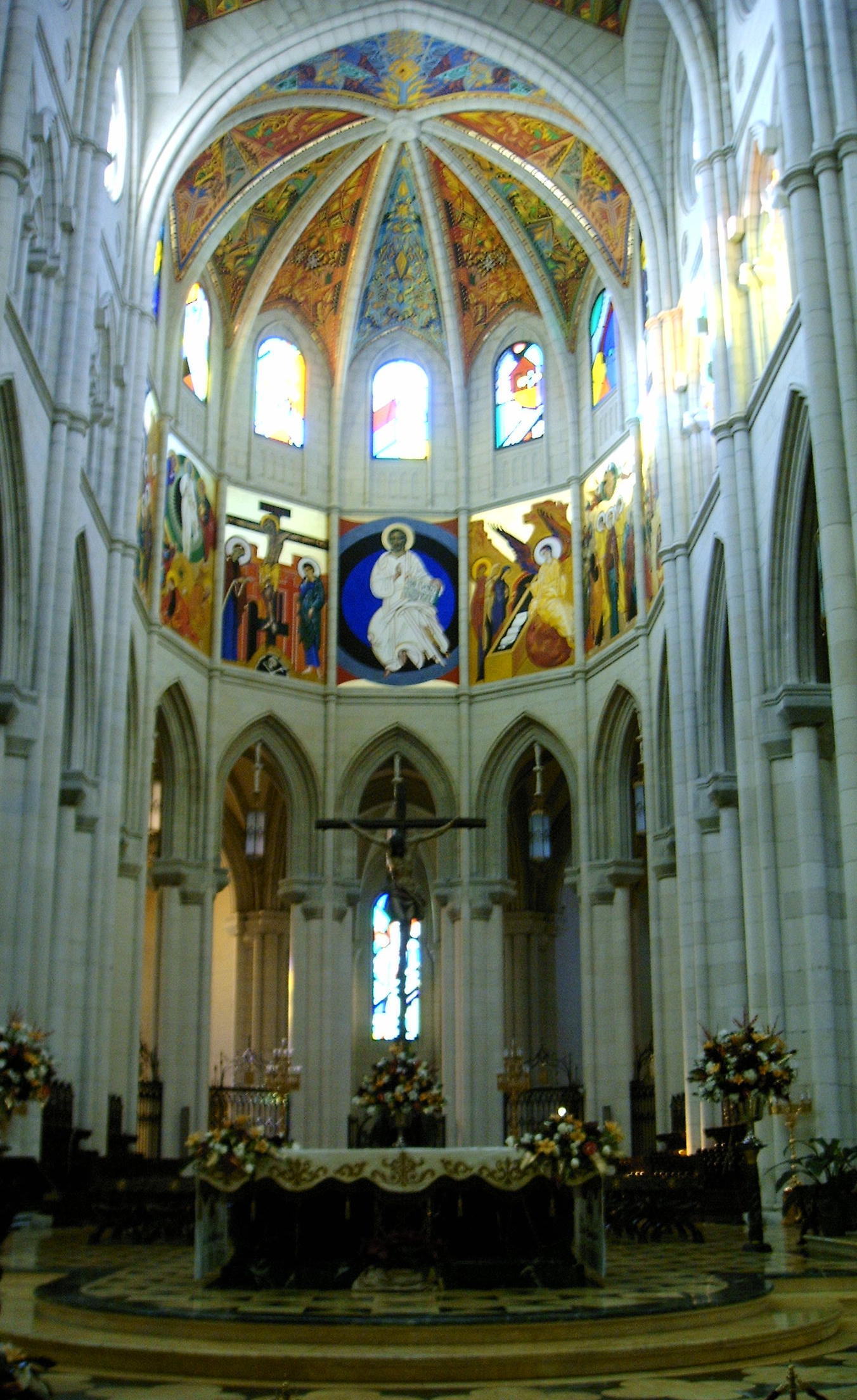
Interior of the Cathedral of Saint Mary the Royal of La Almudena, Madrid

In Madrid, Kiko has also designed the architecture of various Cathecumeniums and has painted different themes in the Parishes of El Transito (The Dormition of Our Lady), of Saint Joseph (The Transfiguration), of La Paloma (he designed and painted the chapel dedicated to Pentecost); and at Saint Catherine Labouré (where he designed the architecture of the church together with the German architect Gottfried Klaiber) he painted the Story of Salvation on a golden background all around the temple. Additionally, in the parish of San Frontis de Zamora, he painted a round mural depicting the Birth of Jesus, his Baptism and his Resurrection.

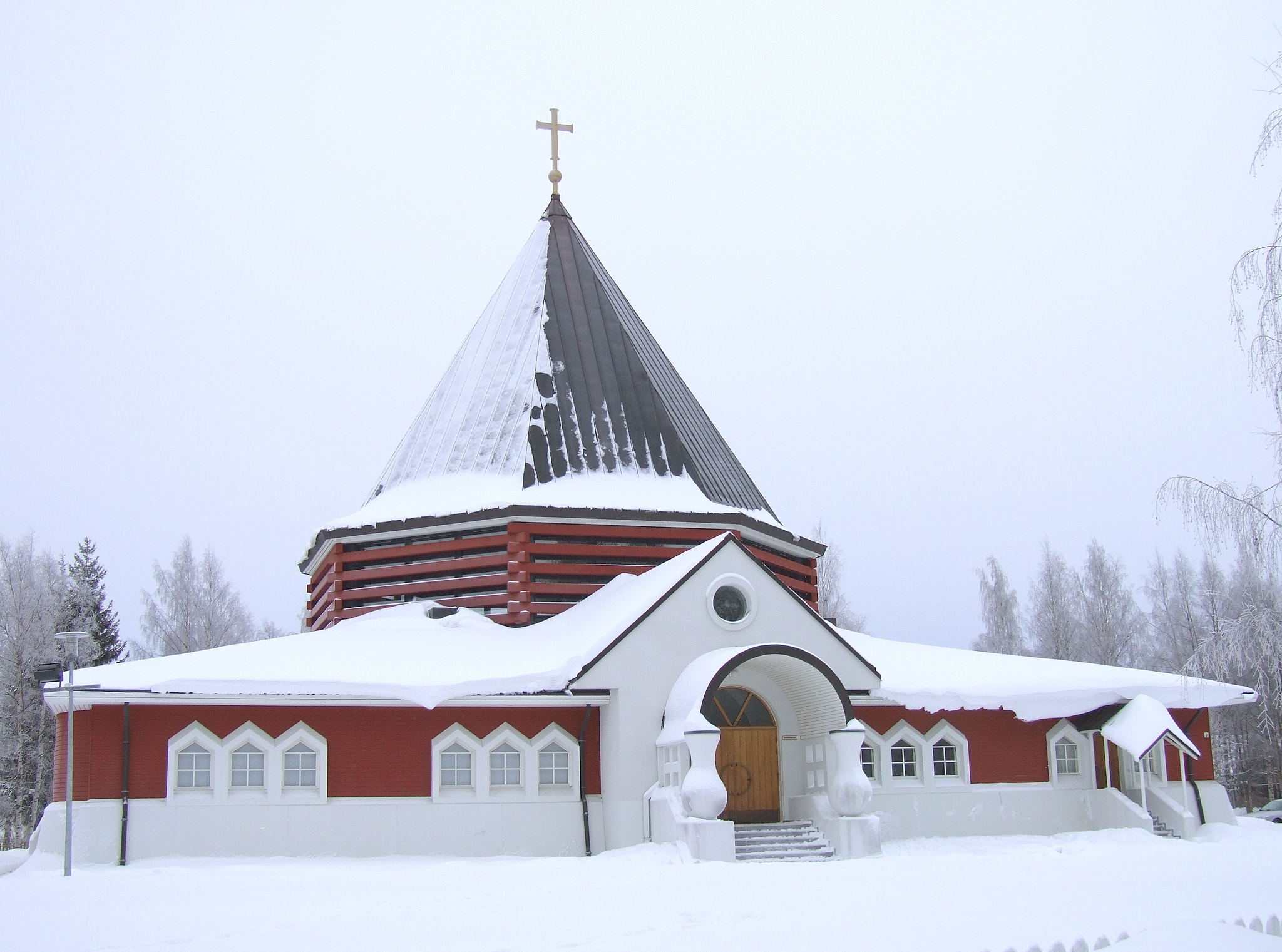
The church of the Holy Family of Nazareth Parish in Oulu, built by the Neocatechumenal Way. February 2006

In Finland, in the city of Oulu, he designed, together with the Swiss architect Gabriele Geronzi, the first parish church in a zone where there had never before been a Roman Catholic church.

In Israel he designed, together with a team of architects (Antonio Abalos and Guillermo Soler, Spanish; Mattia Del Prete, Italian; and the above-mentioned Gottfried Klaiber), the grand building of the Domus Galilaeae (a centre of biblical formation and place to receive pilgrims to the Holy Land), where he painted the Last Judgement that decorates the church of this new building.

Just before the royal wedding of Crown Prince Felipe of Spain, Kiko was commissioned by the Cardinal and Bishop to paint the interior of the Almudena Cathedral of the Archdiocese of Madrid and to replace the stained glass windows in time for the said wedding, in 2004. This work has turned out to be controversial, since it had previously been assigned by an open international call to the artist Manuel Ortega in January 1988. Another issue arose when identical copies of the icons were found in a church in Arroyo Hondo, near Santo Domingo. Kiko is the original artist and his work was duplicated in both the Cathedral and the said church. Those paintings, and many others, have been reproduced in numerous seminaries and churches and in the Domus Galilaeae Center.

== See also ==
- Carmen Hernández
