= Universidad Católica San Antonio de Murcia =

University in Murcia, Spain

Catholic University Saint Anthony
- Universidad Católica San Antonio
- Motto: In libertatem vocati From Galatians 5:13, RSV: “Called to freedom."
- Type: Private
- Established: 1996
- Students: 21.386
- Location: Murcia, Spain
- Affiliations: Roman Catholic Diocese of Cartagena
- Website: www.ucam.edu

Universidad Católica San Antonio de Murcia (UCAM) is a private Catholic university with campuses in Murcia and Cartagena, Spain.

Founded in 1996 by José Luis Mendoza Pérez, the university offers undergraduate, postgraduate, and doctoral programs across disciplines including health sciences, engineering, business, social sciences, and sports science. UCAM is known for its emphasis on Catholic values, internationalization, and elite sports partnerships, and maintains collaborations with institutions and organizations worldwide.

It is owned by the San Antonio University Foundation which, as the university, is named after its patron saint, San Antonio de Padua.

== History ==
In 1978 Pope John Paul II promulgated the Apostolic Constitution Ex Corde Ecclesiae, which made allowance, in Article 3.3, for the establishment of Catholic universities by laypersons. By the wording of this document, UCAM the plan of founder and president José Luis Mendoza, was the first such university to be established under the new conditions presented in the Article. Mendoza, a strongly homophobic member of the Neocatechumenal Way, the Pontifical Council for the Family and father of 14 children with ties to the far-right party Vox, served as president of the university.

At its establishment in 1996, UCAM attended approximately 600 students. As of 2026, its students were 21,386.

UCAM's stance toward the secular world is informed by this notion, as can be seen in the Letter from the President introducing English-speaking foreign students to UCAM. According to Mendoza, the university has:

"a vocation both to teach and evangelise in the academic, scientific and cultural world and provide an instrument in Faith to solve the many questions and problems of contemporary society and in this way contribute to social, cultural and human development and progress".

Nowadays, the university has a wide range of national and international partnerships with institutions such as EU Business School, Sevilla FC, CDEI Business School, CESAE Business & Tourism School, etc.

== Campus ==
The university has its main campuses located in Murcia and Cartagena. It also offers training in Madrid and remotely, with a multitude of examination venues nationwide.

It is built on an approximate area of 25,000 square meters (14,500 built) and will soon have an annexation of another 200,000 for gardens, parking, sports facilities and university residence. It is located 4 km from the urban center of the city of Murcia, in the Los Jerónimos Monastery (18th century), which, together with its baroque church, is declared a National Historic-Artistic Monument and forms the so-called Los Jerónimos Campus, headquarters of UCAM. The campus consists of large and bright classrooms, Library, Assembly Hall, Meeting and Work Rooms, Laboratories, Computer, Multimedia and Language Classrooms and Cafeteria-Dining Room.

Other UCAM headquarters and schools, complementary to the Los Jerónimos Campus are:

- Cartagena Campus
- VET Institute
- COCO School of Design
- UCAM Online
- UCAM Spanish Sports University
- John Paul II Institute

== Studies offered ==
Faculty of Law

- Bachelor’s Degree in Criminology
- Bachelor's Degree in Law
- Bachelor’s Degree in Labour Relations and Human Resources

Faculty of Economics and Business

- Bachelor’s Degree in Business Administration and Management
- Bachelor's Degree in Business Administration (in English)
- Bachelor's Degree in Marketing and Commercial Management
- Bachelor's Degree in Tourism
- Bachelor's Degree in Tourism (Bilingual)

UCAM Polytechnic School

- Bachelor's Degree in Principles of Architecture
- Bachelor's Degree in Civil Engineering
- Bachelor's Degree in Building Services Engineering
- Bachelor's Degree in Computer Engineering
- Bachelor's Degree in Telecommunication Technology Engineering

Faculty of Medicine

- Bachelor’s Degree in Medicine
- Bachelor’s Degree in Dentistry
- Bachelor´s Degree in Dentistry (in English)
- Bachelor's Degree in Psychology
- Bachelor's Degree in Psychology (in English)

Faculty of Sport

- Bachelor's Degree in Physical Activity and Sport Sciences
- Bachelor's Degree in Physical Activity and Sport Sciences (in English)
- Degree in Dance

Faculty of Nursing

- Bachelor’s Degree in Nursing

Faculty of Pharmacy and Nutrition

- Bachelor's Degree in Biotechnology
- Bachelor’s Degree in Pharmacy
- Bachelor's Degree in Pharmacy (in English)
- Bachelor's Degree in Food Science and Technology
- Bachelor's Degree in Human Nutrition and Dietetics
- Bachelor's Degree in Gastronomy

Faculty Physiotherapy, Occupational Therapy and Podiatry

- Bachelor's Degree in Physiotherapy
- Bachelor's Degree in Podiatry
- Bachelor's Degree in Occupational TherapyFaculty of Education
- Bachelor's Degree in Modern Languages
- Bachelor's Degree in Modern Languages (in English)
- Bachelor's Degree in Translation and Interpretation
- Bachelor's Degree in Early Childhood Education
- Bachelor's Degree in Primary Education

Faculty of Communication

- Bachelor's Degree in Audiovisual Communication
- Bachelor's Degree in Journalism
- Bachelor's Degree in Advertising and Public Relations

Furthermore, UCAM has entered into academic and double degree programme agreements with prestigious business schools and universities, including the following:

- EADIC Engineering, Training & Development Solutions
- IEBS Digital School
- Anahuac University in Mexico City
- Autonomous University of Chile
- UPTC, Pedagogical and Technological University of Colombia

The average tuition fees for students are €7,800 per year, ranging from a minimum of €4,000 to a maximum of €14,300 depending on the degree course.

== Ranking ==
In 2017 UCAM was ranked first in the European Union ranking U-Multirank, as the best university in Europe to study Computer Engineering and Psychology, standing out among the 850 universities evaluated, and also coming in at 16th place among Spanish universities – first in the Region of Murcia. The Bachelor's Degree in Civil Engineering was ranked sixth in Europe.

In 2019, the Times Higher Education ranking placed the university as the 37th in Spain in terms of teaching quality and positioned it 151-200 in the Europe Teaching Rankings 2019. Furthermore, UCAM was awarded an overall score of 4 stars in the QS Stars Rating and obtained the highest rating (5 stars) in the categories of teaching, internationalisation, social responsibility and inclusivity.

In 2023, the prestigious company specialised in the analysis of higher education institutions around the world, Quacquarelli Symonds (QS), gave UCAM a special distinction for its teaching model, the inclusivity of its university campuses, its internationalisation, online training and commitment to its students, as well as for its high score in employability. There are only 7 Spanish higher education institutions with this QS Stars Rating.

== Research ==
UCAM promotes theological and philosophical research, and thus areas such as anthropology, social doctrine, ethics, bioethics and humanities play a leading role in all degree programmes. International conferences are organised every year. In some of these, illustrious personalities from the religious, scientific and political world have taken part. Examples include the then Cardinal Prefect of the Dicastery for the Doctrine of the Faith, Joseph Ratzinger (Pope Benedict XVI) or the former head of the Spanish government José María Aznar; Kiko Argüello, founder of the Neocatechumenal Way; Javier Echevarría Rodríguez, prelate of Opus Dei; the journalist José María García and the orthopaedic surgeon Pedro Guillén.

Other research is focused on the field of nutrition and health, in collaboration with other institutions. There are currently 17 official doctoral programmes and different lines of research. Among the research programmes, the international doctorate in collaboration with the FOM - Fachhochschule fuer Oekonomie und Management of Germany is worth mentioning.

== Sports ==
University sport

UCAM has several Olympic medallists such as Mireia Belmonte, Saul Craviotto, Carolina Marín, Ruth Beitia, Lidia Valentín or Joel González. In fact, 11 of the 17 medals won by Spain at the 2016 Olympic Games in Rio de Janeiro belong to athletes with UCAM scholarships.

In university competitions, that is, those in which only teams made up of students enrolled in official university degrees by ANECA compete, UCAM has teams in practically all disciplines11 and has been the leader in recent editions of sporting disciplines such as the Spanish University Male Basketball Championship and the Nautical Canoeing Championship.

Federated sport

UCAM sponsors 16 federated teams.12 These teams include the Club Baloncesto UCAM Murcia (Basketball), the UCAM Murcia Club de Fútbol (Football) and UCAM Voley Murcia (Volleyball).

Esports

There is a section on esports. Outstanding achievements include a League of Legends championship in 2021.

== Image ==
The symbols of the Universidad Católica San Antonio are described in Article 9 of its statutes:

- ‘The coat of arms of the University is a double oval inside which the inscription ‘Universidad Católica San Antonio’ above, and the inscription ‘A.D. MCMXCVI’, below –which is the year of its foundation– can be found. Inside the double oval, at the top, we can find the motto of the University, ‘In Libertatem Vocati’, by St Paul the Apostle, and the kneeling image of St Anthony of Padua with the Child Jesus in his arms in the centre.’
- ‘The flag of the University is sea green, sign of the theological virtue of hope, with the coat of arms of the University in it.’

== Iradio UCAM ==
Iradio UCAM is the radio station of the Universidad Católica San Antonio de Murcia, a project promoted by the Faculty of Communication since the 2009/10 academic year.

== Evangelisation and volunteering ==
UCAM hosts the John Paul II International Institute for Charity and Volunteering sponsored by the Pontifical Council Cor Unum, which organises a university work campus in Pachacútec, a town in the Ventanilla District (Peru).

== See also ==
- Universidad Popular de Cartagena
