= Carmen Hernández =

Spanish Catholic catechist

Servant of God Carmen Hernández
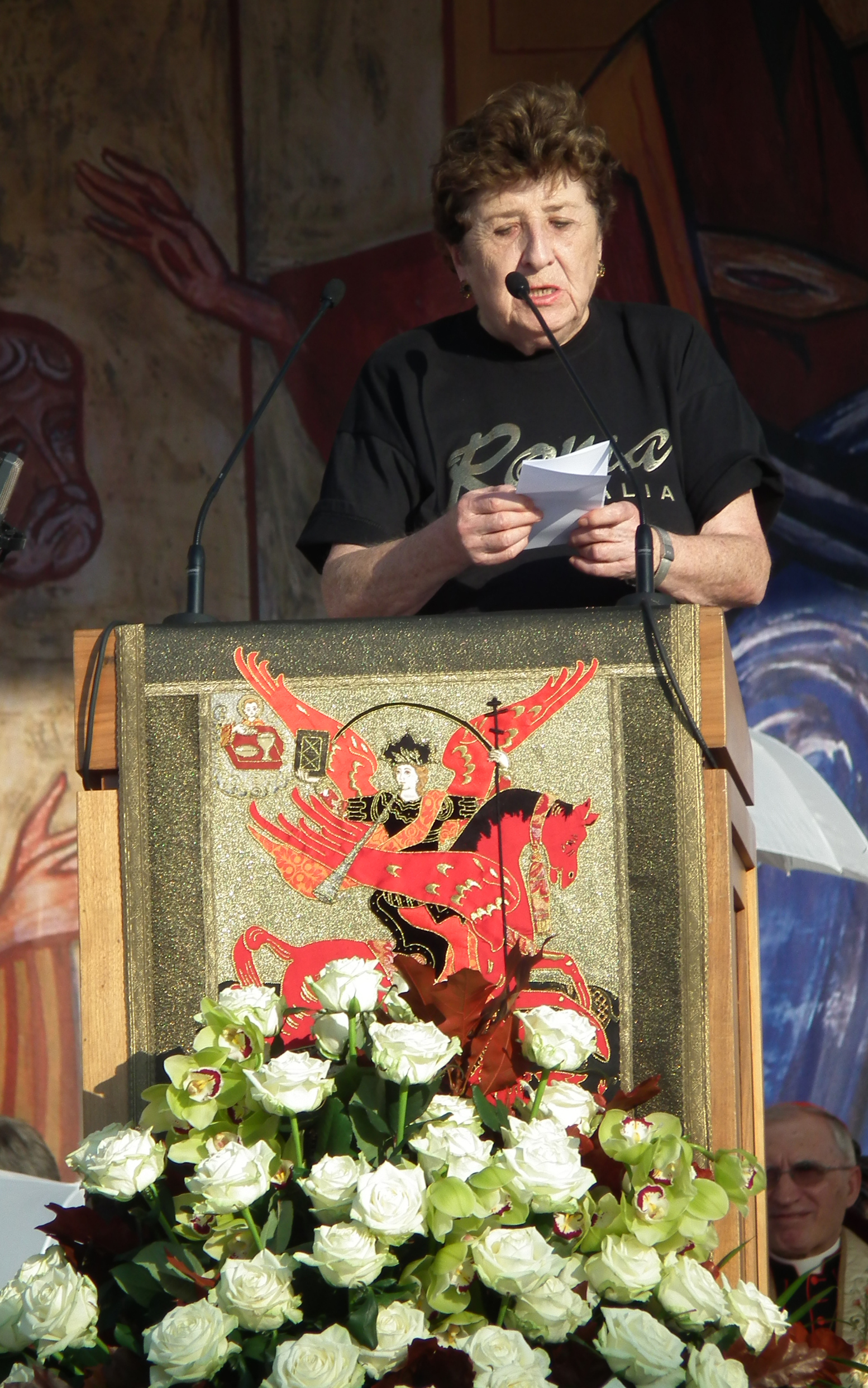
- Carmen Hernandez in the vocational meeting of the World Youth Day in Madrid.

Catechist
- Born: 24 November 1930; Ólvega, Soria, Spain
- Died: 19 July 2016 (aged 85); Madrid, Spain
- Patronage: Neocatechumenal way

María del Carmen Hernández Barrera (24 November 1930 in Ólvega – 19 July 2016 in Madrid) was a Spanish Catholic catechist and the co-founder of the Neocatechumenal Way. Her cause for beatification has been initiated.

== Biography ==
Carmen Hernández was born on 24 November 1930 in Ólvega, Spain, but she moved with her family at a very young age to Tudela, Spain where she spent most of her childhood. When she was 15 years old, her family moved to Madrid. As a teenager, she resolved to be a missionary and wanted to go to India, but her father would not permit it.

She obtained a degree in chemistry in Madrid by the age of 21. As soon as she could, she fulfilled her desire to become a missionary by joining the Missionaries of Christ Jesus, from whom she received a degree in theology. However, in 1962, she was expelled from the order. Thereafter, she lived for two years in Israel to deepen her understanding of the Bible and catechesis, before returning to Spain.

Inspired by Charles de Foucauld, she devoted herself to the poor and marginalized in Palomeras Altas, one of the many shanty towns in postwar Madrid. Through her sister, who was rescuing homosexuals & prostitutes, she met Kiko Argüello who invited her to join the Cursillo but she refused, and together they formed the Neocatechumenal Way in 1964. Hernandez always rejected the term "movement" because she hoped it would bless and revitalize the whole Catholic Church.

Hernandez continued to be one of the primary leaders of the Neocatechumenal Way throughout her life, along with Argüello and Mario Pezzi. The Catholic University of America awarded both Hernández and Argüello honorary doctorate in theology in 2015 in recognition of "their devotion to the poor and the good work they have done for the Church". The University specifically recognized Hernández' knowledge of Christian scripture and church history as having been essential for the success of Neocatechumenal Way.

She died on 19 July 2016 in Madrid at age 85. At her death, Pope Francis voiced appreciation for the witness of her faith and encouraged members of the Neocatechumenal Way to continue her work.

Hernandez was described as courageous, determined, and blunt.

On 19 July 2021 on the 5th year of the death of Carmen the members of the Neo Catechumenal Way have requested for the opening of the cause of beatification and canonization of its co-founder.

== See also ==
- List of Servants of God
