= Neocatechumenal Way =

Catholic program

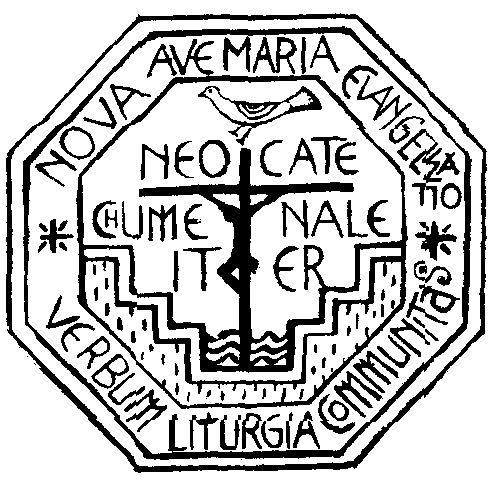
- Logo of the Neocatechumenal Way
- Abbreviation: NCW
- Formation: 1964
- Founders: Kiko Argüello and Carmen Hernández
- Type: Program
- Headquarters: Madrid, Rome
- Website: neocatechumenaleiter.org/en

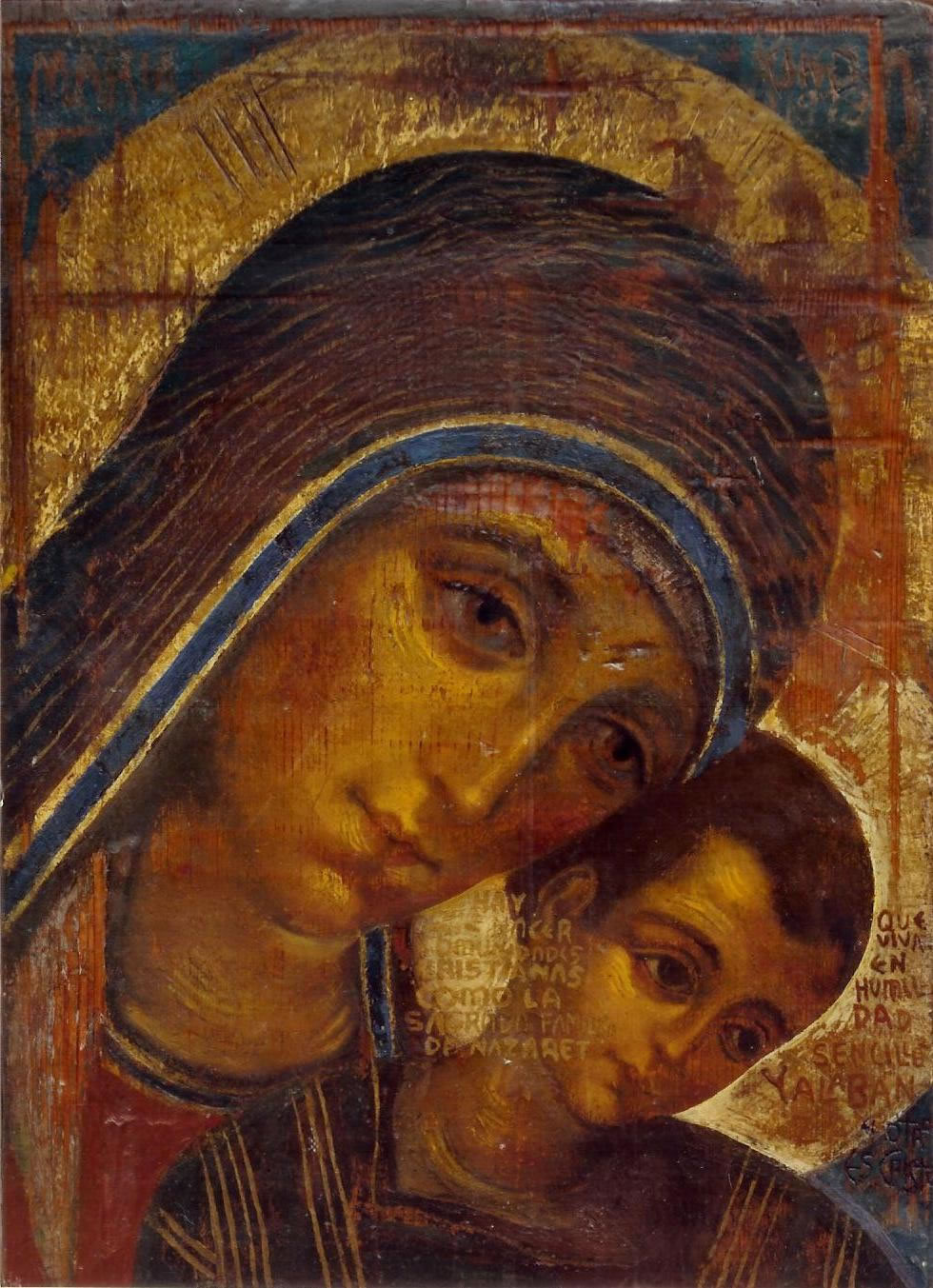
Icon of the Virgin Mary by Kiko Argüello, the Spanish painter who initiated the Neocatechumenal Way.

The Neocatechumenal Way, also known as the Neocatechumenate, or NCW is a program in the Catholic Church. It is inspired by the catechumenate of the early Catholic Church where converts from paganism were prepared for baptism through a process of faith formation. This post-baptismal formation is intended to help deepen the faith for adults that have already been baptized, and provides basic instruction to those that are far from the Church. This itinerary of formation adapts the rites of the Rite of Christian Initiation of Adults (RCIA) for those that have already been baptized, without repeating the sacrament of baptism.

The Neocatechumenate began in Madrid in 1964 by Kiko Argüello and Carmen Hernández. It is implemented in small, parish-based communities of up to 50 people. In 2007 there were around 20,000 such communities throughout the world, with an estimated one million Catholics following the itinerary. The Neocatechumenal Way has always placed a strong emphasis on New Evangelization, administering over 100 missionary diocesan seminaries, as well as sending families in mission around the world, to be a Catholic presence in secularized places.

== Early history ==
In the early 1960s, Francisco "Kiko" Argüello moved to the shanty town of 'Palomeras Altas' in Vallecas, Madrid, and gathered a community of Romani people and marginalised poor. He was soon joined by Carmen Hernández, who linked the community to the theological and liturgical zeitgeist surrounding the Second Vatican Council, and won the support of the archbishop of Madrid Casimiro Morcillo González, who had been a relator during sessions of the Council.

Gradually, the community's approach was codified in a "catechetical synthesis" referred to as the "tripod," "Word of God-Liturgy-Community", with the stated aim of seeking to lead people to fraternal communion and mature faith.

The movement spread through the Archdiocese of Madrid and to other Spanish dioceses. In 1968, it began to spread beyond Spain when Argüello and Hernández arrived in Rome and settled in the Borghetto Latino.

== Leadership and governance ==
The community of Neocatechumens was led by the "International Responsible Team of the Way": Argüello, Hernández, and Fr. Mario Pezzi, a priest of the Diocese of Rome, until Hernández's death, in 2016. Under the terms of the 2007 statute, the three members of this leadership team will remain in place for life, after which an electoral college of senior neocatechumenal catechists will elect a new team which, with the approval of the Pontifical Council for the Laity, will have a mandate to lead the Way for a period of seven years until new elections are held. The Neocatechumenal Way announced on 13 February 2018 that María Ascensión Romero had been chosen to join the leadership team.

"They contribute by forming the first neocatechumenal communities of a parish, and are supposed to maintain regular contact with the Bishops of the diocese in which they work; the itinerant teams preserve a constant link with the responsibles of the Neocatechumenal Way, visiting periodically the communities they catechized and taking care of the development of the Neocatechumenal Way in the territory assigned to them, being fully faithful to the charism given to the initiators and obedient to the local Ordinary."

== Nature and mission of the Neocatechumenal communities ==
The Neocatechumenal Way as it has been approved by the Holy See is a "Post baptismal catechumenate at the service of the Bishops as a form of diocesan implementation of Christian initiation and of ongoing education in faith, in accordance with the indications of the Second Vatican Council and the Magisterium of the Church”. From the initial catechesis, it typically takes several years and passing through stages of faith formation in the local communities, until a member reaches the "renewal of the baptismal vows."

It is implemented in dioceses under the jurisdiction of the bishop and the guidance of the Responsible Team of the Way “according to the lines proposed by its initiators”.

=== Missionary activity ===
Responding to secularization, the Neocatechumenal Way has implemented "families in mission" – families serving to establish the presence of the Catholic Church in countries where there is none (this is referred to as Implantatio Ecclesiae) or to strengthen the presence of Catholic communities in particularly difficult areas.

On 12 January 2006, about 200 families met with Pope Benedict XVI, asking for a missionary mandate before beginning their mission to France, Belgium, Germany and China – bringing the number of families in mission to more than five-hundred.

In March 2008 the Way met with nine cardinals and 160 European bishops at the Domus Galilaeae International Center on the Mount of Beatitudes in Galilee. Christoph Cardinal Schönborn said that during "the last 40 years Europe has said ‘no’ to its future three times: in 1968 when it rejected 'Humanae Vitae'; then, 20 years later, with the legalization of abortion; and today with homosexual marriages." He called the Neocatechumenal Way an "answer of the Holy Spirit to this situation." A joint declaration from the bishops said, "Here we have an important proposal, the proposal of the Neocatechumenal Way, which is to renew the life of the family."

On 10 January 2009, Benedict XVI met with over 10,000 people for a celebration marking the 40th anniversary of the Neocatechumenal Way in Rome. From this celebration several whole communities were sent on mission, along with itinerant catechists, mission families, and the Missio Ad Gentes (a newer form of mission that sends three to five families to a particular area at the request of the bishop).

In March 2019, the Neocatechumenal Way acquired the property of a 5173-square-meter part of the Mount of Olives at Jerusalem, in which they plan to build up a new international center named Domus Jerusalem.

=== World Youth Day Pilgrimages & Vocational Meetings ===
Approximately every three to four years, the World Youth Day has been organized by the Roman Catholic Church, during which the Pope summons youths from all over the world to a chosen city. The Way has been an active supporter of these and individual areas organize pilgrimages to the city.

During the pilgrimage event, young members of the Neocatechumenal Way meet with Argüello for a "Vocational meeting" where 'vocational calls" are performed. In Sydney (2008), for example, approximately 1,500 men answered the call for the priesthood and 850 young women stood up to show their willingness to enter the consecrated life, and in Bonn (2005) around 1,500 young men and another 900 young women answered the call. These young men and women begin a process of discernment in their own dioceses and communities, which may lead to priesthood (most of the priestly vocations go to a "Redemptoris Mater" seminary) or consecrated life.

=== The Neocatechumenal Way in the Eastern Rites and the Holy Land ===
During the Neocatechumenal Way vocational meeting held near the Sea of Galilee following Pope Benedict XVI's visit to the Holy Land in May 2009, Arguello described the Way's situation in the Holy Land. There are seven communities in the Latin Church, in Jaffa, Tel Aviv, Jerusalem, Nazareth, Bethlehem and Cana. In March 2000, the Way opened its Domus Galilaeae formation center on the slopes of the Mount of Beatitudes in Israel. The facility houses a seminary and is used for studies and retreat, Christian seminars and conventions.

In February 2007, bishops of the Holy Land addressed a letter in which they ask to the Neocatechumenal Way "to take place in the heart of the parish in which you announce the Word of God, avoiding to form a separated group", to root believers "in the parishes and in the liturgical traditions in which they have lived for generations", and that all Eucharistic celebrations would be presided by the parish priest. The document stated that the liturgical rite has preserved the Christian faith through the history of their nations and it was "like an identity card, not just a way like another to pray" in the Church.

In June 2007, Melkite archbishop Elias Chacour proposed the establishment of a new "branch" of the Neocatechumenal Way for the Eastern Catholic Churches, Archbp. Chacour stated in his message that he searched for "someone or some community to preach the Good News to my parishioners" as an answer to proselytism of the sects, and that the Neocatechumenal Way is an answer. A spokesman for the Way reported the letter to ZENIT, saying that "We share the sense of urgency expressed by Archbishop Chacour to evangelize 'the living stones' in the land of the Lord."

The seal of Redemptoris Mater seminaries

=== The Redemptoris Mater Seminaries ===
The Way also operates several seminaries dubbed Redemptoris Mater seminaries which combines the priestly formation found in a seminary with the Christian formation received in a neocatechumenal community. Potential candidates often undergo a time of "Pre-Vocational Formation" before entering the seminary, which operates somewhat in the manner of a pre-med course, designed to prepare, nourish, and preserve their vocations. The intent was to establish a seminary that was both international, i.e. with vocations coming from different nations, and missionary, i.e. upon ordination, the priests are available to go wherever their ordinary sends them. In 1988, the first Redemptoris Mater Seminary was established in Rome by Ugo Cardinal Poletti.

== The Statutes and the Catechetical Directory ==
In 1997 Pope John Paul II "encouraged [Argüello and Hernández] to examine their thirty-year experience of the Way, and to formalize it with a written statute," and Joseph Cardinal Ratzinger urged the drafting of the Statutes as "a very important step that will open the way to the formal juridical recognition by the Church, and giving you a further guarantee of the authenticity of your charism" The Statutes drafted in response were approved ad experimentum for five years in 2002, and on June 13, 2008, Stanislaw Cardinal Rylko published a decree containing the definitive approval of the statutes of the Neocatechumenal Way.

The Statutes describe the nature of the Way and regulate its charism and specific tasks within the Church. Through them the Neocatechumenal Way was endowed with "public juridical personality" status. The Way is thus closely governed by an ecclesiastical authority, performs entrusted functions "in the name of the church," and has no material goods of its own.

After thorough examination by various Vatican dicasteries, on December 26, 2010, the Pontifical Council for the Laity approved the text of the catecheses which are handed on to neo-catechumens during their itinerary. Pope Benedict XVI praised the approval: "With these ecclesiastical seals, the Lord confirms today and entrusts to you again this precious instrument that is the Way, so that you can, in filial obedience to the Holy See and to the pastors of the Church, contribute, with new impetus and ardor, to the radical and joyful rediscovery of the gift of baptism and to offer your original contribution to the cause of the New Evangelization.".

== Liturgy ==
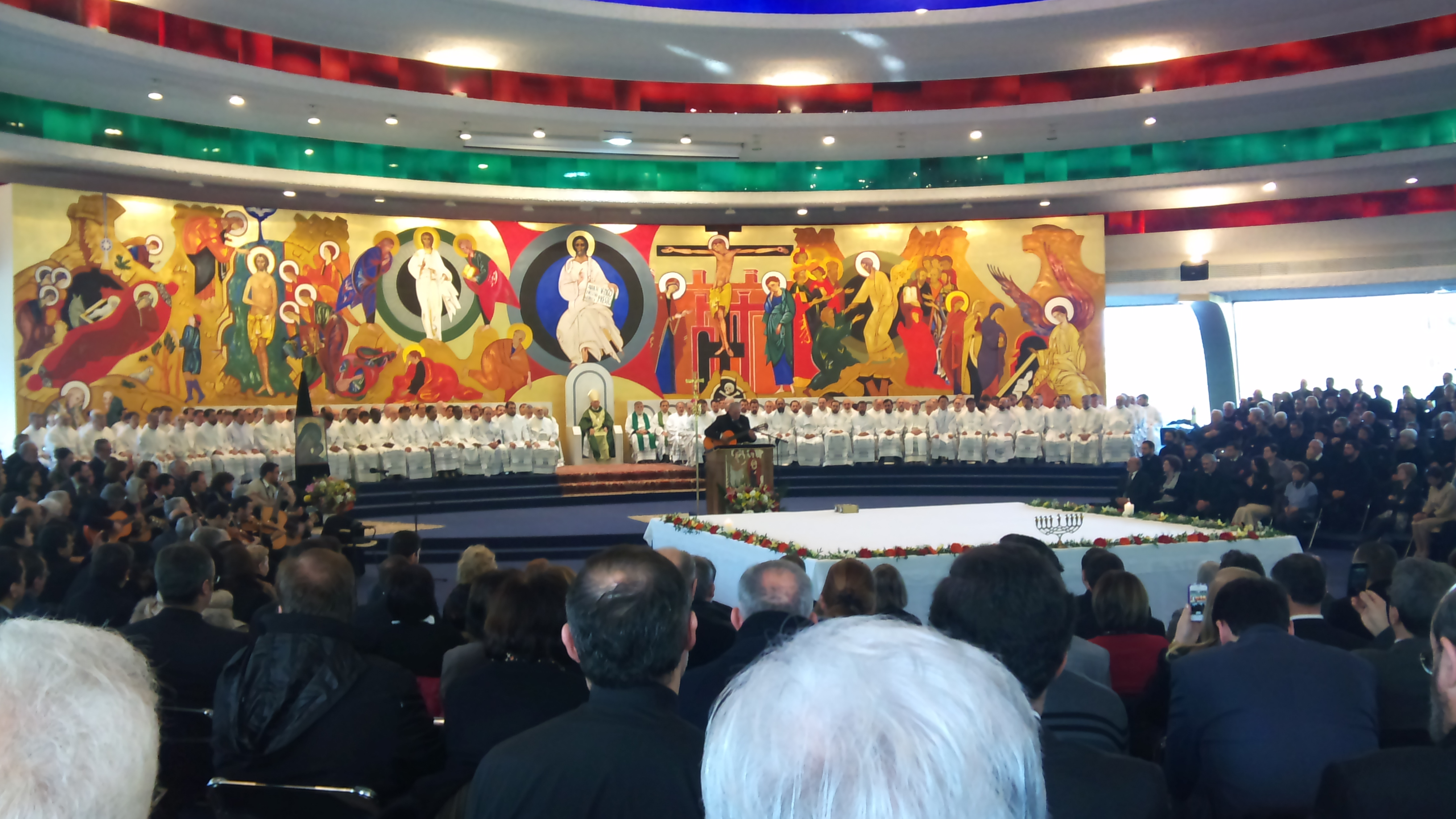
A Neocatechumenal Eucharist in Porto San Giorgio, Italy.

The Neocatechumenal Way regards liturgy as one of its three fundamental elements (tripod), along with the Word of God (scripture), and Christian community. The Paschal Mystery, celebrated in the Sacred Triduum, is seen as a liturgical axis and source of Christian life and a fulcrum of the Neocatechumenate which leads to "rediscovery" of Christian initiation. The Eucharist is essential to the Neocatechumenate, since this is a post-baptismal catechumenate lived in small communities. In fact, the Eucharist completes Christian initiation.

The Congregation for Divine Worship and the Discipline of the Sacraments has observed the Way's liturgical practices from the beginning. Pope John Paul II celebrated the Eucharist at the meeting with the communities in Porto San Giorgio in 1989, exactly as the communities do it, including the Communion rite in a sitting position.

Cardinal Francis Arinze, the Prefect of the Congregation from 2002 until 2008, wrote in December 2005 a private letter to Arguello, Hernández and Pezzi on behalf of Pope Benedict. One of the points of Arinze's letter has been contradicted by the Final Statutes of the Neocatechumenal Way, in which the celebrations of the Eucharist of the Neocatechumenal communities on Saturday evening have been recognized as "a part of the Sunday liturgical pastoral work of the parish open also to other faithful.”

In an interview with the Spanish newspaper La Razón, Antonio Cardinal Cañizares, then Prefect of the Congregation for Divine Worship, expressed his view on the Eucharistic celebration of the Neocatechumenal Way:

"There are no liturgical anomalies [in the Eucharist]; everything is in full compliance with the guidelines of the ‘Ordo Missae.’ What I have really seen there are Eucharists celebrated without any hurry, with a great faith, and where you can perceive the joy and the thanksgiving for the gift which is being bestowed in the Eucharist.”

The Statutes also mention the sacrament of Penance celebrated according to the rite of reconciliation for multiple penitents, with individual confession and absolution.

In April 2012, journalist Sandro Magister reported that Pope Benedict XVI asked the Congregation for the Doctrine of the Faith to review whether Masses celebrated by the Neocatechumenate are “in keeping with the liturgical teaching and practice of the Catholic church”.

== Criticism and opposition ==
The Neocatechumenal Way has encountered resistance and criticism from both liberal and traditionalist opponents. These including writers and journalists such as Gordon Urquhart who, known for his cooperation with Catholics for a Free Choice Foundation, in 1995, accused the Way and other lay movements, like Focolare and Communion and Liberation, of conservatism, fanaticism, sectarianism, devaluing of reason, "brainwashing", and a "personality cult" of the founders. In his publication he wrote that after the Neocatechumenate was introduced into the parish of St Germain-des-Prés in Paris, the Archbishop of Paris, François Cardinal Marty, blocked any further expansion before his retirement in 1981, and similar controversy in 1992 prompted the Bishop of Nancy to transfer the neocatechumens to a different church. Daniel Lifschitz, a convert from Judaism and former Way catechist, criticizes an excess of centrality of the Way on the initiators' charism and aesthetics, although not totally rejecting the validity of the movement.

In 1985, then-Cardinal Joseph Ratzinger, in the Rapporto Sulla Fede, spoke of new lay movements, including the Way. The future Pope remarked that they also entail greater or lesser dangers, but that it "happens with all living beings," while enumerating the fruits born in these charisms: enabling youth to live their faith fully, a great missionary élan, serious life of prayer, full and undivided catholicity, and numerous vocations to priesthood and consecrated life.

There have been allegations that the Way has a divisive impact on parishes. In 1996, Mervyn Alexander, Bishop of Clifton, in England, established a panel of inquiry to explore claims made by parishioners in three parishes (St Nicholas of Tolentino in Bristol, St Peter in Gloucester and Sacred Heart at Charlton Kings in Cheltenham) that had been harmed and experienced ‘considerable stress’ as well as ‘spiritual, personal and mental anguish’ by activities of the Neocatechumenal Way. The report stated that "it understands, from this presentation paper and the submitted evidence, that the Neocatechumenal Way over a long time (20 years) seeks to lead people towards salvation," but it is a cause of 'considerable stress', and 'spiritual, personal and mental anguish' for some individual members. The report recognized at the same time that "there is undoubtedly a 'conversion experience,'" and that it is drawing people in different conditions towards God.

In September 2019, Fr Ariel S. Levi di Gualdo, an Italian priest, dogmatic theologian and editor of the online journal Le edizioni di Patmos' ', published a book entitled La setta neocatecumenale' '(The Neo-Catechumenal Sect) , in which he documents that Pope John Paul II , ‘“begged by all the dicasteries of the Roman Curia and by the cardinal advisers not to give any approval, and above all not to allow them to open seminaries in order to create a deformed clergy for their own use and benefit”’.

In some places such as China and the Middle East, local Catholics have complained that missionaries of the Way have forced European songs, rituals and prayers on them, without inculturation. Archbishop Peter Takeo Okada, president of the Japanese Bishops' Conference, described the Way's presence in Japan’s small Catholic community as "a serious problem" and "divisive and confrontational". Staff and students of the Takamatsu Redemptoris Mater seminary relocated to Rome in 2009, and in 2010 the Japanese episcopal conference asked the Way to suspend its activities in Japan for five years. Local Catholic bishops suspended the Way's activities in the northern part of the Philippines in 2010, and in Nepal in 2011.

== Papal statements ==
Pope Paul VI stated in 1974: "What great joy and what great hope your presence and activity give us! ... Living and promoting this reawakening is what you call a form of 'follow-up to Baptism', which will renew in today's Christian communities those effects of maturity and deepening which in the early Church were achieved by the period of preparation for Baptism."

John Paul II, in 1980, regarding the nature of the Way, said that, "being a way, it is also movement". In his letter Ogni Qualvolta (1990), he "recognize[d] the Neocatechumenal Way as an effective means of Catholic formation for society and for the present time."

In February 2014, Pope Francis told the members of the Neocatechumenal Way that "[t]he Church is grateful for your generosity! I thank you for all that you do in the Church and in the world." Francis added that "[t]he freedom of the individual must not be forced, and you must respect even the eventual choice of those who should decide to look outside of the Way, for other forms of Christian life".

On March 6, 2015, Pope Francis again addressed the Neocatechumenal Way in Vatican City: "I confirm your call, I support your mission and I bless your charism. I do not do so because he [pointing at Kiko] paid me, no! I do so because I want to do it. You will go in Christ's name to the whole world to bring his Gospel: Christ precedes you, Christ accompanies you, Christ will bring to fulfilment the salvation of which you are bearers!"

On January 19, 2026, Pope Leo XIV addressed the Neocatechumenal Way in Vatican City: "The good you do is great, but its purpose is to enable people to know Christ, always respecting each person's life path and conscience. As guardians of this unity in the Spirit, I urge you to live your spirituality without ever separating yourselves from the rest of the ecclesial body... The proclamation of the Gospel, catechesis, and the various forms of pastoral activity must always be free from constraint, rigidity, and moralism, lest they arouse feelings of guilt and fear rather than inner liberation."

== Dialogue with Judaism ==
Since its beginnings it has been a matter of concern of the Neocatechumenal Way to emphasize the Jewish roots of the Christian faith. With reference to the Second Vatican Council and its emphasis on the Paschal mystery of Christ, for example, the Salvation history connection between the Jewish Passover and the Eucharistic celebration takes a broad space in the proclamation.

During his visit to Israel in 2000, Pope John Paul II consecrated the international centre of the Neocatechumenal Way Domus Galilaeae at the Sea of Galilee, which serves as a site of Christian-Jewish dialogue. In 2015 and 2017, meetings were held between high-ranking representatives of the Catholic Church and Judaism, where Jewish rabbis David Rosen from the American Jewish Committee and Ronald Lauder from the World Jewish Congress participated.

One of the important components of the dialogue with Judaism on the part of the Neocathechumenal Way is also Kiko Argüello's symphony The Suffering of the Innocent, a symphony in memory of the victims of the Holocaust, which was to be heard, among other places, in Jerusalem, New York City, the Vatican City and Auschwitz. In his appreciation of the symphony, which was also held on 10. June 2018 in the Berliner Philharmonie, the Potsdam rabbi Walter Homolka, chairman of the Union of Progressive Jews in Germany, recognised the special commitment of the Neocatechumenal Way in dialogue with Judaism and its recognition of the Jews as “Father in Faith”. Rabbi Jehoshua Ahrens said in a greeting that the Neocatechumenal Way led a dialogue at eye level with Jews.

== See also ==
- Light-Life Movement
