= Ratzinger =

Ratzinger is a German surname most common in Bavaria. It may mean a person from Ratzing, for there exist several such places in said state, or a patronymic of the forenames 'Razo' or 'Ratzo'.

Notable individuals who bear this surname include:

- Georg Ratzinger (1924-2020), German Catholic priest, musician and conductor; brother of Pope Benedict XVI
- Georg Ratzinger (politician) (1844-1899), German Catholic priest, author and politician; great-uncle of Georg Ratzinger and Pope Benedict XVI
- Joseph Ratzinger (1927-2022), German prelate, writer, philosopher and theologian; elected Pope Benedict XVI (2005-2013)
- Rudolf 'Rudy' Ratzinger (born 1966), German disc jockey and music producer; founder of Wumpscut

== See also ==
- Ratzinger Foundation
- Ratzinger Report
- 8661 Ratzinger, a main-belt asteroid
