= Pray to God =

Praying to God is the act of performing a prayer to God in a monotheist or henotheist context.

The phrase "Pray to God" may also refer to:

- "Pray to God" (song), a song by Calvin Harris featuring Haim
- Prie-dieu (literally "pray to God"), a desk for private devotional use

== See also ==
- Prayer to God, a 2000 song by Shellac from the album 1000 Hurts
- Prayer of God, the angel "צלתיאל", or Selaphiel
- Lord's Prayer (disambiguation)
