= Sermon on the Mount (disambiguation) =

The Sermon on the Mount is a sermon by Jesus of Nazareth, found in the Gospel of Matthew, that summarizes his basic teachings.

Sermon on the Mount may also refer to:

- Our Lord's Sermon on the Mount, a 393 book by Augustine of Hippo
- The Sermon on the Mount (book), a 1934 book by Emmet Fox
- "Sermon on the 'Mount" (South Park), a 2025 episode of the American animated comedy television series South Park

== See also ==
- Sermon on the Plain, another rendition of Jesus's sermon, found in the Gospel of Luke
- Sermon on the Mound, name given to a 1988 speech by Margaret Thatcher
- Beatitudes (disambiguation)
- Lord's Prayer (disambiguation)
