= Families in mission =

Catholic missionary families

The Families in Mission are Catholic families coming from the Neocatechumenal Way, who volunteer to go in mission, usually to wherever is requested by the bishops of the Catholic Church, with the goal of carrying out evangelization, implantation of the church (implantatio ecclesiae) and/or the foundation of the Neocatechumenal Way.

Their sending usually takes place in the presence of the local Bishop in an official ceremony. In most cases their assignments and mission have been ratified by the Holy Fathers, since Pope John Paul II.

The families in Mission come under the authority of the Ordinary of a Diocese in collaboration with the National Team responsible for the Neocatechumenal Way in that country. They are usually supported by diocesan missionary priests formed in the Redmptoris Mater Seminaries and Houses of Formation throughout the world. The families usually aim to be self sufficient, such as taking up paid work. Additionally, the children of these families usually attend the local Catholic schools. The families aim to become fully integrated into the Parish life and the culture of the city where they move to. Although the aim of the mission is to stay in their assignment for most of their life, they are not bound by religious vows and so remain free to end their mission if needed or to move to other territories if called to do so.

While the majority of families are sent to disadvantaged areas, in 2018 the Associated Press ran an article on a family from Spain serving in the United States. They were however serving in south Philadelphia which is not the most advantaged area of the city.

On 30 December 1988, during a celebration of the Holy Mass with the Neocatechumenal Way, Pope John Paul II sent 72 families on mission, which is considered to be the start of the Families in Mission project, saying:

The family is on mission. This mission is fundamental to all nations, to all mankind: it is the mission of love and life, the witness of love and life. Holy Church of God, you cannot fulfill your mission, you cannot accomplish your task in the world if not by the family and its mission! Family in mission, Trinity in mission!

Since then many other families have been sent on mission. For example:

- Pope Benedict XVI sent out two hundred families in mission on 12 January 2006
- Pope Francis sent out 250 missionary families on 16 March 2016

There are currently thousands of families in mission around the world, in all six inhabited continents.

== See also ==
- Neocatechumenal Way
- Roman Catholic Church
