= Mario Pezzi (priest) =

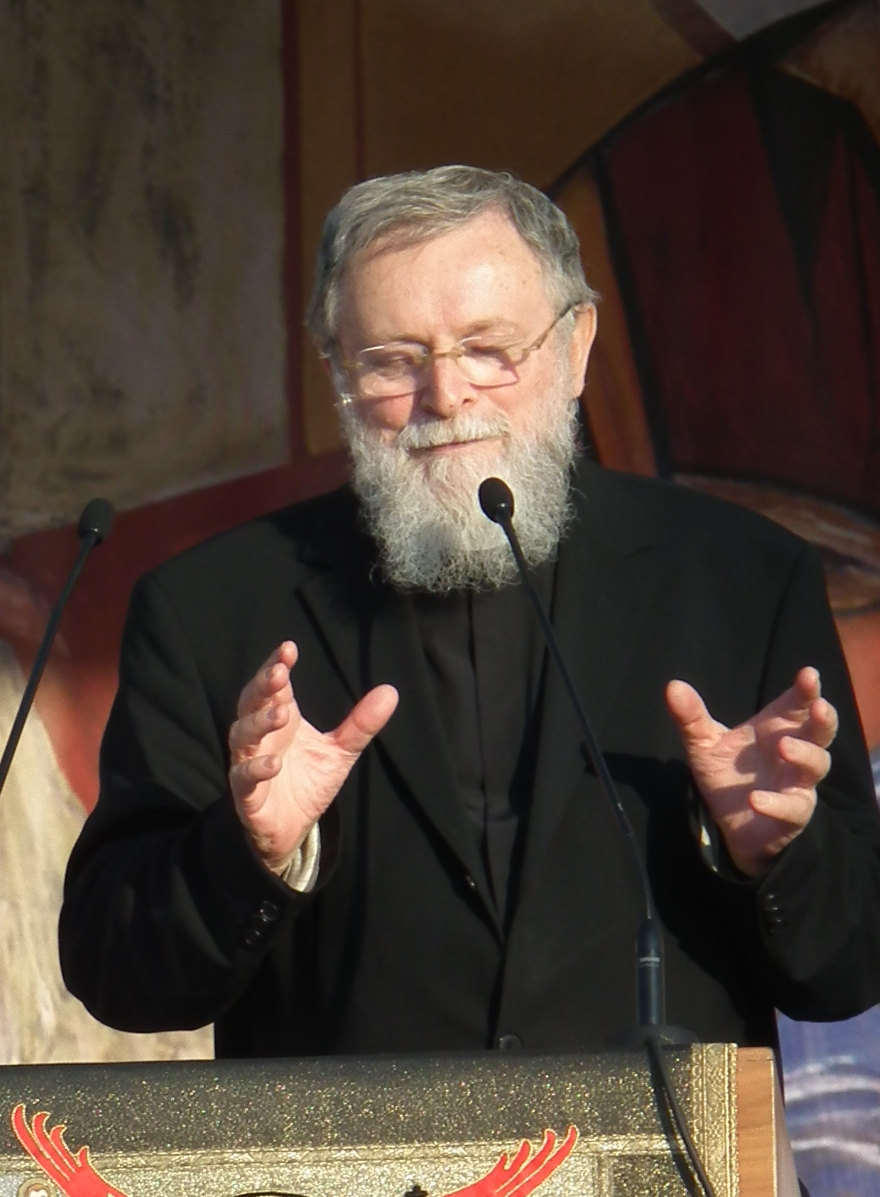
Mario Pezzi

Mario Pezzi (born Gottolengo, 19 September 1941) is an Italian Catholic priest, theologian and catechist. He is one of leading names of the Neocatechumenal Way, with Kiko Argüello and Carmen Hernández.

== Biography ==
He entered the Comboni Missionaries of the Heart of Jesus seminary in 1951, aged 10 years old. He was ordained a priest on 18 March 1969. He joined the Neocatechumenal Way in 1970, becoming a priest of their International Responsible Team the following year. He first met Pope John Paul II in 1979, together with the two founders of the Neocatechumenal Way.

His work is to present a theological-pastoral view inside the NCW, where he is the leading priest. Every year he carries out the work of collating texts from the Magisterium and Tradition of the Church to help the catechists and members of the NCW. His work is presented each year at the beginning of the catechesis of the NCW courses.

== See also ==
- Neocatechumenal Way
