= Lord's Prayer (disambiguation) =

The Lord's Prayer is a central prayer in Christianity.

Lord's Prayer may also refer to:

== Albums ==
- The Lord's Prayer (Mormon Tabernacle Choir album), 1959
- The Lord's Prayer, by Reba Rambo and Dony McGuire, 1980

== Songs ==
- "The Lord's Prayer" (Albert Hay Malotte song), 1935
- "The Lord's Prayer" (David Fanshawe song), 1988
- "The Lord's Prayer" (Sister Janet Mead song), 1973
- "The Lord's Prayer", by Roy Harper from Lifemask, 1982
- "The Lord's Prayer", by Siouxsie and the Banshees, 1976

== See also ==
- Pray to God (disambiguation)
- Sermon on the Mount (disambiguation)
