= Redemptoris Mater (seminary) =

Diocesan Roman Catholic seminaries since 1988

The seal of Redemptoris Mater seminaries

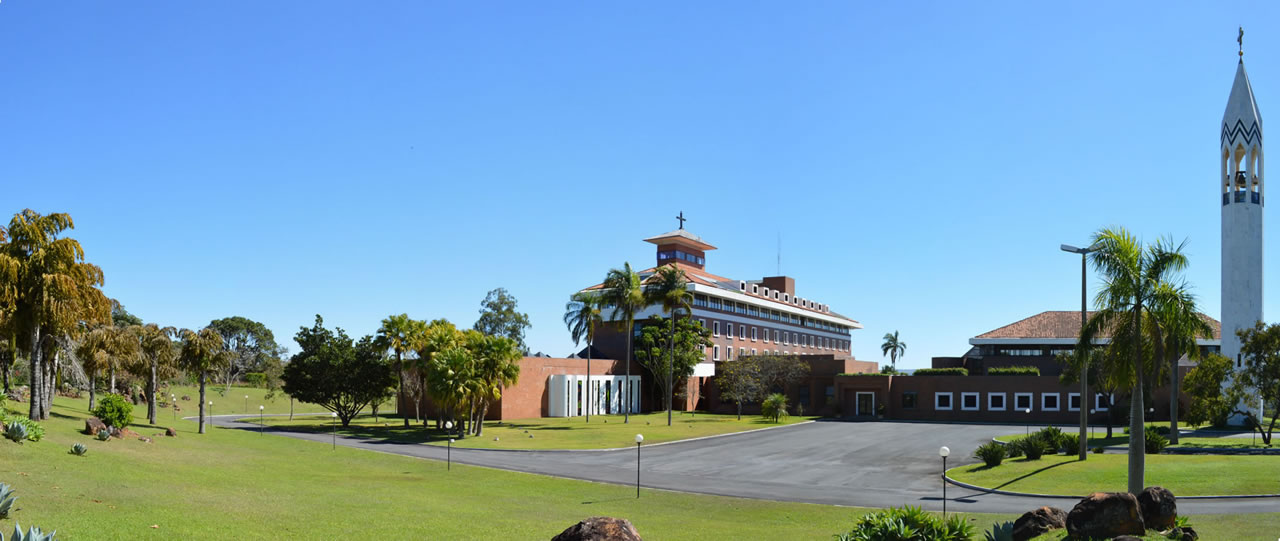
Brasília's Redemptoris Mater Seminary

Redemptoris Mater (Latin: Mother of the Redeemer) is the name for certain diocesan Roman Catholic seminaries which operate under the auspices of the Neocatechumenal Way and have as their mission the formation of diocesan priests for the "New Evangelization". These seminaries are distributed worldwide.

== History and development ==
Redemptoris Mater seminaries are a fruit of the Second Vatican Council, as well as a product of the initiative of Pope John Paul II. The Second Vatican Council's decree on the ministry and life of priests, Presbyterorum ordinis, says:

Let priests remember, therefore, that the care of all churches must be their intimate concern. Hence, priests of such dioceses rich in vocations should show themselves willing and ready, with the permission of their own ordinaries, to volunteer for work in other regions, missions or endeavors which are poor in numbers of clergy. ... To accomplish this purpose there should be set up international seminaries ... by means of which, according to their particular statutes and always saving the right of bishops, priests may be trained and incardinated for the good of the whole Church.

Pio Laghi, then Prefect of the Congregation for Catholic Education, said:

The decree Presbyterorum Ordinis (n. 10) considers that to resolve the problem of the great shortage of priests in certain regions, "it is appropriate also to institute international seminaries". This idea has found application in the Redemptoris Mater seminaries which prepare diocesan priests for the new evangelization according to the programme of the Neo-Catechumenal Way.

The first of these seminaries was started in Rome in 1988. It was canonically erected by Ugo Poletti, who was at that time the Vicar General of Rome.

== Characteristics ==
Redemptoris Mater seminaries are diocesan seminaries, erected according to canon law by the diocesan bishop, and the students who undergo formation at these seminaries are ordained to the secular clergy of the diocese. The specific characteristics of Redemptoris Mater seminaries are:

- an international character, i.e., with vocations coming from different nations;
- a missionary spirit, i.e., that upon ordination, the priests are available to go wherever the ordinary sends them; and
- that they have a connection to the Neocatechumenal Way.

Although the students receive the same theological formation as the other seminarians of the diocese, they go on mission for about two years during formation. After ordination, the ordinary of their diocese may appoint them to a parish or for any other service in the diocese; he may also send them to serve in other dioceses of the world where bishops have asked for help. In the latter case, the ordinary and the requesting bishop would formalise their agreement according to canon law.

These seminaries have a direct relationship to the Neocatechumenal Way, which sees its formation as fostering an "adult faith": the Neocatechumenal Way prepares and awakens its vocations in many young people before they enter the seminary. It accompanies them during their time of formation; once ordained as priests it continues to sustain them in their permanent formation, which then becomes a means of evangelization for the "far away", an instrument for the implantatio ecclesiae.

== Worldwide locations ==
In 2013, with seven new seminaries opened, the number Redemptoris Mater seminaries worldwide rose to a hundred. In 2019, the number of seminaries rose to about 120.

In Africa:

- Ivory Coast (Yopougon)
- Angola (Luanda)
- Cameroon (Douala)
- Zambia (Kitwe)
- Democratic Republic of Congo (Goma)
- Madagascar (Morondava)
- Gabon (Libreville)
- Tanzania (Dar es Salaam)
- South Africa (Cape Town)
- Uganda (Kampala)

In Asia:

- India (Bangalore, Ranchi, Pune)
- Israel (at Domus Galilaeae)
- Taiwan (Kaohsiung)
- Philippines (Manila)
- Lebanon (Beirut)
- Pakistan (Karachi)
- South Korea (Seoul)

In Australia:

- Australia (Perth, Sydney),

In Europe:

- Italy (Rome, Macerata, Ascoli Piceno, Cosenza, Pinerolo Florence, Trieste, Campobasso, Bologna)
- Belgium (Namur, Brussels)
- Spain (Madrid, Castellón, Córdoba, Granada, Oviedo, Murcia, León, Pamplona, Burgos)
- Poland (Warsaw, Łódź)
- Germany (Berlin, Cologne/Bonn)
- Hungary (Eger)
- Slovakia (Žilina)
- Czech Republic (České Budějovice)
- Romania (Satu Mare)
- Bosnia and Herzegovina (Sarajevo)
- Croatia (Pula)
- Switzerland (Lugano)
- France (Strasbourg, Marseille, Avignon, Paris, Bayonne)
- Denmark (Copenhagen,)
- Netherlands (Amsterdam/Haarlem, Roermond)
- Austria (Vienna)
- Albania (Lezhë)
- Portugal (Lisbon, Porto, Évora, Beja)
- United Kingdom (London)
- Ireland (Dundalk, Armagh Diocese)
- Finland (Helsinki)
- Estonia (Tallinn)
- Ukraine (Kyiv, Vinnytsia, Uzhhorod)
- Latvia (Rīga)

In North America:

- Canada (Toronto, Quebec City, Vancouver).
- Costa Rica (San José)
- Dominican Republic (Santo Domingo)
- El Salvador (San Salvador)
- Jamaica (Kingston)
- Mexico (Mexico City, Guadalajara, Puebla)
- Nicaragua (Managua)
- United States (Newark, Brooklyn, Denver, Washington, D.C., Boston, Dallas, Miami, Philadelphia, Bridgeport)

In South America:

- Bolivia (La Paz)
- Brazil (Brasília, Rio de Janeiro, São Paulo, Belém)
- Colombia (Medellín, Bogotá),
- Ecuador (Esmeraldas in Quito)
- Paraguay (Asunción)
- Peru (Callao, Arequipa)
- Venezuela (Caracas, Carupano)
- Uruguay (Montevideo)

== Football tournaments ==
In 2007, 2009 and again in 2010, Redemptoris Mater Sydney seminary team won first place in the Clericus Cup football tournament. In the year 2008 they won second place. At the end of July, 2018, Corpus Christi College of Melbourne won an inter-seminary soccer tournament for the first time after beating Holy Spirit Seminary of Brisbane 1 - 0 in the final.
