= Church of the Beatitudes =

Roman Catholic church in Israel

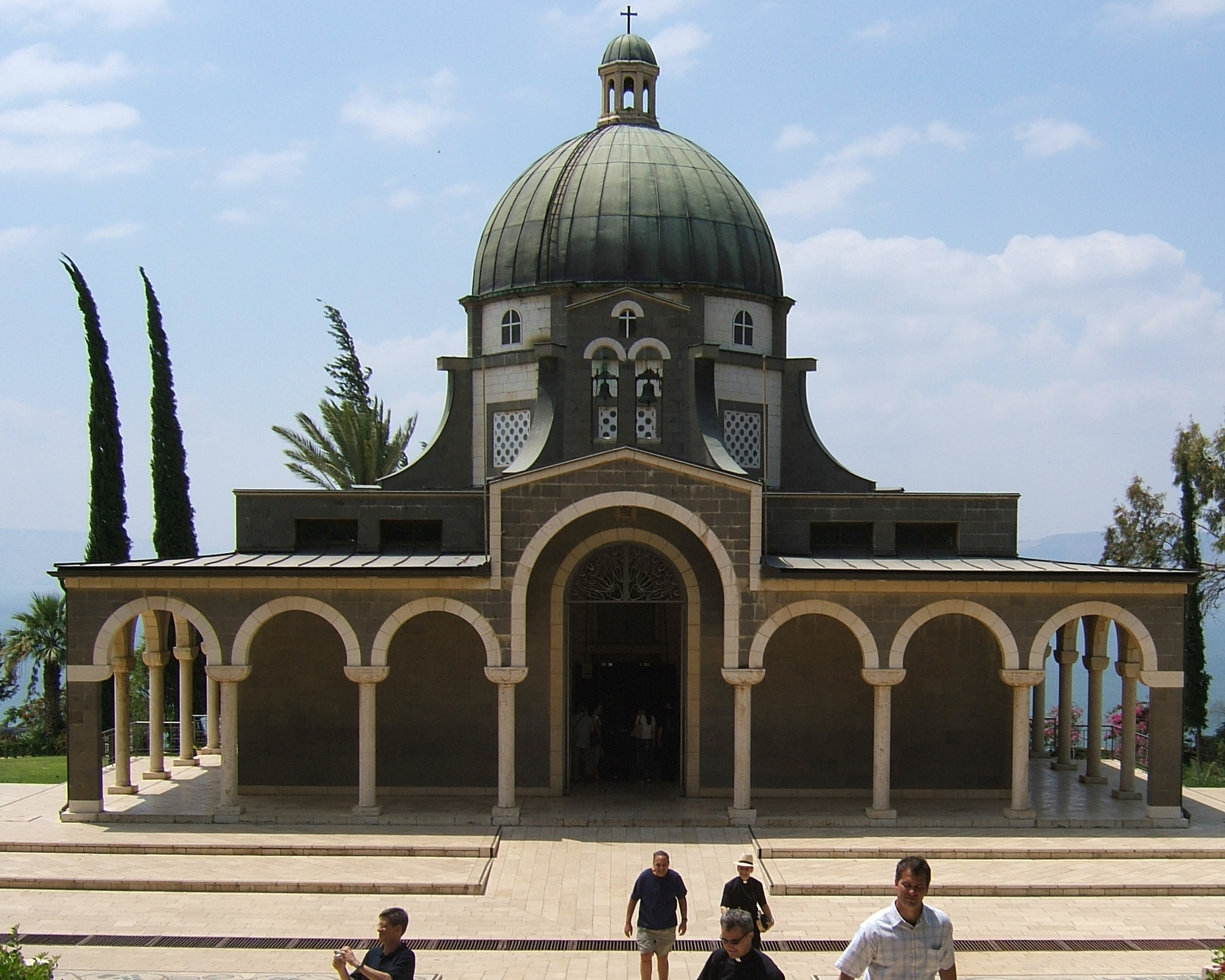
- Exterior view

Religion
- Affiliation: Roman Catholic
- Leadership: Associazione Nazionale per Soccorrere i Missionari Italiani (ANSMI)

Location
- Location: Tabgha, Israel
- Interactive map of Church of the Beatitudes
- Coordinates: 32.880858°N 35.555792°E

Architecture
- Architect: Antonio Barluzzi
- Style: Neo-Byzantine
- Completed: 1938

The Church of the Beatitudes (Hebrew: כנסיית הר האושר) is a Roman Catholic church located on the Mount of Beatitudes by the Sea of Galilee near Tabgha and Capernaum in Israel.

== History ==
The church is located on a small hill overlooking the Sea of Galilee, the traditional "mount" on which Jesus delivered the Sermon on the Mount. The current church sits uphill from the ruins of a small Byzantine-era church dating to the late 4th century, which contains a rock-cut cistern beneath it and the remains of a small monastery to its southeast. Part of the original mosaic floor has also been recovered and is now on display in Capernaum.

Christian pilgrims are known to have commemorated this approximate site since at least the 4th century. In her itinerary of the Holy Land, after describing the Church of the Loaves and Fishes, the pilgrim Egeria (c. 381 CE) writes, "Near there on a mountain is the cave to which the Savior climbed and spoke the Beatitudes." Both Popes Paul VI and John Paul II celebrated Mass at the church during their pastoral visits to the Holy Land.

== Design and construction ==
The modern church was built between 1936 and 1938 near the site of the fourth-century Byzantine ruins. The floor plan is octagonal, the eight sides representing the eight Beatitudes. The church is Neo-Byzantine in style with a marble veneer casing the lower interior walls and gold mosaic in the dome. Around the altar are mosaic symbols on the pavement representing Justice, Prudence, Fortitude, Temperance, Faith, Hope, and Charity.

Jerome Murphy-O'Connor describes the selection of the site thus: "It was perhaps inevitable that this well-watered area with its shade trees on the shore of the Sea of Galilee, where Byzantine pilgrims ate their picnics, should have been identified as the location of two episodes involving the consumption of food, the multiplication of the loaves and fishes and the conferral on Peter of the responsibility of leadership after a fish breakfast. Then it became convenient to localize the Sermon of the Mount on the small hill nearby." (The Holy Land: An Oxford Archaeological Guide from Earliest Times to 1700, p. 277) Regardless of whether this is the very spot, the Church of the Beatitudes stands in the general area and in a very similar setting to where Jesus would have stood as he delivered his famous sermon. As Murphy-O'Connor puts it, "from here one can see virtually all the places in which Jesus lived and worked" (p. 280).

== Architect ==
The church was designed by the architect Antonio Barluzzi, under commission from the Italian Mission Society with funding from Benito Mussolini.

== Religious affiliation ==
The Church of the Beatitudes is maintained and overseen by the National Association for Assistance to Italian Missionaries (Associazione Nazionale per Soccorrere i Missionari Italiani, ANSMI). The Franciscan Missionary Sisters of the Immaculate Heart of Mary (FMCIM), known as the Sisters of Egypt, take care of the church and offer hospitality.

== Churches with the same name ==
- A United Church of Christ church in Phoenix, Arizona, US
- An old Catholic church in Trainer, Pennsylvania, US
- An American Baptist church in St. Petersburg, Florida, US
- A Catholic church just southeast of Pretoria, South Africa

== Gallery ==
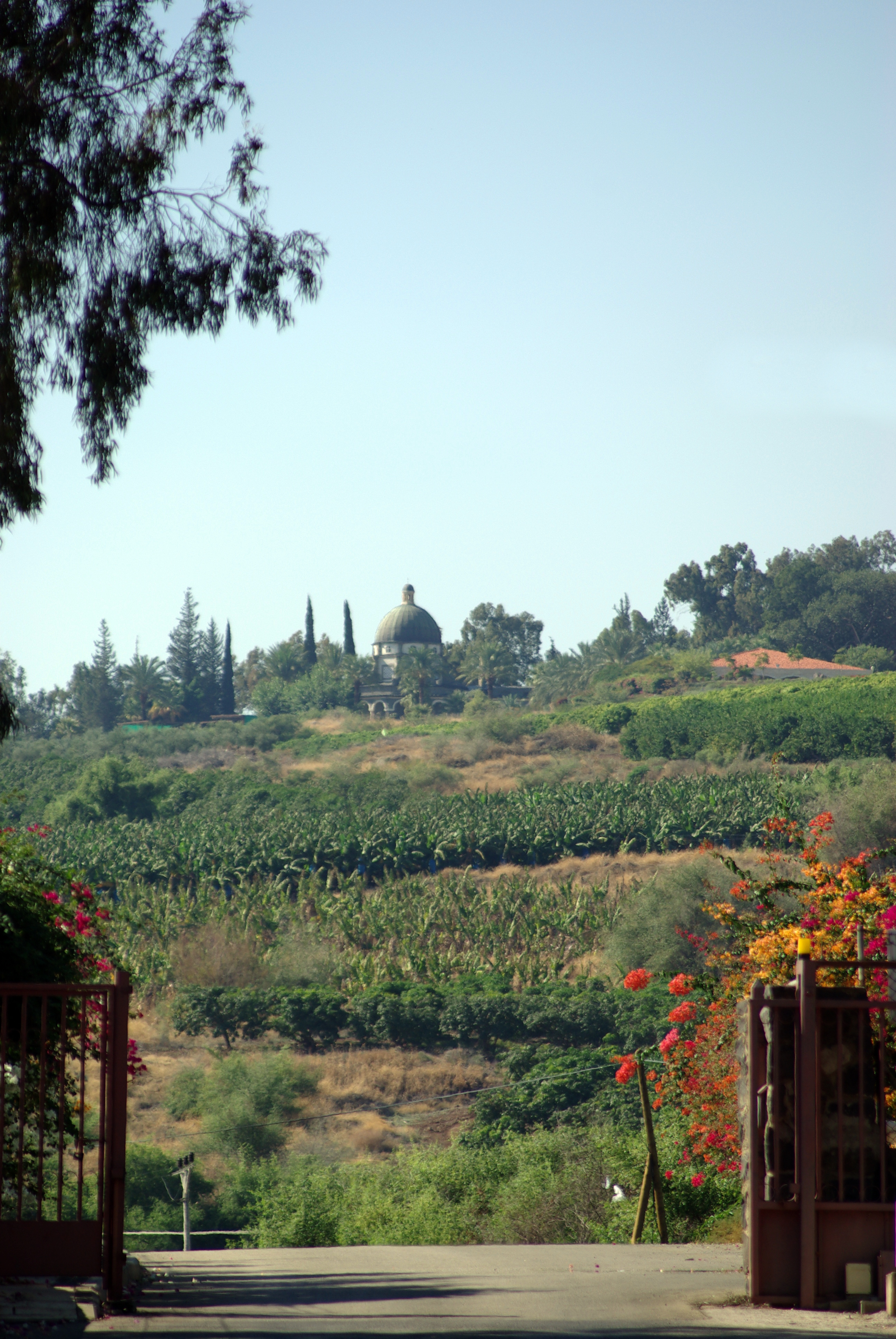
Seen from Capernaum

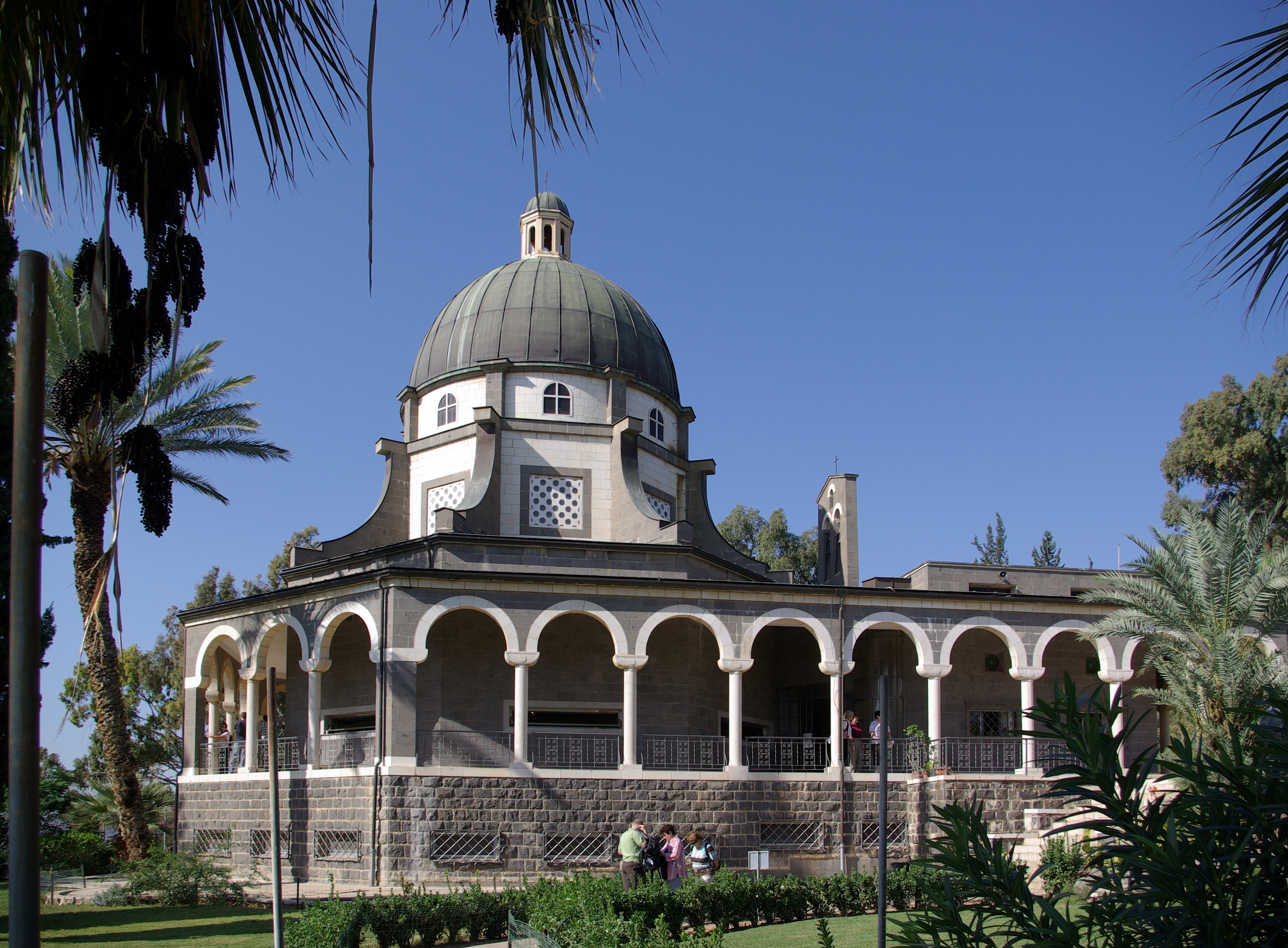
Side view

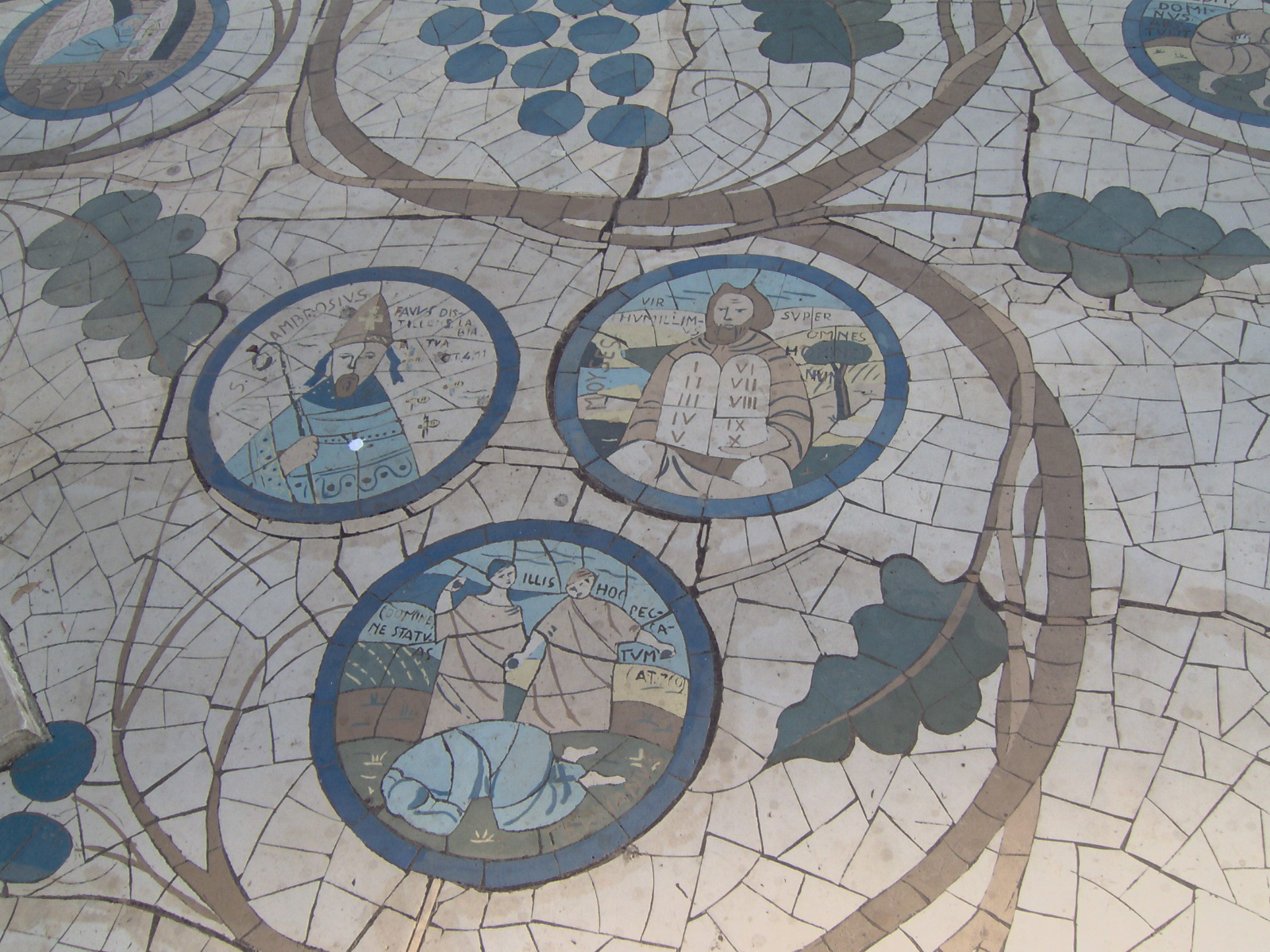
Pavement mosaic
