= Ólvega =

- Municipality
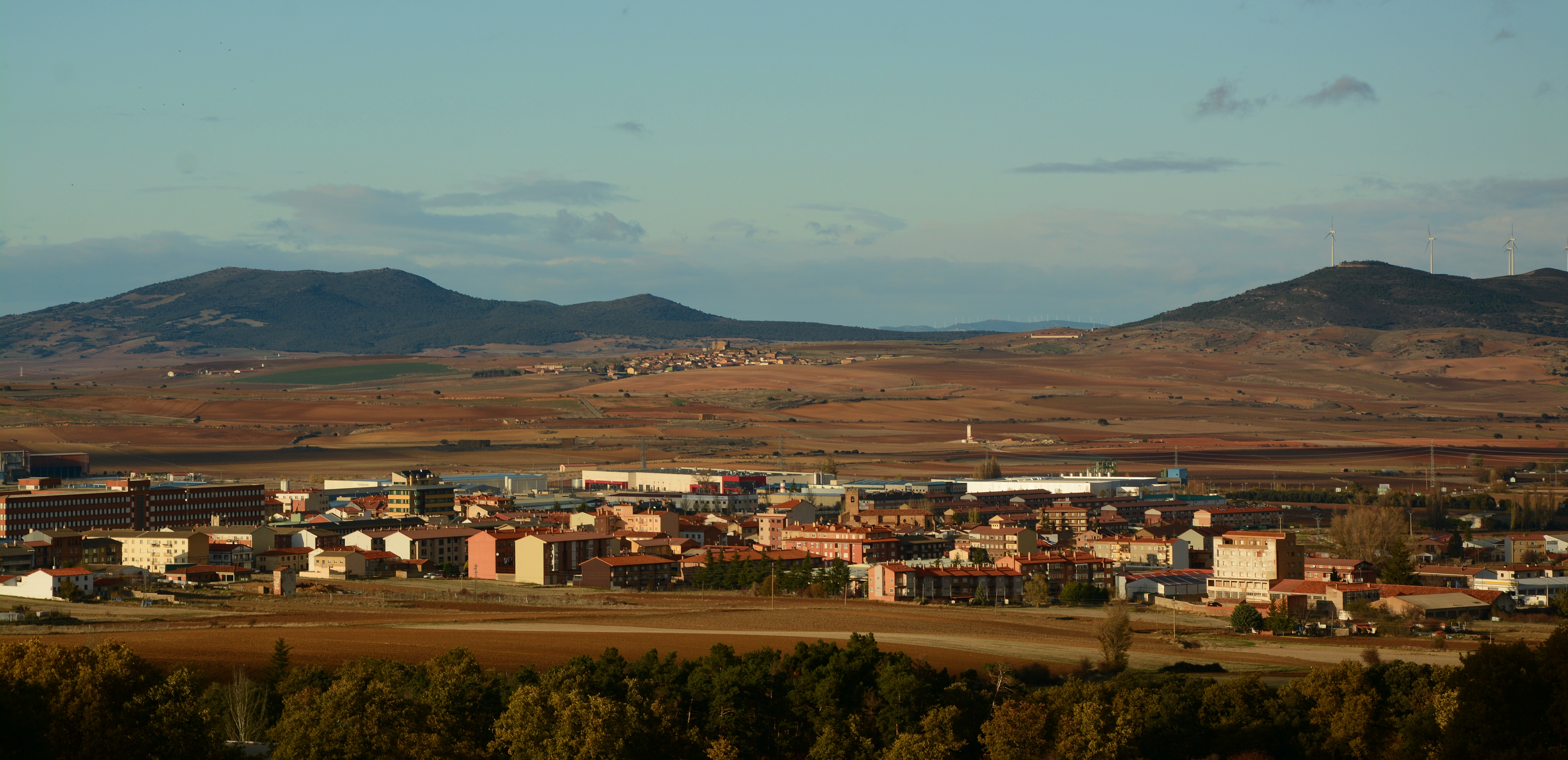

- Flag Coat of arms

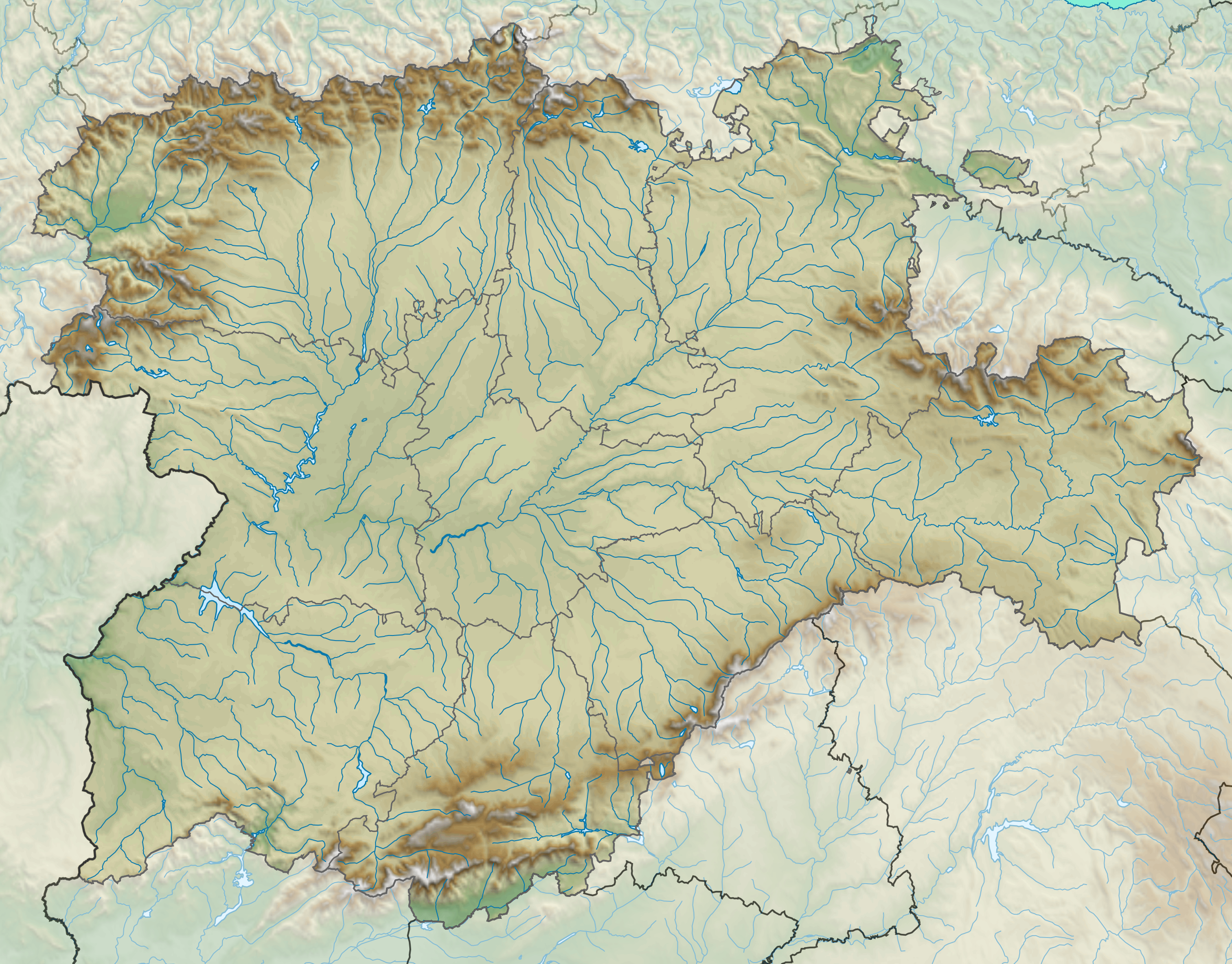
- Location within Spain Location within Castile and León
- Coordinates: 41°46′N 1°58′W
- Country: Spain
- Autonomous community: Castile and León
- Province: Soria

Government
  - Mayor: Gerardo Martínez (PP)

Area
  - Total: 98 km^{2} (38 sq mi)

Population (2025-01-01)
  - Total: 3,782
  - Density: 39/km^{2} (100/sq mi)
- Time zone: UTC+1 (CET)
  - Summer (DST): UTC+2 (CEST)
- Website: Official website

Ólvega is a municipality located in the province of Soria, Castile and León, Spain. As of 2009, the municipality had a population of 3,749 inhabitants.

== Villages ==
- Muro de Ólvega
