= The Ratzinger Report =

Collection of interviews by Joseph Ratzinger (Pope Benedict XVI)

- Book cover
- Author: Joseph Ratzinger
- Original title: Rapporto Sulla Fede
- Translator: Salvator Attanasio; Graham Harrison
- Language: English
- Subject: Catholic Church
- Publisher: Ignatius Press
- Publication date: 1985
- Pages: 197
- ISBN: 978-0-89870-080-0

The Ratzinger Report (Italian: Rapporto Sulla Fede) is a 1985 book consisting of a series of interviews collected over several days given by Cardinal Joseph Ratzinger to the Italian journalist Vittorio Messori. The book focuses on the state of the Catholic Church after the Second Vatican Council. The book is very critical of the "hermeneutic of rupture" associated with the liberal "spirit of Vatican II" within the Church. It has often been reread in the context of the papacy of Pope Benedict XVI in order to better understand the mind and the thinking of the former pontiff.

== Topics ==
- The true Spirit and letter of Vatican II
- The Church as God's Church, not the laity Church
- The nature of the priesthood
- The papacy, the episcopacy, and the role of bishops' conferences.
- Liberalism, relativism and the permissiveness of modern society
- The role of women
- Six reasons not to forget the Blessed Virgin Mary
- Spirituality for today
- The dignity of the liturgy, the eucharist as the heart of faith, and the difference between solemnity and triumphalism
- The devil, the angels, purgatory, and limbo
- Ecumenism and Christian unity
- Liberation theology, Marxism and capitalism
- Evangelization and why Jesus is the only Savior
