= Mount of Beatitudes =

Hill in northern Israel

Coordinates: 32°52′56.04″N 35°33′18.61″E

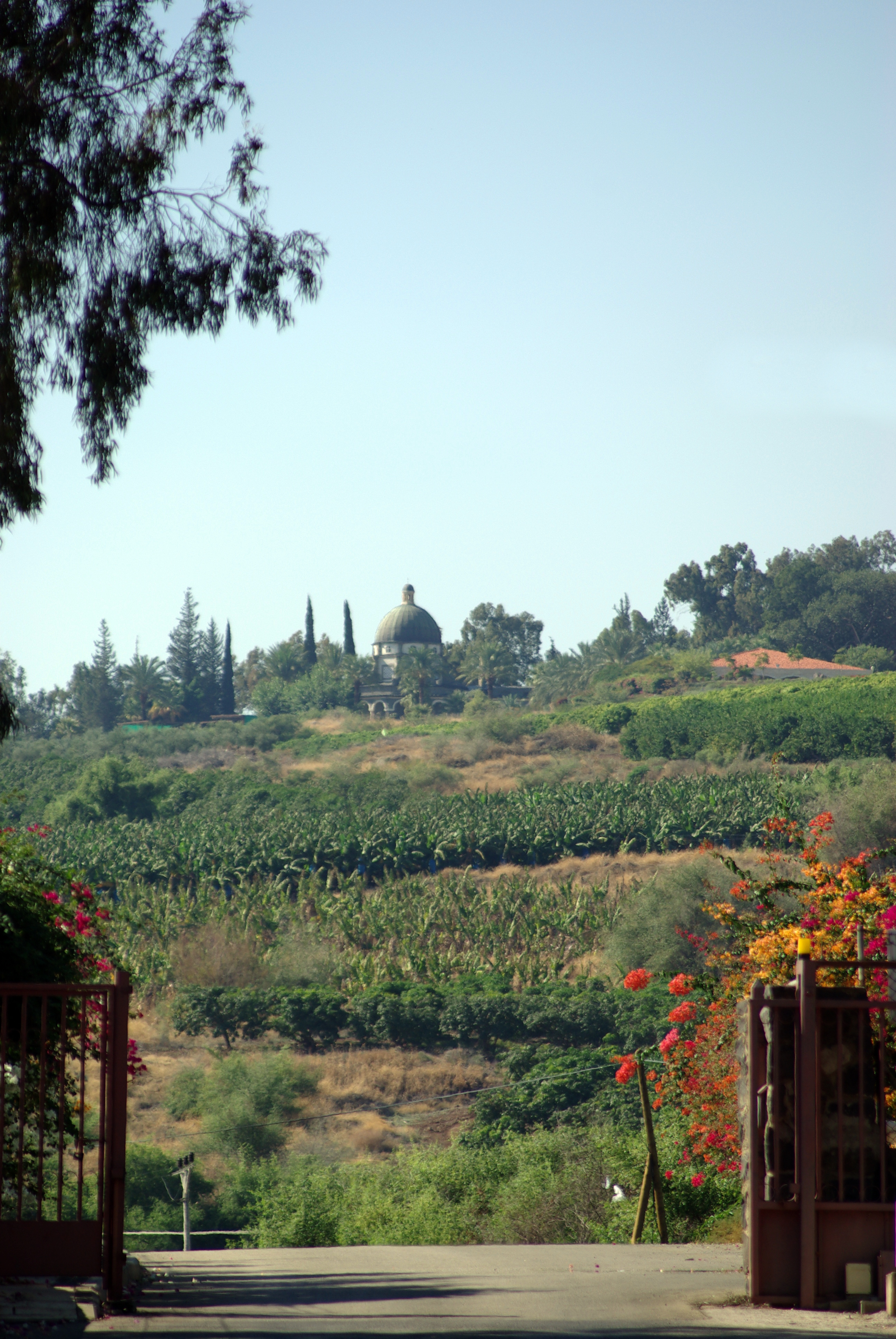
Mount of Beatitudes, seen from Capernaum

The Mount of Beatitudes (Hebrew: הר האושר, Har HaOsher) is a hill in northern Israel, in the Korazim Plateau. It is the traditional site of Jesus' Sermon on the Mount.

== Location ==
The site known as the Mount of Beatitudes is on the northwestern shore of the Sea of Galilee, between Capernaum and the archeological site of Tel Kinrot, covered by the ruins of ancient Kinneret (also known as Ginosar and Gennesaret), on the southern slopes of the Korazim Plateau. Its negative altitude (around 25 metres below sea level, nearly 200 metres above the Sea of Galilee) makes it one of the lowest summits of the world. This site, very near Tabgha and also known as Mount Eremos, has been commemorated for more than 1600 years. Other suggested locations for the Jesus' Sermon on the Mount have included the nearby Mount Arbel, or even the Horns of Hattin.

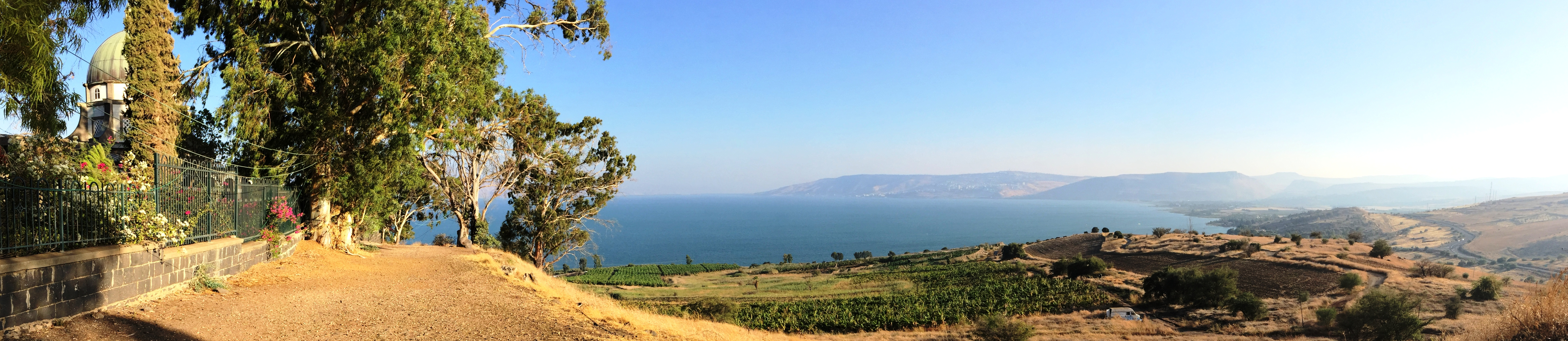
View of the Lake of Tibériade (Sea of Galilee) from the Mount of Beatitudes

== Churches ==
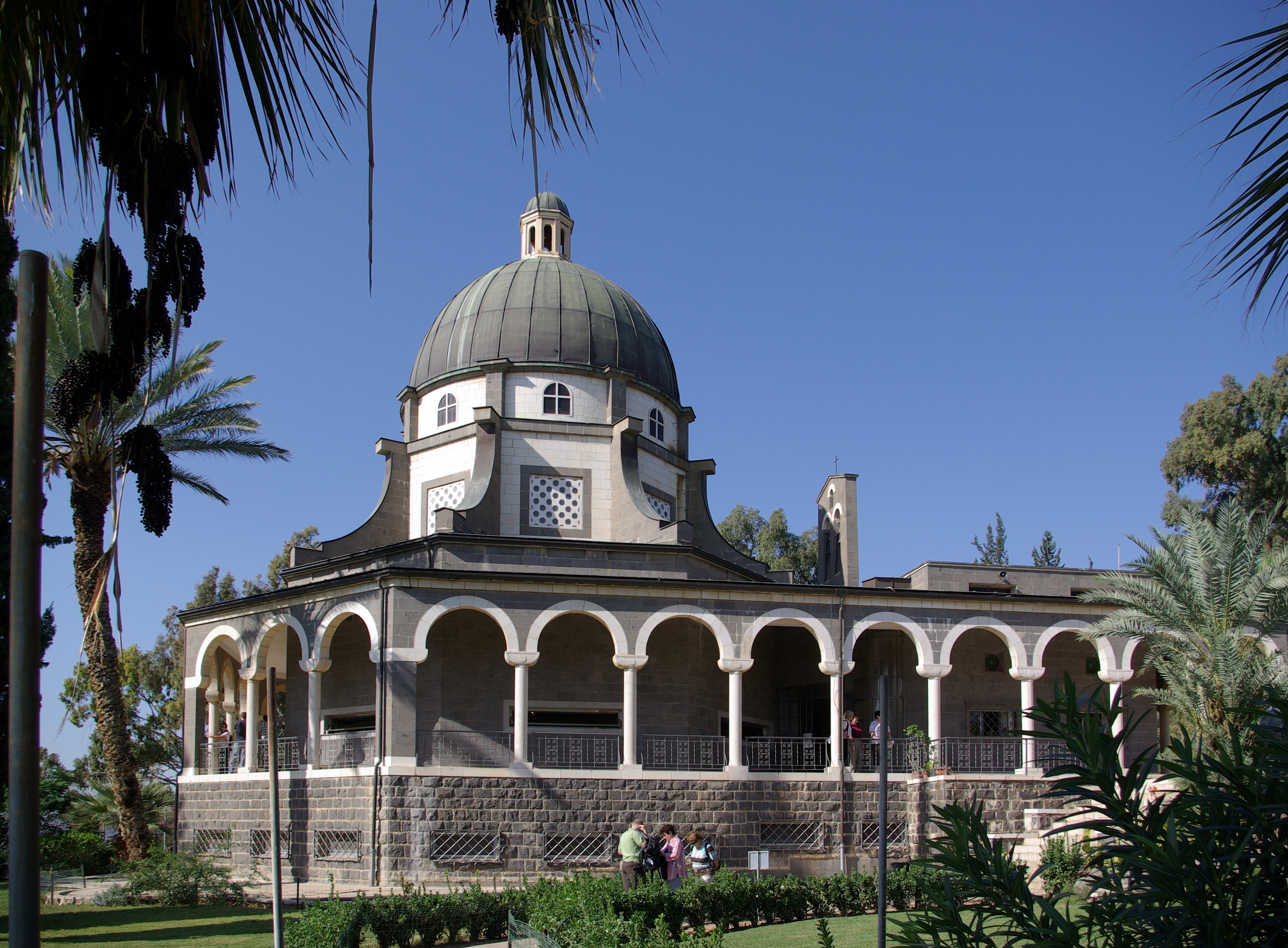
Roman Catholic chapel at Mount of Beatitudes

A Byzantine church was erected lower down the slope from the current site in the 4th century, and it was used until the 7th century. Remains of a cistern and a monastery are still visible. The current Roman Catholic Franciscan chapel was built in 1937-38 following plans by Italian architect Antonio Barluzzi.

Pope John Paul II celebrated a Mass at this site in March 2000. The Jesus Trail pilgrimage route connects the Mount to other sites traditionally associated with the life of Jesus.

== See also ==
- Christianity in Israel
- Church of the Beatitudes
- Domus Galilaeae
- Horns of Hattin
- Tourism in Israel
