= Domus Galilaeae =

Christian meeting place on the Mount of Beatitudes, north of Capernaum, Israel

Coordinates: 32°54′7.79″N 35°33′6.4″E

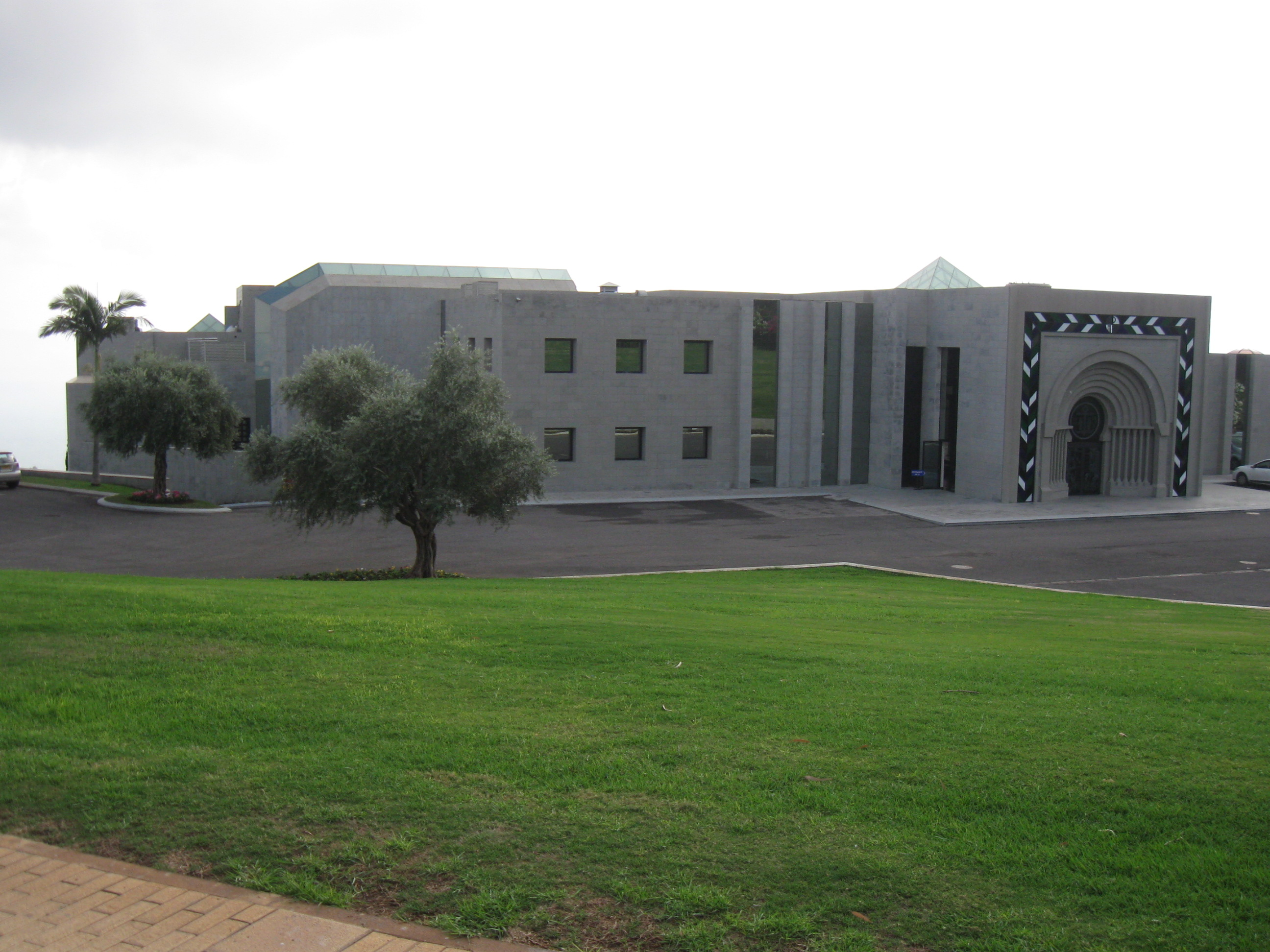
- Domus Galilaeae

Religion
- Affiliation: Roman Catholic
- Leadership: Neocatechumenal Way

Location
- Location: Mount of Beatitudes, Israel
- Interactive map of Domus Galilaeae

Architecture
- Style: Modern
- Completed: 2000

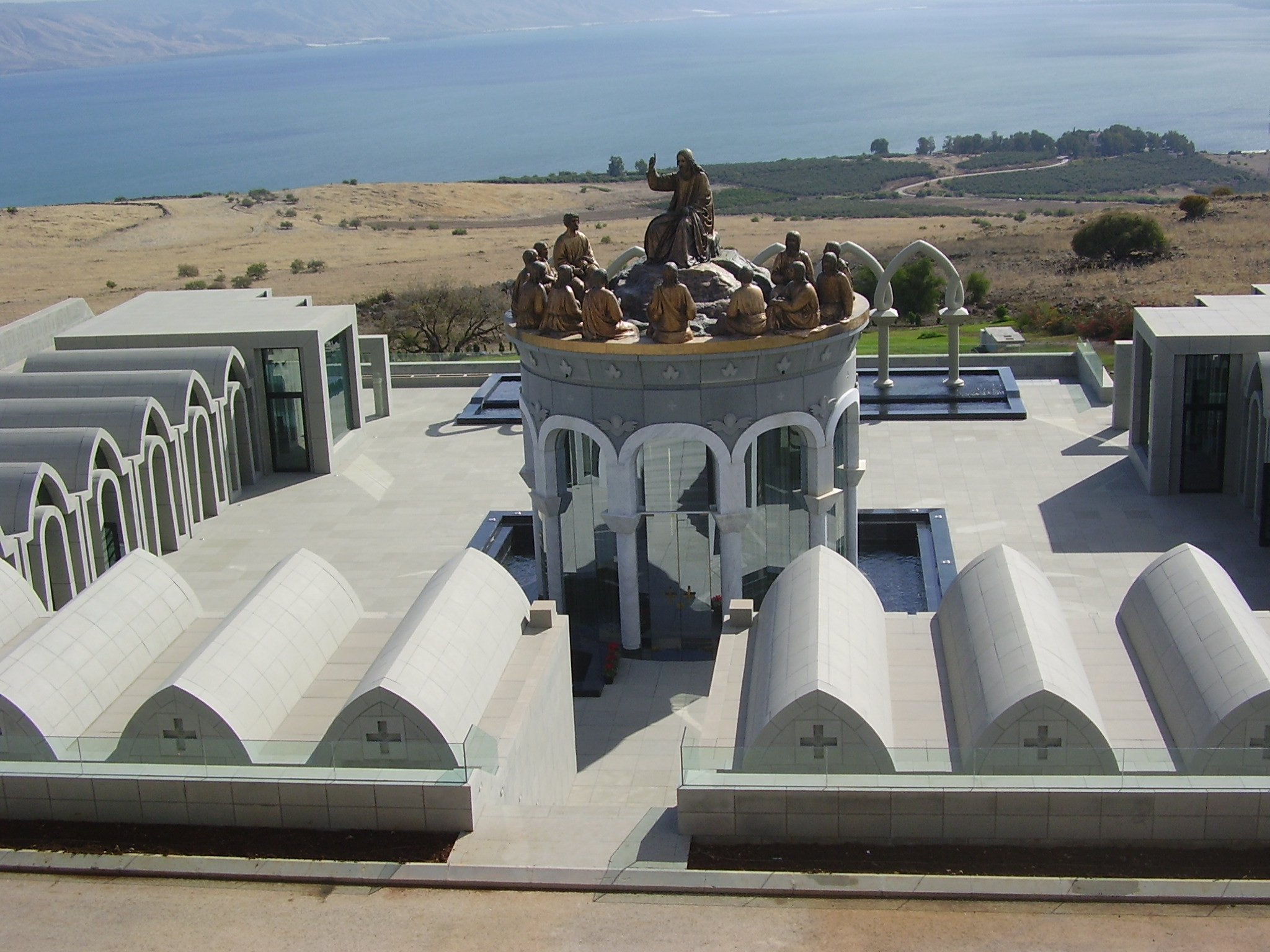
Jesus and the 12 apostles in Domus Galileae

Domus Galilaeae or House of Galilee (Hebrew: בית הגליל), located on the peak of Mount of Beatitudes, above and north of Capernaum and the Sea of Galilee, is a Christian meeting place used for seminars and conventions, run by the Neocatechumenal Way. On his pilgrimage to Israel in 2000, Pope John Paul II visited Domus Galilaeae and said he hoped it would become a place for interreligious dialogue.

== History ==
Domus Galilaeae employs about 150 people full-time, including labourers, technicians, and volunteers. There are 37 Arab Christian workers, 32 Arab Muslims, 21 Jewish technicians, 20 Druzes, and 10 Maronites.

The building was constructed in a short period of time, with the first stone being laid in January 1999 and the opening of the site taking place in 2000. It was inaugurated by the Pope John Paul II in his Millennium visit to the Holy Land. In the centre of the library is an ancient Torah. The architect used traditional Tuscan building stone, "pietra serena" limestone and "pietra forte colombino" sandstone, polished and processed with great attention to detail.

The centre is envisaged as a place where Christians will learn about the living tradition of Israel, following the footsteps of early Christian saints "who returned to their Hebrew roots to understand the meaning of prayer, of feasts, and Hebrew liturgies". John Paul II, who exemplified a new era of affinity between Catholics and Jews, emphasised the need to appreciate Jewish roots in order to live-out authentic Christianity; he explicitly endorsed the continuing life and vitality of the Jewish faith and prayed for Jewish continuance.

== See also ==
- Christianity in Israel
- Tourism in Israel

== Gallery ==
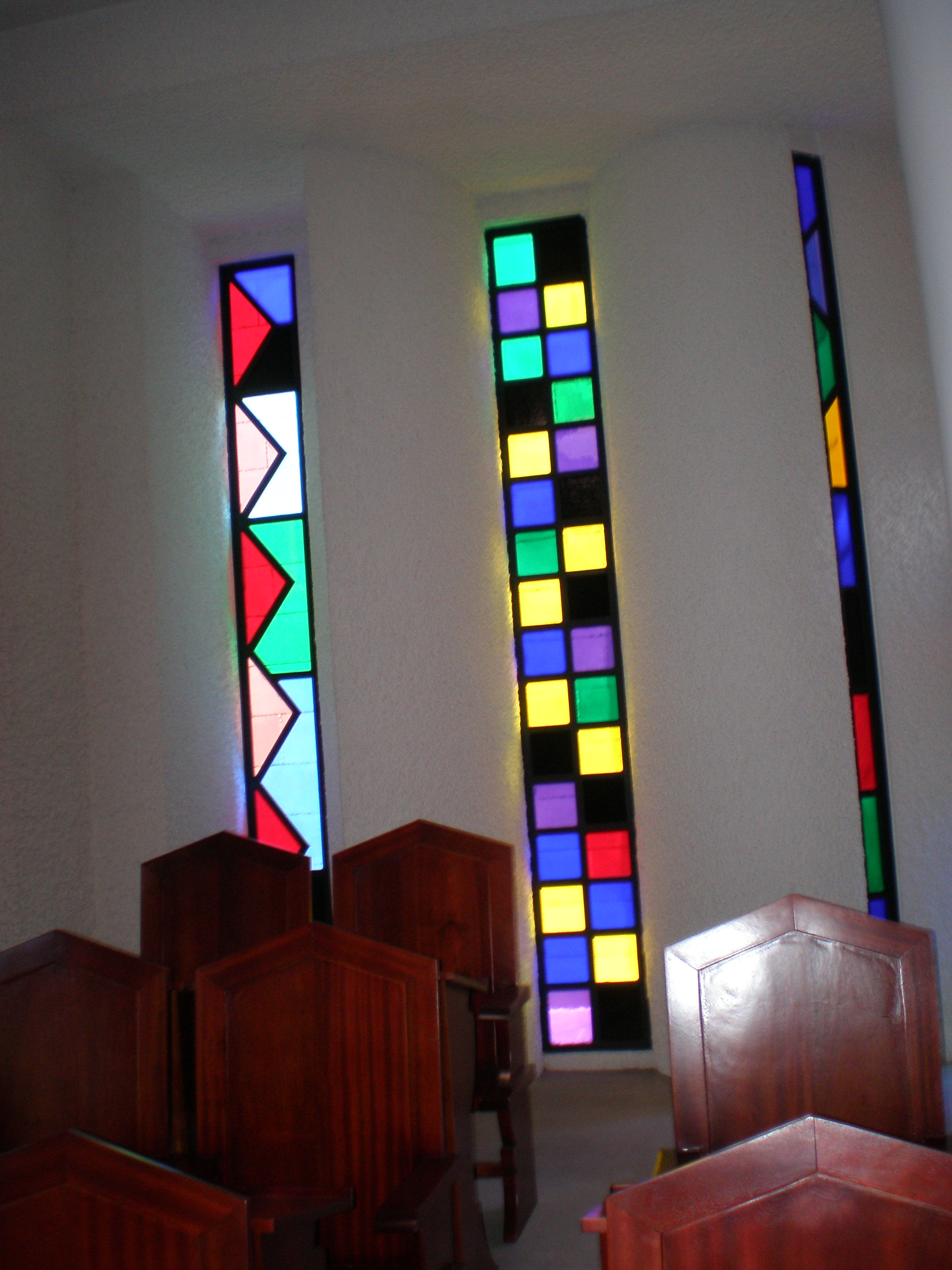
Domus Galilaeae congregation room window

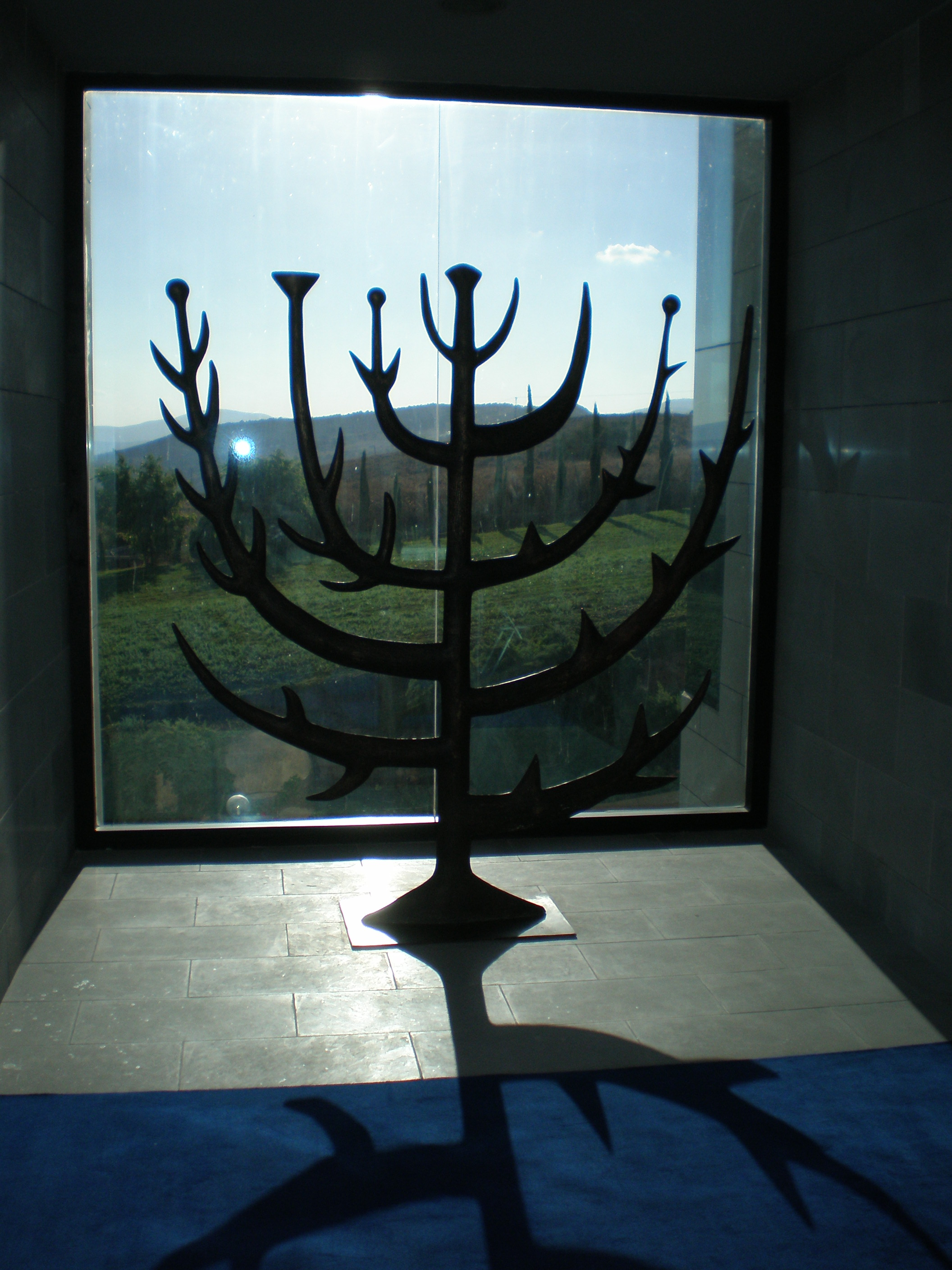
The Burning bush

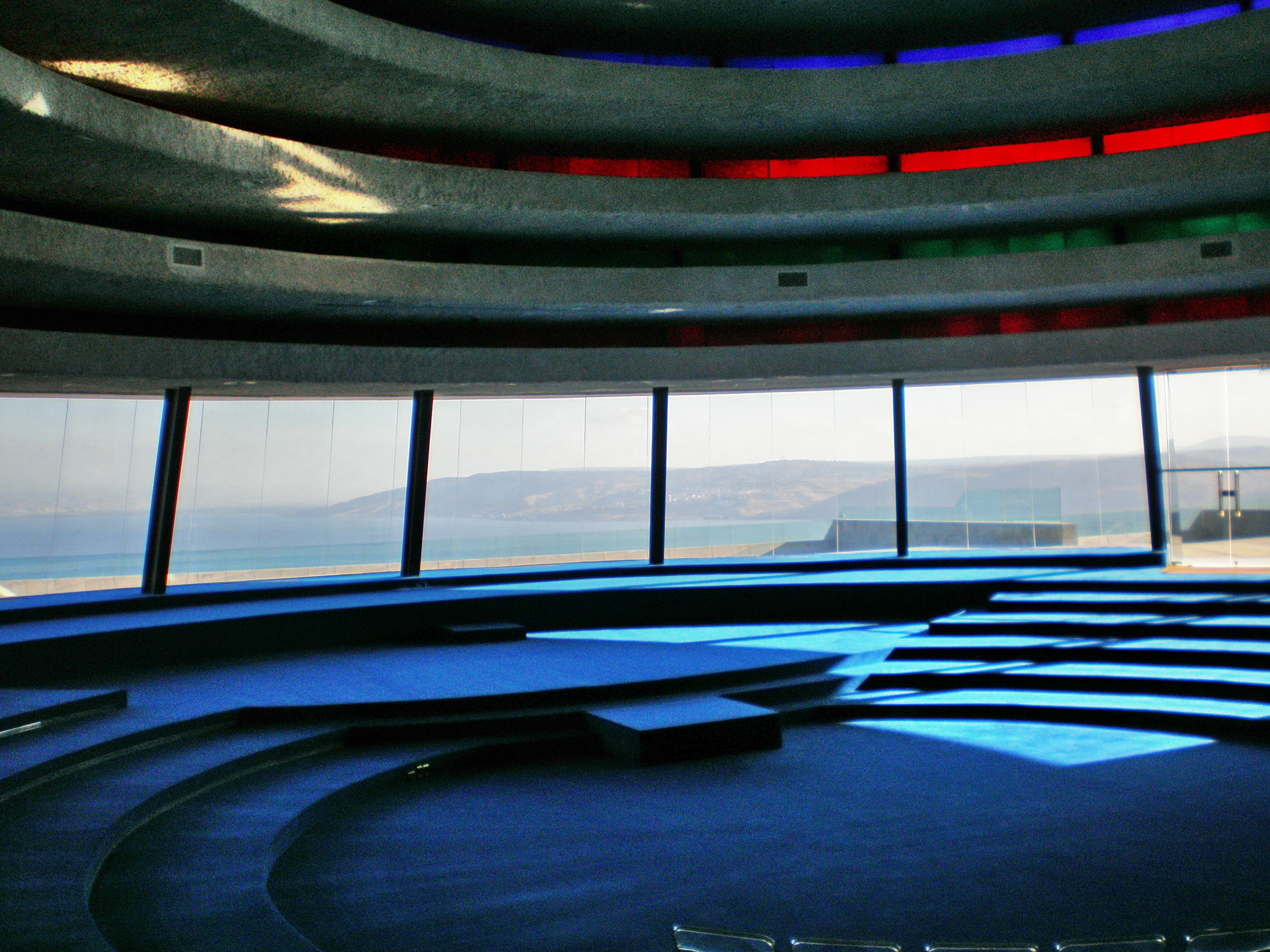
Meeting room with view of Sea of Galilee

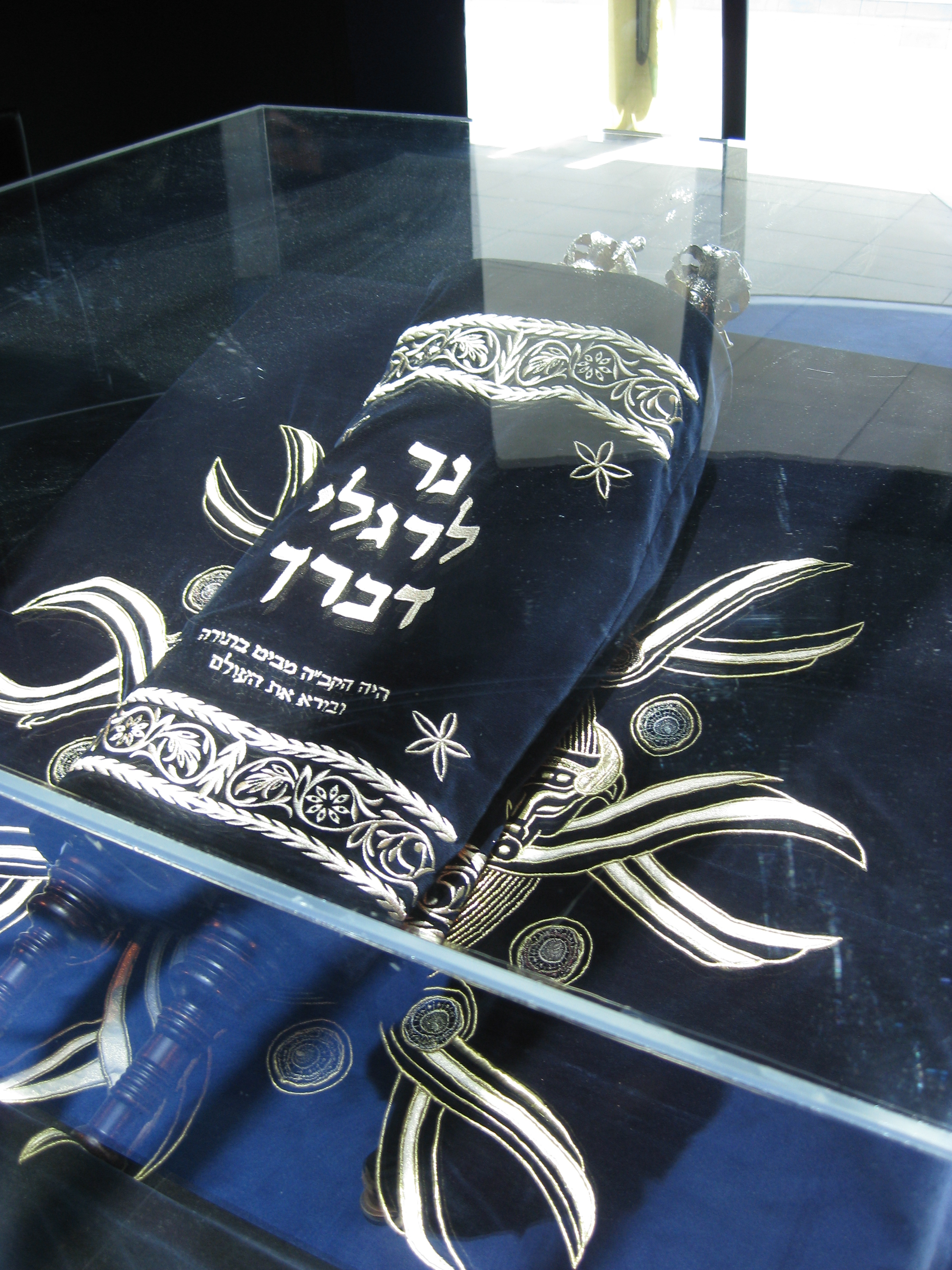
Torah in the library
