= Pian =

Pian may refer to:

- Pian (disease), a tropical infection of the skin, bones and joints
- Pian-e Olya, a village in Khuzestan Province, Iran
- Pian-e Sofla, a village in Khuzestan Province, Iran
- Pian Rural District, in Khuzestan Province, Iran
- Pian Camuno, a commune in the province of Brescia, in Lombardy, Italy
- Pian di Scò, a commune in the province of Arezzo, in Tuscany, Italy
- Pian, Uganda, a county of Moroto District, in Uganda
- Rulan Chao Pian, ethnomusicologist and scholar of Chinese language.
- Pians also refers to seminarians and alumni of St. Pius X Seminary and Sancta Maria Mater et Regina Seminarium.
