= List of Catholic seminaries =

This is a list of Catholic seminaries in the world, including those that have been closed. According to the 2012 Pontifical Yearbook, the total number of candidates for the priesthood in the world was 118,990 at the end of the year 2010. These students were in 6,974 seminaries around the world: 3,194 diocesan seminaries and 3,780 religious seminaries.

== Africa ==
=== Benin ===
- Saint-Gall de Ouidah Major Seminary

=== Congo, Democratic Republic of ===
- Grand Séminaire de Lubumbashi – for the Roman Catholic Archdiocese of Lubumbashi
- Grand Séminaire Jean XXIII – for the Roman Catholic Archdiocese of Kinshasa

=== Ghana ===
- St. Gregory the Great Provincial Major Seminary – for the Roman Catholic Province of Kumasi
- St. Paul's Catholic Seminary (Philosophy)
- St. Peter's Regional Seminary (Theology)
- St. Victor's, Tamale
- St Teresa's Minor Seminary

=== Namibia ===
- St. Charles Lwanga Major Seminary – of Namibian Catholic Bishops' Conference

=== Nigeria ===
- St. John Vianney Seminary, Barkin Ladi – Established in January 1958 by the late Right Rev. Dr. John Reddington for the Roman Catholic Archdiocese of Jos.
- Seat of Wisdom Seminary – Established in 1982; for the Roman Catholic Archdiocese of Owerri
- Seat of Wisdom Seminary (philosophy Campus), Ariam-Umuahia
- Bigard Memorial Seminary, Enugu – A provincial seminary for the Onitsha ecclesiastical province, established in 1950.
- St Joseph Major Seminary, Ikot Ekpene
- St Thomas Aquinas Major Seminary, Makurdi
- St John Cross Seminary, Nsukka
- Pope John Paul II Major Seminary, Awka
- SS Peter and Paul, Bodija, Ibadan
- All Saints Seminary, Ekpoma
- Good Shepherd Major Seminary, Kaduna
- Claretian Institute of Philosophy, Nekede
- Spiritan International school of Theology, Attakwu
- Spiritan Institute of Philosophy, Isienu
- St Augustine Seminary, Jos
- Blessed Iwene Tansi Major Seminary, Onitsha
- The National Missionary Seminary of St Paul, Gwagwalada Abuja
- St Albert the Great Idowu Ofonron Abeokuta, Ogun State

=== South Africa (which included Eswatini, Lesotho and Botswana) ===
- St John Vianney Seminary, Pretoria (National Seminary)
- St Francis Xavier Orientation Year Seminary (Cape Town)
- Redemptoris Mater Seminary for training priests of the Neo-Catechumenal Way (Cape Town)
- St Joseph's Theological Institute (SJTI), founded in 1943 by the Oblates
- St Philip Neri collegium (Preparatory year seminary)
- St Peter's Major Seminary, originally for indigenous priests, merged into St. John Vianney's in 2008
- St. Paul’s Minor Seminary
- St. Augustine Major Seminary, in Lesotho, established 1924
- St. Charles Lwanga Minor Seminary, Botswana

=== Togo ===
- Jean Paul II Interdiocesan Major Seminary, Lomé
- St Paul Interdiocesan Major Seminary, Kpalimé
- Benoit XVI Interdiocesan Major Seminary, Tchitchao

=== Uganda ===
There are several seminaries in Uganda divided into three: Junior, Minor and Major seminaries.

Major seminaries

- Saint Mbaaga's Major Seminary Ggaba: Philosophy and Theology
- Ggaba National Major Seminary: Theology
- St. Thomas Aquinas National Seminary, Katigondo: Philosophy
- Uganda Martyr's National Major Seminary Alokolum: Philosophy
- Kinyamaskia National Major Seminary: Theology

Minor and Junior Seminaries

- Bukalasa National Minor Seminary, Villa Maria
- Christ the King Seminary, Kisubi
- St. Joseph's Seminary, Nyenga
- Mubende Seminary, Nandere,
- St. Mary's Seminary, Nadiket, Moroto City
- St. Charles Lwanga Seminary, Nyakibale, Rukungiri
- Saints Gabriel and Raphael Seminary, Nswanjere
- St. Pius X Seminary, Nagongera
- St. Paul's Seminary, Rushoroza, Kabale
- St. Francis Xavier Kitabi Minor Seminary, Bushenyi District
- Sacred Heart Mission for the Brothers of Divine Mercy; Missionary preparation
- Sacred Heart Seminary Lacor, Gulu City
- St. Peter's Seminary, Madera, Soroti City
- St. John Bosco Minor Seminary, Hoima
- Saints Peter & Paul Seminary, Pokea, Arua City.

== Americas ==
=== Argentina ===
Argentina has 32 major seminaries.

- Facultades de Filosofía y Teología de San Miguel, San Miguel, Buenos Aires
- Seminario Mayor Nuestra Señora de Luján – for the Archdiocese of La Plata
- Seminario Metropolitano de Buenos Aires – for the Archdiocese of Buenos Aires

=== Bolivia ===
- Seminario Mayor San luis, Cochabamba.

=== Brazil ===
By the 'Organización de Seminarios Latinoamericanos' (OSLAM), there are 429 seminaries in Brazil. The following list is by leading Ecclesiastical Provinces.

Aparecida

- Seminário Missionário Bom Jesus – founded in 1844; for the Roman Catholic Archdiocese of Aparecida
- Seminário Redentorista Santo Alfonso – for the Archdiocese of Aparecida

Belém do Pará

- Seminário Dom Oscar Romeo – for the Roman Catholic Archdiocese of Belém do Pará
- Seminário Maior Interdiocesano São Gaspar – for the Archdiocese of Belém

Belo Horizonte

- Seminário Coração Eucarísto de Jesus – for the Roman Catholic Archdiocese of Belo Horizonte
- Seminário Pavoniano Ludovico Pavani – for the Archdiocese of Belo Horizonte

Brasília

- Seminário Maior Arquidiocesano Nossa Senhora de Fátima — for the Roman Catholic Archdiocese of Brasília

Campinas

- Seminário Claret – for the Roman Catholic Archdiocese of Campinas
- Seminário da Imaculada Teologia – for the Archdiocese of Campinas

Cascavel

- Seminário Diocesano Maria Mãe de Igreja – for the Roman Catholic Diocese of Toledo, Brazil

Curitiba

- Seminário Arquidiocesano São José – for the Roman Catholic Archdiocese of Curitiba
- Seminário Nossa Senhora Consolata – for the Archdiocese of Curitiba

Fortaleza

- Seminário da Prainha – founded in 1864; for the Roman Catholic Archdiocese of Fortaleza
- Semonário Propedêutico D. Aluísio Lorscheider – for the Archdiocese of Fortaleza

Goiânia

- Seminário Interdiocesano São João Maria Vianney

Guarulhos

- Seminário Diocesano Imaculada Conceição – for the Roman Catholic Diocese of Guarulhos
- Seminário Propedêutico Santo Antônio – for the Roman Catholic Diocese of Guarulhos

Mariana

- Seminário Diocesano de Nossa Senhora do Rosário – for the Roman Catholic Diocese of Caratinga

Natal

- Seminário de São Pedro – for the Roman Catholic Archdiocese of Natal

Niteroi

- Seminário São José – for the Roman Catholic Archdiocese of Niterói
- Seminário São Vicente de Paulo – for the Roman Catholic Diocese of Petrópolis

Nova Friburgo

- Seminário Diocesano da Imaculada Conceição – for the Roman Catholic Diocese of Nova Friburgo

Olinda e Recife

- Seminário Arquidiocesano de Comunicação – for the Roman Catholic Archdiocese of Olinda e Recife

Porto Alegre

- Seminário Maior Arquidiocesno Nossa Senhora da Conceição – for the Archdiocese of Porto Alegre
- Seminário Maior João Duns Scotus – for the Archdiocese of Porto Alegre

São Paulo

- Seminário de Teologia Bom Pastor – for the Archdiocese of São Paulo
- Seminário de Filosofia Santa Cura d'Ars – for the Archdiocese of São Paulo
- Seminário Paulino – for the Archdiocese of São Paulo
- Seminário São Francisco de Paula – for the Archdiocese of São Paulo
- Missionário Saletinos – for the Archdiocese of São Paulo
- Missionário Teológico Santa Mônica – for the Archdiocese of São Paulo
- Seminário Frei Galvão – located in Guaratinguetá in the state of São Paulo
- Seminário Nossa Senhora Aparecida – for the Roman Catholic Diocese of Campo Limpo

São Salvador da Bahia

- Seminário Central São João Maria Vianney – for the Archdiocese of São Salvador da Bahia
- Seminário Maior Santana Mestra – for the Archdiocese of São Salvador da Bahia

São Sebastião do Rio de Janeiro

- Seminário São José – founded in 1739; for the Archdiocese of São Sebastião do Rio de Janeiro
- Seminário Maior Palotino – for the Archdiocese of Rio de Janeiro

Vitória

- Seminário Nossa Senhora da Penha – for the Roman Catholic Archdiocese of Vitória

=== Canada ===
Alberta

- St. Joseph Seminary (Edmonton, Alberta) – Opened in 1927

British Columbia

- Seminary of Christ the King – In Westminster Abbey of Benedictine, Mission; Founded in 1939

Ontario

- St. Augustine's Seminary – Archdiocesan seminary of the Archdiocese of Toronto; established in 1913
- St. Peter's Seminary – Located in the Diocese of London, Ontario. Established in 1912, and affiliated with King's University College, University of Western Ontario
- St. Philip's Seminary – Archdiocesan seminary of the Archdiocese of Toronto; established in 1986
- Serra House – Archdiocesan house of formation of the Archdiocese of Toronto where pre-theology seminarians reside; established in 1984 as a House of Discernment to the Priesthood

Quebec

- Grand séminaire de Montréal – Founded by the Society of Saint-Sulpice in 1840, serving the Roman Catholic Archdiocese of Montreal
- Séminaire de Québec – Founded in 1663; for the Roman Catholic Archdiocese of Quebec

Closed:

- Immaculate Conception Seminary, in Cornwall, Ontario, ran by the Legionaries of Christ.
- Séminaire de Chicoutimi, Quebec, – For the Roman Catholic Diocese of Chicoutimi
- Séminaire de Saint-Hyacinthe, Quebec, – For the Roman Catholic Diocese of Saint-Hyacinthe

=== Chile ===
- San Fidel Seminary, Pontifical Catholic University of Chile – In Santiago

=== Colombia ===
Colombia has 50 major seminaries.

- Major Seminary of Bogotá – for the Archdiocese of Bogotá
- Seminairo Misionero Arquidiocesano Redemptoris Mater de Medellin – for the Roman Catholic Archdiocese of Medellín
- Seminario Mayor Intermisional Colombiano San Luis Beltrán – located in Bogotá

=== Cuba ===
- San Carlos and San Ambrosio Seminary – Established in 1689; Serves the Archdiocese of Havana

=== Dominican Republic ===
- St. Thomas Aquinas Pontifical Seminary – for the Archdiocese of Santo Domingo

=== Ecuador ===
- Seminario Mayor San Jose, Quito

=== Mexico ===
There are 66 seminaries in Mexico. This list is by main Ecclesiastical Provinces.

Acapulco

- Seminario del Buen Pastor – for the Roman Catholic Archdiocese of Acapulco

Antequera, Oaxaca

- Seminario Pontificio de la Santa Cruz – for the Archdiocese of Antequera, Oaxaca

Chihuahua

- Seminario Arquidiocesano de Chihuahua, A.R. – for the Roman Catholic Archdiocese of Chihuahua

Durango

- Seminario Conciliar Mayor de Durango – for the Archdiocese of Durango

Guadalajara

- Seminario del Señor San José – for the Archdiocese of Guadalajara
- Seminario Diocesano de Guadalajara – for the Archdiocese of Guadalajara

Hermosillo

- Seminario Arquidiocesnao Juan Navarrete y Guerrero – for the Roman Catholic Archdiocese of Hermosillo

Jalapa

- Seminario Interdiocesano Rafael Guízar y Valecia – for the Roman Catholic Archdiocese of Jalapa

México

- Seminario Conciliar de México – for the Archdiocese of Mexico
- Seminario Méxicano para las Misiones Extranjeras – located in Mexico City

Monterrey

- Seminario Arquidiocesano de Monterrey – for the Archdiocese of Monterrey

Morelia

- Seminario Arquidiocesano de Morelia – for the Roman Catholic Archdiocese of Morelia

Puebla de los Angeles

- Pontificio Seminario Conciliar Palafoxiano Angelopolitano – for the Roman Catholic Archdiocese of Puebla de los Angeles

San Luis Potosí

- Seminarios Diocesanos de San Luis Potosi – for the Roman Catholic Archdiocese of San Luis Potosi
- Seminario Guadalupano y Josefino – For the Archdiocese of San Luis Potosi

Tlalnepantla

- Seminarios Diocesanos de Tlalnepantla – for the Roman Catholic Archdiocese of Tlalnepantla

Yucatán

- Seminario Conciliar de Nuestra Señora del Rosario y de San Ildefonso – for the Roman Catholic Archdiocese of Yucatán, located in the city of Mérida

=== Paraguay ===
- Seminario Mayor Nacional del Paraguay, Asuncion

=== Peru ===
- Seminario de Lima – for the Archdiocese of Lima
- Seminario de San Jerónimo – for the Archdiocese of Arequipa

=== Puerto Rico ===
- Interdiocesan Major Seminary Mary, Mother of Divine Providence (Ponce, Puerto Rico) – Interdiocesan seminary for the Ecclesiastical Province of San Juan de Puerto Rico for seminarians in the discipleship and configurative stages of formation.
- Propaedeutic Seminary Saint Paul VI (Naranjito, Puerto Rico) - Interdiocesan seminary for the Ecclesiastical Province of San Juan de Puerto Rico for seminarians in the propaedeutic stage of formation.

=== Trinidad and Tobago ===
- Regional Seminary of St John Vianney and the Ugandan Martyrs in Tunapuna, Trinidad – founded in 1943, became a regional seminary for the Antilles Episcopal Conference in 1970. Jamaican seminarians formerly at St. Michael's Theological College were moved to Trinidad in 1996.

=== United States ===
According to the 2010 Official Catholic Directory, as of 2009 there are 189 seminaries with 5,131 students in the United States; 3,319 diocesan seminarians and 1,812 religious seminarians. By the official 2011 statistics, there are 5,247 seminarians (3,394 diocesan and 1,853 religious) in the United States.

California

- Dominican School of Philosophy and Theology (Berkeley) – Run by the Dominican Friars; opened in 1964.
- Franciscan School of Theology (Oceanside) – Run by the Franciscan Friars; opened in 1854.
- Immaculate Conception Apostolic School (Colfax) – Was run by the Legionaries of Christ but closed in 2011.
- Jesuit School of Theology of Santa Clara University (Berkeley) – Run by the Society of Jesus; opened in 1969.
- Juan Diego House (Gardena) – Archdiocesan seminary.
- St. Anthony Seminary & College (Santa Barbara) – Was run by the Franciscan Friars; opened in 1901 but closed in 1987.
- St. John's Seminary (Camarillo) – Archdiocesan seminary; opened in 1939. Formerly operated by the Congregation of the Mission from 1939 to 1987.
- St. Patrick Seminary (Menlo Park) – Archdiocesan seminary; opened in 1898.
- St. Peter Chanel Seminary (Berkeley) – Run by the Marist Fathers.
- Blessed Junipero Serra House of Formation (Grand Terrace, California) – Run by the Diocese of San Bernardino; opened in 1995.

Colorado

- St. John Vianney Seminary (Denver) – Archdiocesan seminary; opened in 1999. Opened at the site of the former St. Thomas Seminary operated by the Congregation of the Mission from 1907 to 1995.
- Redemptoris Mater Seminary (Denver) – Archdiocesan missionary seminary consisting of vocations from the Neocatechumenal Way; opened in 1996.

Connecticut

- Holy Apostles Seminary (Cromwell) – Diocesan seminary; opened in 1960. Formerly run by the Missionaries of the Holy Apostles.
- Novitiate and College of Humanities of the Legionaries of Christ (Cheshire) – Seminary currently run by the Legionaries of Christ.
- St. John Fisher Seminary Residence (Stamford) – Diocesan seminary; opened in 1989.
- St. Thomas Seminary (Bloomfield) – Archdiocesan seminary; opened in 1897, and closed in the 1990s.

District of Columbia

- Saint John Paul II Seminary – Archdiocese of Washington; opened in 2011.
- Dominican House of Studies – Run by the Dominican Friars; opened in 1905.
- Redemptoris Mater Seminary – Archdiocesan missionary seminary consisting of vocations from the Neocatechumenal Way; erected 2001.
- Theological College – Run by the Society of St. Sulpice; opened in 1917.
- Washington Theological Union – Sponsored by seven religious communities; opened in 1968, closed in 2015.
- St. Joseph's Seminary – major seminary run by the Josephites, founded in 1888; later an independent academic seminary, but residential-only beginning in the early 1970s

Florida

- St. John Vianney College Seminary (Miami) – Founded in 1959
- St. Vincent de Paul Regional Seminary (Boynton Beach) – Diocesan seminary; founded in 1963.
- Redemptoris Mater Seminary (Miami) – Archdiocesan missionary seminary consisting of vocations from the Neocatechumenal Way; opened 2011.

Illinois

- Catholic Theological Union (Chicago) – Run by twenty-four various religious institutes; opened in 1968.
- University of Saint Mary of the Lake (Mundelein) – Archdiocesan major seminary; opened in 1921.

Indiana

- Bishop Simon Bruté College Seminary (Indianapolis) – Archdiocesan seminary; opened in 2004.
- Moreau Seminary (Notre Dame) – Run by the Congregation of Holy Cross; opened in 1958.
- Old College, University of Notre Dame (Notre Dame) – Undergraduate seminary of the Congregation of Holy Cross; opened in 1843.
- Sacred Heart Apostolic School (Rolling Prairie) – Run by the Legionaries of Christ; opened in 2005.
- Saint Meinrad School of Theology (St. Meinrad) – Run by the Benedictine Monks; opened in 1857.

Iowa

- Divine Word College (Epworth) – Run by the Society of the Divine Word; opened in 1931
- St. Pius X Seminary at Loras College (Dubuque) – Archdiocesan seminary; opened in 1839.

Kansas

St. Philip Neri Seminary (Wichita)

Louisiana

- Notre Dame Seminary (New Orleans) – Archdiocesan seminary; opened in 1923.
- St. Joseph Seminary College (St. Benedict) – Run by the Benedictine Monks; opened in 1891.
- Maryhill Seminary (Pineville) – Diocesan seminary; opened date and closed date TBA

Maryland

- Fulton Sheen House of Formation (Chillum) – Run by the Institute of the Incarnate Word; opened in 1998.
- Mount St. Mary's Seminary (Emmitsburg) – Archdiocesan seminary; opened in 1808.
- St. Mary's Seminary (Baltimore) – Archdiocesan seminary; opened in 1791.

Massachusetts

- Pope St. John XXIII National Seminary (Weston) – Archdiocesan seminary for adult vocations; opened in 1964.
- Our Lady of Grace Seminary (Boston) – Run by the Oblates of the Virgin Mary; opened in 1978.
- Redemptoris Mater Seminary (Chestnut Hill) – Archdiocesan missionary seminary consisting of vocations from the Neocatechumenal Way; erected 2005.
- St. John's Seminary (Boston) – Archdiocesan seminary; opened in 1884.
- Queen of Apostles Seminary – operated by the Society of African Missions from 1946 to the late 1960s.

Michigan

- Sacred Heart Major Seminary (Detroit) – Archdiocesan seminary; opened in 1919.

Minnesota

- Blessed Jose Sanchez del Rio Minor Seminary (Mankato) -High school seminary run by the Institute of the Incarnate Word; opened in 2008.
- Immaculate Heart of Mary Seminary (Winona) – Diocesan seminary; opened in 1948.
- Saint John's School of Theology∙Seminary (Collegeville) – Saint John's School of Theology∙Seminary; opened in 1857 as Saint John's Seminary.
- St. John Vianney College Seminary (St. Paul)
- Saint Paul Seminary School of Divinity (St. Paul) – Archdiocesan seminary; opened in 1894.

Missouri

- Conception Seminary College (Conception) – Run by the Benedictine Monks; opened in 1886.
- Kenrick–Glennon Seminary (Shrewsbury, St. Louis County) – Run by the Archdiocese of Saint Louis; founded in 1898.
- St. Mary's of the Barrens Seminary (Perryville) – Run by the Congregation of the Mission; operated 1818–1995.
- St. Vincent's Seminary (Cape Girardeau) – Run by the Congregation of the Mission; operated 1838–1979 as a minor seminary.

Nebraska

- Our Lady of Guadalupe Seminary (Denton) – Run by the Priestly Fraternity of St. Peter; opened in 2000.
- St. Gregory the Great Seminary (Seward) – Diocesan seminary; opened in 1998

New Jersey

- Immaculate Conception Seminary School of Theology (South Orange) – Founded in 1860 and part of Seton Hall University.
- Redemptoris Mater Seminary (Kearny, New Jersey) – Archdiocesan missionary seminary consisting of vocations from the Neocatechumenal Way; opened in 1991. Undergraduate and graduate theological studies take place at Seton Hall University.
- The College Seminary of the Immaculate Conception at St. Andrew's Hall (South Orange, New Jersey) – Diocesan Minor Seminary located on the campus of Seton Hall University.
- Blessed John Neumann Preparatory Seminary (Wayne, New Jersey) – Diocesan minor seminary founded in 1965; became co-ed college prep with name changed to Neumann Prep in the late 1970s; closed 1990.
- St. Anthony's Mission House – former seminary run by the Society of African Missions. Intended as an interracial institution open to African Americans, but folded quickly.

New York

- St. Joseph's Seminary (Dunwoodie) – Archdiocesan seminary; opened in 1896. From September 2013, it received students from the closed Seminary of the Immaculate Conception. It provides formation in the Greater New York Area (the Archdiocese, Brooklyn, and Rockville Center).

North Carolina

- St Joseph College Seminary (Charlotte) – Diocesan Minor Seminary located on the Campus of Belmont Abbey College by the Diocese of Charlotte and assisted by the Benedictine Monks of Belmont Abbey; opened in 2016.

Ohio

- Athenaeum of Ohio-Mount St. Mary Seminary (Cincinnati) – Diocesan seminary; opened in 1829
- Borromeo College Seminary (Cleveland) – Diocesan seminary; opened in 1953.
- Pontifical College Josephinum (Columbus) – International seminary of pontifical status; opened in 1888
- Saint Mary Seminary and Graduate School of Theology (Cleveland) – Established in 1848

Oregon

- Mount Angel Seminary (St. Benedict) – Run by the Order of Saint Benedict; opened in 1889.

Pennsylvania

- Byzantine Catholic Seminary of Ss. Cyril and Methodius (Pittsburgh) – Metropolitan Ruthenian seminary established in 1950
- Saint Charles Borromeo Seminary (Philadelphia) – Archdiocesan seminary; opened in 1832. The current Theological Building was completed in 1871.
- St. Paul Seminary (Pittsburgh) – Diocesan seminary for the Diocese of Pittsburgh.
- St. Vincent Seminary (Latrobe) – Diocesan seminary; Benedictine affiliated; opened in 1855.
- St. Mark Seminary (Erie) – Diocesan seminary.
- Redemptoris Mater Seminary (Philadelphia) – Archdiocesan missionary seminary consisting of vocations from the Neocatechumenal Way. Undergraduate and graduate theological studies take place at Saint Charles Borromeo Seminary.

Rhode Island

- Our Lady of Providence Seminary (Providence, Rhode Island) – Diocesan seminary; opened in 1942.

Texas

- Assumption Seminary (San Antonio) – Archdiocesan seminary; established in 1915.
- Holy Trinity Seminary (Irving) – Diocesan seminary; established in 1964.
- Oblate School of Theology (San Antonio) – Run by the Oblates of Mary Immaculate; opened in 1903.
- St. Anthony Junior Seminary (San Antonio) – Run by the Oblates of Mary Immaculate; operated from 1905 to 1995. Taken over by the University of the Incarnate Word in 1995.
- St. Charles Seminary (Texas) (El Paso) – Diocesan seminary.
- St. Mary Seminary (Houston) – Archdiocesan seminary.
- San Antonio de Padua Seminary (El Paso) – Franciscan theological seminary for Mexican province.
- Redemptoris Mater Seminary (Dallas) – Diocesan missionary seminary consisting of vocations from the Neocatechumenal Way.

Washington

- Bishop White Seminary at Gonzaga University (Spokane) – Diocesan seminary

Wisconsin

- Sacred Heart Seminary and School of Theology (Hales Corners) – Run by the Priests of the Sacred Heart; opened in 1932.
- Saint Francis de Sales Seminary (Milwaukee) – Archdiocesan seminary; opened in 1845.
- St. Lawrence Seminary High School (Mount Calvary) – Run by the Capuchin Friars; opened in 1860.

=== Uruguay ===
- Mayor Interdiocesano Cristo Rey, Montevideo

=== Venezuela ===
- Seminario Mayor Santa Rosa de Lima – for the Archdiocese of Caracas

== Asia/Pacific ==
=== Australia ===
New South Wales and Australian Capital Territory

- Seminary of the Good Shepherd – established at Homebush in 1996 by then Cardinal Edward Bede Clancy, is the seminary of the Archdiocese of Sydney, as well as NSW and ACT.
- Holy Spirit Seminary – established at St Mary's in the Diocese of Parramatta by Bishop Kevin Manning in 2008.
- Redemptoris Mater – seminary of the Archdiocese of Sydney for the Neocatechumenal Way.
- St Patrick's College – opened in 1889, was located at Manly. The seminary closed in 2005.
- Vianney College – established in Wagga Wagga by Bishop William Brennan in 1992.

Queensland

- Pius XII Provincial Seminary, Brisbane – closed 2001.
- Holy Spirit Seminary, Brisbane – established by the Queensland Bishops in 2007 and opened by Cardinal Levada

South Australia

- St Francis Xavier Seminary, Adelaide – closed 2001.

Victoria and Tasmania

- Corpus Christi College – established at Werribee in 1923 by Archbishop Daniel Mannix for the dioceses of Victoria, and later Tasmania as well. Moved to Glen Waverley in 1960, then to Clayton in 1973 and presently to Carlton in 2000.

Western Australia

- Redemptoris Mater – seminary of the Archdiocese of Perth for the Neo-Catechumenal Way.
- St. Charles Borromeo Seminary – established by Archbishop Barry James Hickey for the West Australian dioceses.

=== Bangladesh ===
Dhaka

- St. Joseph's Seminary – for the Roman Catholics of Bangladesh
- Holy Spirit Major Seminary – for the Roman Catholics of Bangladesh

=== China ===
Hong Kong

- Holy Spirit Seminary – for the Roman Catholic Diocese of Hong Kong

Macau

- Seminário de São José (Macau) – for the Roman Catholic Diocese of Macau

=== Fiji ===
- Pacific Regional Seminary of St Peter Chanel, Suva (founded 1972)

=== Guam ===
- Saint John Paul the Great Archdiocesan Seminary of Guam, Malojloj
- Redemptoris Mater (seminary) (Guam) – Archdiocesan missionary seminary consisting of vocations from the Neocatechumenal Way.

=== India ===
- St.Mary's Minor Seminary, Thanjavur.
- Good Shepherd Seminary, Coimbatore
- Little Flower Seminary, Institute of Philosophy and Religion, Aluva – 683101, Kerala, India (Run by CST Fathers, 1961)
- ST MARYS MINOR SEMINARY THRISSUR
- ST MARYS MINOR SEMINARY PALAKKAD
- ST ALPHONSA MINOR SEMINARY THAMARASERRY
- ST JOSEPH MINOR SEMINARY THALASERY
- MSFS MINOR SEMINARY ALATTUR
- BETHLEHEM MINOR SEMINARY ELENJIPARA CHALAKUDY
- Jnana-Deepa Vidyapeeth Pontifical Institution of Philosophy and Religion, Pune – Founded in 1905 and run by Jesuits.
- Mary Matha Major Seminary: Seminary is run by Syro-Malabar Catholic Archdiocese of Thrissur
- Papal Seminary Pune – run by Jesuits.
- Divyadaan: Salesian Institute of Philosophy, Nashik – run by Salesians of Don Bosco
- Rachol Seminary – founded in 1521 for the church of Goa
- Chorão Seminary founded in 1761
- Morning Star Seminary College, Kolkata West Bengal
- Society of the Missionaries of St. Francis Xavier, Pilar – founded in 1887
- St. Aloysius Seminary, Trivandrum – minor seminary for the Syro-Malankara Archeparchy of Trivandrum
- St. John's Regional Seminary – founded in 1965 for the church of Andhra Pradesh theology
- St John's regional seminary Hyderabad philosophy
- St. Joseph's Inter-diocesan Seminary, Mangalore – first established in 1763 and later at the current location in 1879
- St. Mary's Malankara Major Seminary – center of priestly training of the Syro-Malankara Catholic Church
- St. Thomas Apostolic Seminary, Vadavathoor, Kottayam, Kerala
- St. Agnes Minor Seminary, Cuddalore, Tamil Nadu
- Good Shepherd Seminary, Coimbatore, Tamil Nadu
- St. Peter's Pontifical Institute of Philosophy and Theology (Major Seminary), Bangalore
- St. Pauls's seminary, Trichy
- St Joseph's Pontifical seminary, Mangalapuzha, Aluva syro Malabar
- St Joseph Pontifical Seminary Carmelgiri, Alwaye, Latin
- Rahulaya seminary
- St Paul's minor seminary irinjalakuda,
- vidyajoythi theology college Jesuits, delhi
- Dharmaram College, Major Seminary of Carmelites of Mary Immaculate, Bangalore
- Dharmaram Vidya Kshetram, Carmelites of Mary Immaculate, Pontifical Athanaeum of Philosophy Theology and Canon Law
- Good Shepherd Minor Seminary, Pala, India
- Good Shepherd Major Seminary, Kunnoth, India
- St Paul's Minor Seminary, Akalpur, Jammu
- John Paul Minor Seminary Thrissur
- Khrist Premalaya Ttheologicate Asta
- Khrist Premalaya Philosophyate Bhopal
- Satna st Ephream Seminary Syro Malabar, Madya Pradesh
- St Charles seminary nagapur*
- St pius seminary college mumbai
- St Albert seminary college ranchi
- St joseph seminary Mangalore
- sadhana Kendra regional spirituality centre risda bilaspur cathisgarh
- Sacred Heart Seminary, Poonamalle, Chennai
- Mary Matha Sheonstatt Minor Seminary Anathadam Alur, Thrissur
- St Theresa novitiate house Kottakal Mala thrissur cmi congregation
- Bethelahem minor seminary elinjipara chalakudy thrissur
- Alpha institute of theology and science thalaserry kannur kerala thalassery arch diocese
- Divine bible college murigoor chalakudy managed by Vincentian fathers
- Sacred Heart bhavan seminary alur thrissur
- Carmel Hill Philosophy College, Vazhuthacaud, Cotton Hill, Trivandrum by OCD Fathers
- Carmelaram Theology College, Carmelaram P.O., Bangalore by OCD Fathers
- St. Joseph's Major Seminary, Institute of Philosophy and Theology, Khammam, T.S., by HGN Congregation
- Mount Carmel Petit Seminary Fortcochin, Diocese of Cochin
- Holy Cross Study House Alwaye, Diocese of Cochin.
- St. Raphael's Minor Seminary, Fatima Road, Kollam, Roman Catholic Diocese Of Quilon

=== Indonesia ===
- St. Peter Canisius Minor Seminary, Mertoyudan, Magelang
- Seminari Agung Santo Paulus, Keuskupan Agung Semarang, Yogyakarta
- Seminari Menengah Wacana Bhakti, Kolese Gonzaga, Keuskupan Agung Jakarta, Jakarta
- Seminari Menengah St. Yohanes Berkhmans Todabelu-Flores, Keuskupan Agung Ende, Flores
- Seminari Menengah Stella Maris, Keuskupan Bogor, Bogor, Jawa Barat
- Seminari Menengah Cadas Hikmat, Keuskupan Bandung, Bandung Jawa Barat
- Seminari Tinggi Fermentum, Keuskupan Bandung, Bandung, Jawa Barat
- Seminari Menengah Santo Paulus Palembang, Keuskupan Agung Palembang
- Seminari Menengah Santo Petrus Aek Tolang, Keuskupan Sibolga
- Seminari Menengah Christus Sacerdos Pematangsiantar, Keuskupan Agung Medan
- Seminari Tinggi Santo Petrus Pematangsiantar, Keuskupan Agung Medan
- Saint John Paul II Major Seminary, Archdiocese of Jakarta, Jakarta, Indonesia
- St. Peter Major Seminary, Flores

=== Israel and Palestinian Territories ===
- The Latin Patriarchate Seminary – in Beit Jala near Jerusalem, originally opened in 1852
- Custody of the Holy Land – in Jerusalem in the Old City of Jerusalem, originally opened in 1219
- (Redemptoris Mater Galilee Seminary)

=== Japan ===
- Japan Catholic Seminary – two campuses; one in the Sulpician Seminary of Fukuoka, the other in Tokyo

=== Kazakhstan ===
- Mary, Mother of the Church Seminary – Located in Maikuduk, Karaganda

=== Malaysia ===
- College General – Located in Tanjung Bungah, Penang
- St Peter's Major Seminary, Kuching

=== New Zealand ===
- Good Shepherd College – Auckland, founded in 2001.
- Holy Cross Seminary – Founded in Dunedin in 1900, relocated to Auckland in 1997. National Seminary for the six dioceses of New Zealand.
- Holy Name Seminary – established in Christchurch, New Zealand in 1947; closed at the end of 1978 (was staffed by the Society of Jesus).
- St Mary's Seminary – established in 1850 by New Zealand's first Catholic Bishop, Jean Baptiste François Pompallier and closed in 1869 when Pompallier left the country.
- The Marist Seminary – for the training of Marist priests. It was first opened in 1889 in Hawkes Bay and was relocated to Auckland in 1992.

=== Pakistan ===
- Christ the King Seminary – seminary in Karachi, founded in 1956
- Redemptoris Mater Missionary Seminary – Karachi, founded in 2006
- St. Francis Xavier Seminary – Lahore, founded in 1994
- St. Mary's Minor Seminary, Lahore
- Our Lady of Lourdes Minor Seminary, Islamabad-Rawalpindi, founded in 1995
- St. Pius X Minor Seminary – Karachi, founded in 1958
- St. Thomas the Apostle Minor Seminary, Faisalabad, founded in 1981

=== Philippines ===
- Our Lady of Sheshan Major Seminary of the Institute of the Incarnate Word, San Celestino, Lipa City
- Our Lady of La Salette College Seminary (Silang, Cavite)
- St. Augustine Minor Seminary-Minor Seminary of Iba, Zambales, Luzon covering Olongapo City and Zambales Province
- Augustinian Novitiate and Prayer House (Talisay City, Cebu) – Novitiate House of the Augustinian, Province of Sto. Niño de Cebu
- Society of the Divine Savior (Salvatorians) Father Otto Hopfenmuller Formation House, [Loyola Heights, Quezon City]
- Adorno Fathers Seminary (Vinzons, Camarines Norte) – Formation House Seminary of the Clerics Regular Minor Philippines
- Divine Word Seminary -Tagaytay
- San Jacinto Seminary (Penablanca, Cagayan) – Minor Seminary of the Archdiocese of Tuguegarao
- Thomas Aquinas Major Seminary (Aparri, Cagayan) – Major Seminary of the Archdiocese of Tuguegarao
- Blessed John XXIII Seminary (Cebu City)
- Christ the King Mission Seminary (Quezon City) – run by the Divine Word Missionaries
- Cor Jesu Seminary (Dipolog)
- Father Hannibal Formation Center – Manila (Parañaque) – run by the Rogationists of the Heart of Jesus for seminarians from Luzon
- Saint Hannibal Formation Center – Cebu (Cebu City) – run by the Rogationists of the Heart of Jesus for seminarians from Visayas and Mindanao
- Diocesan Seminary of the Heart of Jesus (San Fernando La Union) – minor seminary
- Holy Rosary Seminary (Naga and San Jose, Camarines Sur) – seminary of the Archdiocese of Caceres
- Holy Trinity College Seminary (Daet, Camarines Norte) – college seminary of the Diocese of Daet
- Immaculate Conception School of Theology (Vigan, Ilocos Sur)
- Immaculate Conception Minor Seminary (Vigan, Ilocos Sur)
- Immaculate Conception Minor Seminary (Guiguinto, Bulacan) – Minor seminary of the Diocese of Malolos
- Immaculate Conception Major Seminary (Guiguinto, Bulacan) – Major seminary of the Diocese of Malolos
- Immaculate Conception Major Seminary- Graduate School of Theology (Guiguinto, Bulacan) – Graduate School of Theology of the Diocese of Malolos
- Immaculate Heart of Mary Seminary (Tagbilaran City, Bohol)
- John Paul II Minor Seminary (Antipolo, Rizal) – high school seminary of the Diocese of Antipolo
- Maradjao Magbalantay College Seminary (Surigao City, Surigao del Norte) – college seminary of the Diocese of Surigao
- Little Way College Seminary Kabankalan City, – college seminary of the Diocese of Kabankalan
- Maria Assumpta Seminary (Cabanatuan) – high school and college seminary of the Diocese of Cabanatuan
- Mary Cause of Our Joy College Seminary (Bacarra) – Major Seminary of the Diocese of Laoag
- Mary Help of Christians College Seminary (Dagupan)
- Mary Help of Christians School Seminary (Binmaley, Pangasinan)
- Mary Help of Christians Theology Seminary (San Fabian, Pangasinan)
- Mary's Children Formation College (Tungkop, Minlanilla Cebu)
- Maryhurst Seminary (Baguio)
- Mater Salutis College Seminary (Legazpi City, Albay) – college seminary of the Diocese of Legazpi
- Mission Society of the Philippines (Tagaytay, Cavite and Cebu City) – Official Missionary Arm of the Philippine Roman Catholic Church
- Mother of Good Counsel Seminary (San Fernando City, Pampanga) – seminary of the Archdiocese of San Fernando de Pampanga
- Mount Saint Aloysius College Seminary (Gumaca, Quezon) – college seminary of the Diocese of Gumaca
- The Nativity of Our Lady College Seminary (Borongan, Eastern Samar)
- Oblates of St. Joseph Major Seminary (Lipa City, Batangas)
- Oblates of St. Joseph Minor Seminary (San Jose, Batangas) – high school seminary
- Our Lady of Guadalupe Minor Seminary (Makati) – high school seminary of the Archdiocese of Manila
- Our Lady of Guadalupe Diocesan Seminary (Kidapawan City)
- Our Lady of Lourdes Seminary (Lipa City, Batangas) – (OFM Cap.) Capuchin Formation House of the Order of Friars Minor-Capuchin in the Philippines
- Our Lady of Mount Carmel Seminary (Sariaya, Quezon) – Minor Seminary, Diocese of Lucena
- Our Lady of Peace College Seminary (Tarlac City) – Diocese of Tarlac
- Our Lady of Penafrancia Seminary (Sorsogon City) – high school and college seminary of the Diocese of Sorsogon
- Our Lady of Perpetual Help Seminary (Koronadal City) – Minor Seminary, Diocese of Marbel
- Our Lady of the Angels Seminary (Quezon City) – (OFM) Franciscan College Seminary
- Our Lady of the Most Holy Rosary Seminary (Lucban, Quezon) – Major seminary, Diocese of Lucena
- Our Lady of the Visitacion Seminary- Cauayan city Isabela
- Pope Paul VI Minor Seminary (Maasin City, Southern Leyte)
- Queen of Apostles College Seminary (Tagum City)
- St. Francis Xavier Regional Major Seminary of Mindanao (Davao City)
- Sacred Heart Seminary – Bacolod (Bacolod)
- Sacred Heart Seminary (Palo, Leyte)
- Sancta Maria, Mater et Regina, Seminarium (Cagay, Roxas City, Capiz) – major seminary of the Archdiocese of Capiz
- Saint Albert the Great Seminary (Calamba, Laguna) – pre-novitiate house of the Order of Preachers (Dominicans) Philippine Province
- Saint Alphonsus Regional Seminary (Lucena City, Quezon) – Theologate Degree, Diocese of Lucena
- St. Anthony High School Seminary (Masbate)
- Saint Anthony Mary Claret Seminary (Culiat, Quezon City) – College Seminary of the Claretian Missionaries in the Philippines and Vietnam
- San Antonio Maria Claret House (Tandang Sora, Quezon City) – Theology house of the Claretian Missionaries
- Saint Augustine Senior-Major Seminary (Tagaytay, Cavite) – seminary of the Apostolic Vicariate of Calapan
- St. Camillus College Seminary (Marikina)
- Saint Francis de Sales Minor Seminary (Lipa City, Batangas) – Minor (High School) Seminary of the Archdiocese of Lipa
- Saint Francis de Sales Institute of Formation (Marawoy, Lipa City, Batangas) – Pre-College Seminary of the Archdiocese of Lipa
- Saint Francis de Sales Major Seminary (Marawoy, Lipa City, Batangas) – Major (College) Seminary of the Archdiocese of Lipa
- Saint Francis de Sales Theological Seminary (Marawoy, Lipa City, Batangas)- Theology Seminary of the Archdiocese of Lipa
- St. Francis Xavier Seminary (Baguio)
- St. Francis Xavier College Seminary (Davao City)
- St. Gregory the Great Seminary (Panal, Tabaco City); Celebrating 50 years in Panal 2–3 September 2010. Minor Seminary for the Diocese of Legazpi
- St. John Evangelist School of Theology – seminary of the Archdiocese of Palo, Leyte
- St. John Ma. Vianney Formation House (Antipolo)
- St. John the Baptist the Precursor Seminary (Marikina)
- St. John Paul II College Seminary (Ozamiz) - College Seminary of the Archdiocese of Ozamis
- St. John Vianney Theological Seminary (Cagayan de Oro)
- St. Joseph Major Seminary (Infanta, Quezon)
- St. Joseph Pre-College Seminary (Alaminos, Pangasinan)
- St. Joseph Seminary (Bangued, Abra)
- Saint Joseph Seminary (Dumaguete, Negros Oriental)
- St. Joseph Seminary (Ipil)
- Saint Joseph Regional Seminary (Jaro, Iloilo City) – Major Seminary of the Archdiocese of Jaro
- Saint Joseph Seminary (Puerto Princesa City, Palawan)
- St. Mary's Seminary (Laoag City, Ilocos Norte) – Minor Seminary of the Diocese of Laoag
- St. Mary's Theologate (Ozamiz City)
- Sto. Nino Seminary (Numancia, Aklan) – minor and college
- St. Paul Seminary Foundation (Silang, Cavite)
- St. Peter College Seminary (Butuan)
- St. Peter's Seminary (Mountain Province)
- St. Pius X Seminary (Lawaan, Roxas City, Capiz) – minor seminary of the Archdiocese of Capiz
- St. Therese Pre-College Seminary (Mati City, Davao Oriental)
- St. Vincent de Paul College Seminary (Calbayog, Samar)
- Saint Vincent Ferrer Seminary – (Jaro, Iloilo City) – Minor Seminary of the Archdiocese of Jaro
- Seminario Mayor de San Carlos (Mabolo, Cebu City)
- San Carlos Seminary (Makati) – the Royal and Conciliar major seminary of the Archdiocese of Manila
- San Agustin Center of Studies (Quezon City, Philippines) – Theology Seminary of the Augustinian, Province of Sto. Niño de Cebu
- San Agustin Seminary (Guadalupe Viejo, Makati) – Late Vocations Seminary of the Augustinian, Province of Sto. Niño de Cebu
- San Carlos Seminary College (Cebu City)
- San Jose de Mindanao College Seminary (Cagayan de Oro)
- San Jose Seminary (Katipunan, Quezon City) – Jesuit-run seminary for diocesan priests; in Ateneo de Manila University
- San Lorenzo Ruiz Seminary (Odiongan, Romblon)
- San Pablo Seminary (Baguio) – major seminary (regional philosophy seminary of Northern Luzon)
- Seminario de San Jose (Puerto Princesa City, Palawan) – minor and major seminary
- Seminario de Jesus Nazareno (Borongan, Eastern Samar)
- Seminario Mayor Recoletos (Baguio)
- University of Santo Tomas Central Seminary – Dominican-run inter-diocesan seminary of the Philippines, found within the vicinity of the University of Santo Tomas in Manila
- Vincent Hills Seminary (Angono, Rizal)
- Don Bosco Prenovitiate Seminary (Canlubang, Calamba, Laguna)
- Don Bosco Sacred Heart Posnovitiate Seminary (Canlubang, Calamba, Laguna)
- Seminaryo ng Don Bosco (Parañaque)
- Sons of Holy Mary Immaculate (Parañaque)
- Society of the Divine Savior (Salvatorians) Father Jordan Formation House, [Amadeo, Cavite]
- Society of the Divine Savior (Salvatorians) Mater Salvatoris Theologate House, [New Manila, Quezon City]
- Pastor Bonus Seminary (Archdiocese of Zamboanga) Tetuan, Zamboanga City

=== Solomon Islands ===
- Holy Name of Mary Seminary, Tenaru, Guadalcanal Province. Inter-diocesan seminary founded in 1995.

=== Singapore ===
- St Francis Xavier Major Seminary, – founded in 1983

=== South Korea ===
At the end of the year 2011, there are 7 major seminaries in Korea; and the number of seminarians in these seven seminaries is 1,587 – from diocesan 1,317, religious & missionary 270.

- College of Theology, Catholic University of Korea – founded in 1855, currently located on the Songsin campus of Seoul; 'Songsin' means Holy Spirit in Korean.
- Department of Theology, Gwangju Catholic University, – founded in 1962, second oldest in Korea
- College of Theology, Catholic University of Daegu – founded by the Archdiocese of Daegu
- Department of Theology, Catholic University of Pusan – also running the College of Nursing
- Department of Theology, Daejeon Catholic University
- Department of Theology, Incheon Catholic University – founded in 1995, also running the College of Religious Arts
- Department of Theology, Suwon Catholic University – founded in 1982

=== Sri Lanka ===
- National Seminary of Our Lady of Lanka, Ampitiya
- St. Francis Xavier Seminary, Jaffna
- St. Paul’s Minor Seminary, Maradana
- Good Shepherd Seminary, Ratnapura

=== Taiwan ===
- Taiwan Catholic Regional Seminary – Major seminary in New Taipei City, founded in 1994, merged from St. Thomas Aquinas Seminary, Taipei (founded in 1965) and St. Pius X Seminary, Tainan (founded in 1962)
- Saint Joseph Seminary – Minor seminary for the Diocese of Hualien, founded in 1963

=== Thailand ===
There are numerous minor seminaries and one major seminary:

- Saengtham College, or Lux Mundi Major Seminary, in Sam Phran District, Nakhon Pathom Province.

=== Timor-Leste ===
- Our Lady of Fatima Minor Seminary – located in Dili
- St. Joseph Seminary – minor seminary for the Diocese of Maliana
- St. Peter and St. Paul Major Seminary – located in Dili, major seminary for the dioceses of Dili, Baucau, and Maliana

=== Vietnam ===
There are 8 major seminaries with 1,480 students in Vietnam.

- Saint Joseph Major Seminary of Hanoi – Major Seminary of the Archdiocese of Hanoi
- Vinh Thanh Major Seminary – Major Seminary in Vinh
- Saint Sulpice Major Seminary of Hue (Xuân Bích Major Seminary) – Major Seminary of the Archdiocese of Huế
- Maris Stella Major Seminary (Sao Biển Major Seminary) – Major Seminary in Nha Trang
- Saint Joseph Major Seminary of Saigon – Major Seminary of the Archdiocese of Ho Chi Minh City
- Saint Joseph Major Seminary of Xuan Loc – Major Seminary of the Diocese of Xuân Lôc
- Saint Quí Major Seminary (Thánh Quí Major Seminary) – Major Seminary in Cần Thơ
- Immaculate Conception Major Seminary Bui Chu (Đức Mẹ Vô Nhiễm Major Seminary of Bùi Chu) – Major Seminary of Diocese of Bùi Chu

And some minor seminaries:

- Sacred Heart Seminary of Thai Binh – Minor Seminary of the Diocese of Thái Bình
- Saint Nicolas Seminary of Phan Thiet – Minor Seminary of the Diocese of Phan Thiết

== Europe ==
=== Albania ===
- Albanian Pontifical Seminary, Shkodër; Jesuit

=== Austria ===
- Collegium Canisianum – International seminary run by the Jesuits, in Innsbruck
- Priesterseminar Erzdiözese Salzburg – founded in 1699; for the Archdiocese of Salzburg
- Seminary of Vienna – founded in 1758; for the Archdiocese of Wien
- Priesterseminar Leopoldinum – founded in 1967, located in Heiligenkreuz bei Baden
- Priesterseminar Graz

=== Belarus ===
- Grodno Major Seminary, Inter-diocesan seminary in Grodno, founded in 1990.
- St. Thomas Aquinas Major Seminary in Pinsk, since 2001.

=== Belgium ===
- John XXIII Seminary, Leuven – the Dutch-speaking major seminary.
- Séminaire Notre-Dame in Namur – the French-speaking major seminary.
- Redemptoris Mater Seminary Namur, International Diocesan Missionary Seminary for the Neocatechumenal Way in Namur.
- Redemptoris Mater Seminary Mechelen-Brussels, seminary for the Neocatechumenal Way in Limelette.

No longer trains seminarians:

- Major Seminary, Bruges, Bruges – closed in 2018 and students moved to Johannes XXIII Seminary in Leuven.
- St. Joseph Minor Seminary; former minor seminary of the Diocese of Ghent, now a mixed secondary school.
- Major Seminary of Ghent: major seminary of the Diocese of Ghent until 2002.
- Diocesan Seminary of Liège – moved seminarians to Namur.
- Séminaire de Tournai – Diocese of Tournai, moved seminarians to Namur.
- Séminaire Saint-Paul, in Louvain-la-Neuve – moved seminarians to Namur.
- Notre-Dame de la Strada, – formation house in Brussels for the Archdiocese of Paris.
- American College of the Immaculate Conception, Leuven – closed in 2011 by the United States Conference of Catholic Bishops.

=== Bosnia and Herzegovina ===
- Roman Catholic Archdiocese of Vrhbosna; major seminary
- Roman Catholic Archdiocese of Vrhbosna; minor seminary
- International Diocese missionary seminary Redemptoris Mater, Sarajevo; Neochatecumenal Way

=== Croatia ===
- Archdiocesan Classical Gymnasium – with minor seminary, located in Zagreb
- Greek Catholic Seminary in Zagreb
- Roman Catholic Archdiocese of Rijeka; major seminary
- Roman Catholic Archdiocese of Zagreb; major seminary
- Roman Catholic Archdiocese of Split; major seminary
- Roman Catholic Archdiocese of Đakovo-Osijek; major seminary
- International Diocese missionary seminary Redemptoris Mater, Pula; Neochatecumenal Way

=== Czech Republic ===
- Saints Cyril and Methodius Faculty of Theology, located in Olomouc (1566–1939,1945–1950,1990-now), Litoměřice (1968–1974).
- Arcibiskupský seminář v Praze Archbishops' Seminary in Prague.
- Teologická fakulta Jihočeské univerzity Seminary – since 1991, formerly centred in České Budějovice Seminary until 1950.
- Redemptoris Mater International Diocesan Missionary Seminary in České Budějovice by the Neocatechumenal Way since 2018.

=== France ===
- Diocesan Seminary of Saint-Luc d'Aix en Provence, founded by the Archdiocese of Aix.
- Séminaire de Bayonne founded by the Diocese of Bayonne, Lescar and Oloron
- Séminaire de La Castille, founded by the Diocese of Fréjus-Toulon
- Séminaire Saint-Irénée, founded by the Archdiocese of Lyon
- Grand Séminaire de Metz, which houses the Lorraine Major Inter-diocesan Seminary, founded in 1745 by the Diocese of Metz.
- Séminaire d'Orléans, inter-diocesan seminary in Orléans
- Grand séminaire Saint Jean, inter-diocesan seminary in Nantes.
- Notre Dame Faculty, also known as the Collège des Bernardins, founded in 1984 for the Archdiocese of Paris.
- Séminaire des Carmes, Institut Catholique de Paris, founded in 1919.
- Grand Séminaire Saint Sulpice, inter-diocesan seminary run by the Sulpicians in Issy-les-Moulineaux, outside Paris.
- Séminaire Saint Yves, founded by the Archdiocese of Rennes.
- Grand Séminaire Sainte Marie Majeure de Strasbourg, founded by the Archdiocese of Strasbourg
- Séminaire Saint Cyprien de Toulouse, founded by the Archdiocese of Toulouse.
- Grand séminaire de Versailles, founded by the Diocese of Versailles.
- Community of Saint Martin a training center at Évron, Mayenne.

Closed:

- Bayeux seminary, for the Diocese of Bayeux, closed in 1969.
- Grand séminaire de Besançon – for the Archdiocese of Besançon.
- St Joseph Seminary, Bordeaux, founded by the Archdiocese of Bordeaux closed in 2019.
- Saint Jean-Eudes Seminary in Caens, closed 2015.
- Lilles Seminary, for the Archdiocese of Lille, closed in 2018.
- Limoges Seminary, closed in 1958.
- Rouen Seminary, succeeded Séminaire de Saint-Vivien for the Archdiocese of Rouen.

=== Germany ===
By main Ecclesiastical Provinces:

Berlin

- Priesterseminar Berlin – for the Archdiocese of Berlin
- Priesterseminar Redemptoris Mater – Seminary of the Neocatechumenal Way in Berlin

Cologne

- Collegium Albertinum – located in Bonn; for the Archdiocese of Cologne
- Priesterseminar Köln – for the Archdiocese of Cologne
- Sankt Georgen Graduate School of Philosophy and Theology – founded in 1926 by the Jesuits, in Frankfurt am Main; notable graduates include Cardinal Friedrich Wetter
- Studienhaus St. Lambert – interdiocesan seminary, located in Lantershofen, near Bonn
- Priesterseminar Trier – for the Diocese of Trier

Freiburg im Breisgau

- Priesterseminar Collegium Borromaeum – for the Archdiocese of Freiburg
- Priesterseminar St. Bonifatius Mainz – for the Diocese of Mainz

Hamburg

- Priesterseminar Hamburg – for the Archdiocese of Hamburg

Munich und Freising

- Priesterseminar München (Priesterseminar St. Johannes der Täufer) – for the Archdiocese of Munich and Freising; founded in 1983
- Ducal Georgianum – in Munich
- Priesterseminar Regensburg (Priesterseminar St. Wolfgang Regensburg) – for the Diocese of Regensburg; founded in 1653
- Priesterseminar St. Hieronymus Augsburg – for the diocese of Augsburg
- Wigratzbad – Formally known as the International Seminary of St. Peter (ISSP; Internationales Priesterseminar St. Petrus); the headquarters of the Priestly Fraternity of St. Peter, located in Wigratzbad-Opfenbach in the Diocese of Augsburg, Bavaria

Paderborn

- Collegium Leoninum (Paderborn) – In Paderborn; founded by pope Leo XIII for the Archdiocese of Paderborn
- Priesterseminar Paderborn – for the Archdiocese of Paderborn
- Priesterseminar Erfurt – for former dioceses of the GDR: Berlin, Dresden-Meissen, Erfurt, Magdeburg and Görlitz

Other

- Collegium Orientale in Eichstätt

=== Hungary ===
- Central Institute for Priestly Education, Budapest.
- Eger College of Theology founded by the Archdiocese of Eger.
- Esztergom Seminary, originally housed in the Ószeminárium, founded by the Archdiocese of Esztergom-Budapest.
- János Brenner Theological College or Győr Theological College, founded by the Diocese of Győr.
- St. Gellert Seminary, founded by the Diocese of Szeged–Csanád.
- Blessed Gizella Seminary, housed in Archbishop's Theological College of Veszprém, founded by Archdiocese of Veszprém.
- St. Athanasius Greek Catholic Theological College founded by Hungarian Catholic Eparchy of Nyíregyháza

=== Ireland ===
The Catholic Church in Ireland encompasses the entire island of Ireland, including the distinct political entities of the Republic of Ireland and Northern Ireland. There are two active diocesan seminaries in Ireland:

- St Patrick's College, Maynooth – national seminary for Ireland, established in 1795. Capacity for 500 seminarians; there were 35 in 2018.
- Redemptoris Mater Archdiocesan Missionary Seminary, Dundalk. Seminary for the Archdiocese of Armagh run under the auspices of the Neocatechumenal Way. In 2017 it was training 16 seminarians from eight countries. Students travel to Maynooth to study philosophy and theology.

The remaining diocesan seminaries are closed:

- All Hallows College was founded in 1842 for training priests for foreign dioceses. Closed in 2015. Now DCU All Hallows Campus.
- Clonliffe College (Holy Cross College), for the Archdiocese of Dublin was founded in 1859, opened in 1861 and closed as a seminary in June 2000.
- Mungret College, Limerick, was a Limerick diocesan seminary until 1888 and a Jesuit school from 1882 until 1974.
- St Finbarr's College, Farranferris, Cork, the minor seminary for the Diocese of Cork and Ross, it later became a secondary school, closed in 2006.
- St. Brendan's College, Killarney – secondary school founded in 1860 which also prepared seminarians for the priesthood.
- St. Finian's College was founded in Navan as the Meath Diocesan College in 1802, moved to Mullingar in 1908, It is now a co-ed secondary school.
- St. John's College, Waterford, founded in 1807, was exclusively for seminarians of the Waterford and Lismore Diocese from 1873 until June 1999.
- St Kieran's College, Kilkenny, was founded in 1782, priestly formation was discontinued in 1994.
- St Malachy's College, Belfast, founded in 1833 for the Diocese of Down and Connor, closed in 2018.
- St. Patrick's, Carlow College was founded in 1782, opened in 1793. From 1892 it was only a seminary. Closed in the 1990s.
- St. Patrick's College, Thurles opened in 1837, exclusively a seminary from 1907 to 1988, ceased to function as a seminary in 2002.
- St Peter's College, Wexford was founded in 1811, seminary closed in 1999.
- St Vincent's Seminary, Cork once trained priests, later became a secondary school.

Religious congregations also had houses of formation in Ireland:

- Franciscan Novitiate, Killarney, County Kerry. Built in 1860, students were then sent to St. Anthony's in Galway.
- St. Saviour’s Priory, Dublin, the Dominicans moved their studium from St. Mary's Priory in Tallaght, in 2000, students complete their studies in Rome.
- St Anthony's College, Newcastle, Galway. Former Franciscan seminary, buildings now used by NUI Galway.
- Belmont House, Stillorgan, Dublin. Novitiate of the Oblates, founded near Glenmary, near Delgany in County Wicklow, moved in 1863.
- Belcamp Hall, Raheny, Dublin, was the juniorate of the Missionary Oblates of Mary Immaculate.
- Bessborough House Oblates Our Lady's Scholasticate in Piltown, County Kilkenny, from 1941 to 1971. Building now used as Kildalton Agricultural College.
- Our Lady of Lourdes, Cahermoyle, Ardagh, County Limerick, Oblate junior novitiate
- Moyne Park, Abbeyknocknoy, Ballyglunin, County Galway, in 1909 opened as a Camillian hospice, a seminary for the Missionaries of the Sacred Heart in 1936, closed in the early 1970s.
- Dalgan House, Shrule, County Mayo. Built in 1801, bought by the Duke of Bedford in 1853, a seminary for the Columbans from 1918 to 1941. Now demolished.
- St Columbans College, Dalgan Park, Navan, was the seminary of the Columbans after 1941.
- St Patrick's, Donamon Castle, County Roscommon. Novitiate of the Divine Word Missionaries, opened 1939, closed in 1980.
- Kilshane, County Tipperary. Novitiate of Holy Ghost Fathers (the Spiritians), was purchased in August 1933 and opened as a Novitiate for both clerics and brothers.
- Holy Ghost Missionary College, Kimmage Manor, Dublin. Formation house of the Holy Ghost Fathers (the Spiritians) for those going on to Kilshane.
- Legion of Christ Novitiate, Leopardstown Road, Foxrock, Dublin. In April 1960, it opened in Bundoran, County Donegal. On 3 June 1962, it moved to Hazelbrook House, Malahide, to Foxrock in 1968 and closed in September 2011.
- Kinury, near Westport, County Mayo, was given to the Society of African Missions (SMA) in 1914 by Miss Sofia Crotty. It was used as a novitiate and closed in 1924.
- Cloghballymore House, Ballinderreen, Kilcolgan, County Galway, was a tower house, then a country estate. In 1906, Count Llewellyn Blake gave it to the Society of the African Missions. It was their novitiate from 1924 until the mid 1970s. Been a nursing home since 1981.
- Ballinafad Minor Seminary was also given by Count Llewellyn Blake to the Society of the African Missions, operated until 1975 and was linked to Cloghballymore House.
- St Joseph's Seminary, Blackrock Rd, Cork. The original seminary of the Society of the African Missions, later transferred to Dromantine House.
- Dromantine House, Newry, County Down, was a seminary of the Society of the African Missions from 1926 until 1972.
- St Augustine's College (Loughan House), Blacklion, County Cavan. Novitiate of the White Fathers from September 1955 and closed in 1970.
- The Abbey, Loughrea, County Galway. Since 1645, a Discalced Carmelites community, trained novices since 1664. In 1882, a new novitiate was constructed, and extended in 1934. The novitiate is closed, but a community remains.
- Castlemartyr, County Cork, in 1930, had a Discalced Carmelite juniorate. It closed in 1996 and is now a hotel.
- Loughrea, County Galway, contained a novitiate of the De La Salle Brothers, which was active into the 1980s.
- St Stanislaus College, Tullabeg, Tullamore. This was the novitiate of the Jesuits in Ireland until the move to Emo Court in 1930.
- St Mary's, Emo Court. Novitiate for the Society of Jesus in Ireland from 1930 to 1969.
- Manresa House, Dollymount, Dublin. After Emo Court, it was novitiate of the Irish Jesuits from 1969 to 1991.
- Milltown Institute of Theology and Philosophy formed out of the Jesuit Theology Faculty.
- St Patrick's, Esker, Athenry, County Galway. Established on 18 August 1901 was the Redemptorist Irish Province major seminary until 1836. From 1948 until 1969 it was the novitiate. In 1971, it became a retreat house.
- Cluain Mhuire, Galway, was a Redemptorist seminary, closed in the 1970s. It is now the GMIT Art College.
- Pallotine College Thurles, County Tipperary. Founded by the Pallotines in 1907, from 1909 to 1986 priests from the college studied at nearby St. Patrick's College, Thurles.
- St Gabriel's, The Graan, Enniskillen, County Fermanagh. Novitiate of the Passionists, 1909–1976, is now a nursing home, with the community remaining.
- Tobar Mhuire, Crossgar, County Down, (formerly Crossgar House). From 1950 until 1976, was the Passionist Juniorate, then a novitiate and a Retreat and Conference Centre as of February 2010.
- St Paul's Retreat, Mount Argus, Dublin, was the Irish Passionist headquarters, and provided the final two years of formation for Passionist seminarians.
- Tanagh, Cootehill, County Cavan. Former Congregation of the Sacred Hearts of Jesus and Mary novitiate and seminary, now an outdoor education centre, and religious community remain.
- Mount St Marys, Milltown, Dublin. Seminary of the Marist Fathers. The site is now a Montessori College and the Irish Marist administrative headquarters.
- Orlagh, Knocklyon, County Dublin. Opened as a novitiate for the Augustinians, was a student house until the late 1980s, when it became a retreat centre, closed in 2016
- Carmelite Friary, Kinsale, County Cork. Became a novitiate for the Irish Province of the Carmelites in 1917, moving to the existing Friary from Dublin in 1917. In 2003, due to dwindling numbers of novices, it was re-purposed as a Retreat and Spirituality Centre.
- Carmelite Centre, Gort Mhuire, Ballinteer, County Dublin. From 1949, Gort Mhuire was the novitiate and the theologate for the Carmelites, in 1968 Carmelites began studying theology in Milltown Park as the Institute was being set up there. Now the Carmelite Institute of Britain and Ireland is based here.
- St. Joseph's, Blackrock, was the seminary for the Vincentians, was founded in 1930, St. Kevins, House of Studies/Seminary, Glenart, Arklow, operated from 1948 to 1968, when students were transferred back to Blackrock in 1977, until the setting up of DePaul House, Celbridge operated from 1977 to 1988.
- Myross Woods, Leap, County Cork, was the novitate of the Missionaries of the Sacred Heart. Converted to a retreat centre in the 1970s, it closed in 2021.
- St. Patricks Missionary College – High Park, Kiltegan, County Wicklow, Saint Patrick's Society for the Foreign Missions (Kiltegan Fathers), opened in 1932, students would take degrees from University College Cork, in 2015 transferred headquarters to Kenya.

=== Italy ===
The list includes some seminaries by principal Ecclesiastical Provinces.

Benevento

- Seminario Arcivescovile di Benevento – founded in 1567; for the Archdiocese of Benevento, closed in 2018, students transferred to the Pontifical Campanian Interregional Seminary.

Catania

- Seminary of Acireale – founded in 1881; for the Diocese of Acireale, in Sicily

Florence

- Diocesan Seminary of Fiesole – founded in 1637 for the Diocese of Fiesole
- Institute of Christ the King Sovereign Priest – founded in 1990; international seminary located in Gricigliano, near Florence
- Seminario Maggiore Arcivescovile di Firenze – founded in 1712; for the Archdiocese of Florence
- Seminario Vescovile di Pistoia – founded in 1783; for the Diocese of Pistoia
- Seminario vescovile di San Miniato – for the Diocese of San Miniato

Genoa

- Seminario Arcivescovile di Genova – founded in 1962; for the Archdiocese of Genoa
- Seminario Vescovile di Savona – for the Diocese of Savona

Lecce

- Seminario Arcivescovile di Brindisi – founded in 1720; for the Archdiocese of Brindisi, closed in 2017.

Messina

- Seminario vescovile di Patti – for the Diocese of Patti

Milan

- Seminario vescovile di Bergamo
- Seminario arcivescovile di Milano – founded in 1564; for the Archdiocese of Milan
- Seminario Diocesano di Pavia – founded in 1799; for the Diocese of Pavia
- Seminario maggiore di Como – for the Diocese of Como

Naples

- San Luigi Papal Theological Seminary of Southern Italy (Pontificia Facoltà Teologica dell'Italia Meridionale; PFTIM) – located in Naples
- Seminario Arcivescovile di Napoli – founded in 1930; for the Archdiocese of Naples

Pisa

- Seminario Girolamo Gavi – founded in 1851; for the Diocese of Livorno

Rome

- Pontificio Collegio Leoniano – founded in 1897, located in Anagni
- Pontificio Collegio Nepomuceno – founded in 1884, located in Rome
- Pontifical North American College – founded in 1859, located in Rome; the North American College was granted pontifical status placing it under the special patronage of the Apostolic See and the care of the Pope. The college, therefore, is the direct concern of the Congregation for Catholic Education and is under the immediate supervision of the United States Conference of Catholic Bishops.
- Pontifical Roman Seminary (Pontificio Seminario Romano Maggiore) – founded in 1565, located at the Basilica of St. John Lateran in Rome
- Seminario della Fraternità Sacerdotale dei Missionari di San Carlo Borromeo – founded in the 20th century
- The Center for Higher Studies – run by the Legion of Christ for its own members.
- The Venerable English college – founded in 1579 by Pope Gregory XIII and William Cardinal Allen with the desire to send priests back to minister to Catholics in England after the reformation
- The Pontifical Scots College – founded 5 December 1600 by Pope Clement VIII.
- Pontifical Irish College

Salerno-Campagna-Acerno

- Seminario Vescovile di Teggiano – founded in 1564; for the Roman Catholic Diocese of Teggiano-Policastro

Taranto

- Seminario Arcivescovile di Taranto – founded in 1568; for the Archdiocese of Taranto

Torino

- Seminario Vescovile di Asti – founded in 1574; for the Diocese of Asti

Venice

- Seminario maggiore di Padova – founded in 1566; for the Diocese of Padua
- Seminario vescovile (Vicenza) – founded in 1566; for the Diocese of Vicenza

=== Latvia ===
- Rīgas Katoļu garīgais seminārs – Latvian Inter-Diocesan Theological Seminary in Riga.

=== Lithuania ===
- Kaunas Priest Seminary – The largest seminary in Lithuania serving the Roman Catholic Archdiocese of Kaunas
- Telsiai Bishop Vincentas Borisevicius Priest Seminary – Located in Telšiai
- Vilnius St. Joseph Seminary – For the dioceses of Vilnius, Panevėžys and Kaišiadorys.

=== Luxembourg ===
- Grand Séminaire de Luxembourg – Founded in 1845; for the Archdiocese of Luxembourg

=== Netherlands ===
Many serve as residences for courses that take place elsewhere:

- Ariëns Institute (Het Ariënsinstituut) in the centre of Utrecht, run by the Archdiocese of Utrecht.
- Rolduc in Kerkrade of the southeastern Netherlands; run by the Diocese of Roermond
- St Willibrord Seminary, De Tiltenberg, run by the Diocese of Haarlem-Amsterdam
- St John's Centre (Sint-Janscentrum) run by the Diocese of 's-Hertogenbosch
- Bovendonk Seminary, for part-time study and later vocations, run by the Diocese of Breda
- Vronesteyn Seminary in Voorburg, run by the Diocese of Rotterdam.
- Redemptoris Mater Haarlem-Amsterdam, International Diocesan Missionary Major Seminary, in Nieuwe Niedorp for the Neocatechumenal Way
- Redemptoris Mater Seminary near Huis Blankenberg in Cadier en Keer, for the Neocatechumenal Way.

=== Norway ===
- St. Eystein presteseminar, Oslo – Established 1 March 2006. For the Roman Catholic Diocese of Oslo.

=== Poland ===
- Metropolitan Higher Seminary in Olsztyn – for the Archdiocese of Warmia
- Metropolitan Higher Seminary in Warsaw – for the Archdiocese of Warsaw
- Higher Seminary of Our Lady Victorious Diocese of Warszawa-Praga – for the Roman Catholic Diocese of Warszawa-Praga
- Wyższe Seminarium Duchowne Archidiecezji Częstochowskiej – for the Archdiocese of Częstochowa
- Prymasowskie Wyższe Seminarium Duchowne w Gnieźnie – founded in 1583; for the Archdiocese of Gniezno
- Wyższe Seminarium Duchowne w Katowicech – founded in 1924; for the Archdiocese of Katowice
- Wyższe Seminarium Duchowne Archidiecezji Krakowskiej – founded in 1601; for the Archdiocese of Kraków
- Wyższe Seminarium Duchowne w Łodzi – founded in 1921; for the Archdiocese of Łódź
- Metropolitalne Seminarium Duchowne w Lublinie – for the Archdiocese of Lublin
- Wyższe Seminarium Duchowne w Opolu – founded in 1949; for the Roman Catholic Diocese of Opole and Roman Catholic Diocese of Gliwice
- Arcybiskupie Seminarium Duchowne w Poznaniu – founded in 1564; for the Archdiocese of Poznań
- Metropolitalne Wyższe Seminarium Duchowne we Wrocławiu – founded in 1947; for the Archdiocese of Wroclaw
- Wyższe Seminarium Duchowne w Paradyżu – founded in 1952; for the Roman Catholic Diocese of Zielona Góra-Gorzów

=== Portugal ===
- Seminário dos Passionistas – located in Barroselas of northern Portugal
- Seminário de Santa Joana Princesa – for the diocese of Aveiro
- Seminário Conciliar de São Pedro e São Paulo – for the Archdiocese of Braga
- Seminário dos Olivais – founded in 1931; for the Archdiocese of Lisbon
- Seminário de Caparide – for the Archdiocese of Lisbon
- Seminário Maior do Porto – for the diocese of Porto
- Seminário de São José de Vila Viçosa – for the Archdiocese of Évora
- Seminário Episcopal de Angra – for the diocese of Angra do Heroismo, Azores

=== Romania ===
- Seminary of the Wisdom Incarnate in Alba Iulia, founded in 1753, serving the Archdiocese of Alba Iulia and the Dioceses of Satu Mare, Oradea and Timişoara.
- Seminary of St. Joseph in Iaşi, founded in 1886, for the Diocese of Iaşi and the Archdiocese of Bucharest.

=== Russia ===
- Saint Petersburg Roman Catholic Theological Academy – Mary Queen of the Apostles Seminary in St. Petersburg

=== Slovakia ===
- Kňazský seminár sv. Cyrila a Metoda in Bratislava – for the Archdiocese of Bratislava and Archdiocese of Trnava
- Kňazský seminár sv. Gorazda in Nitra – for the Diocese of Nitra and the Diocese of Žilina
- Kňazský seminár biskupa Jána Vojtaššáka in Spišská Kapitula – for the Diocese of Spiš
- Kňazský seminár sv. Karola Boromejského in Košice – for the Archdiocese of Košice and the Diocese of Rožňava
- Gréckokatolícky kňazský seminár blahoslaveného biskupa Pavla Petra Gojdiča in Prešov – for the Slovak Greek Catholic Church

Closed:

- Kňazský seminár sv. Františka Xaverského in Badín – for the Diocese of Banská Bystrica, until 2019, seminarians moved to Nitra.

=== Slovenia ===
- Theological Seminary of Ljubljana – known for Semenišče; famous for beautiful baroque style library, near Ljubljana cathedral

=== Spain ===
Spain has 77 seminaries.

- Asidonia-Jerez Seminary – for the Asidonia-Jerez Diocese
- Seminari Conciliar de Barcelona – for the Archdiocese of Barcelona
- Seminario de Málaga – for the Diocese of Málaga
- Seminario Mayor San José – for the Archdiocese of Burgos
- Seminario Mayor Metropolitano del San Cecilio – for the Archdiocese of Granada
- Seminario Conciliar de la INMACULADA Y SAN DAMASO – for the Archdiocese of Madrid
- Seminario Mayor Nuestra Señora de la Asuncion – for the Archdiocese of Oviedo
- Seminario Mayor Compostelano – for the Archdiocese of Santiago de Compostela
- Royal Scots College – Seminary in Salamanca, for the church in Scotland
- Seminario Metropolitano de Sevilla – for the Archdiocese of Seville
- Seminario Mayor San Ildefonso – for the Archdiocese of Toledo
- Seminario Metropolitano de Valencia – for the Archdiocese of Valencia
- English College, Valladolid (Real y Pontifico Colegio de los Nobles Ingleses de San Albano) – for the Church in England and Wales, currently providing propadeutic formation
- Seminario Mayor San Valero y San Braulio – for the Archdiocese of Zaragoza
- Seminario de Valderas (León) – for the Diocese of León
- Seminari Major Interdiocesà de Catalunya. Barcelona, Spain

=== Sweden ===
- Sankt Sigfrids prästseminarium, Uppsala

=== Switzerland ===
- Priesterseminar St. Beat, founded by the Diocese of Basel, in Lucerne.
- Priesterseminar St. Luzi – affiliated with the Theologische Hochschule Chur, for the Diocese of Chur.
- Séminaire de Sion, for the Diocese of Sion, in Givisiez, Fribourg.
- Séminaire diocésain de Lausanne, Genève et Fribourg for the Diocese of Lausanne, Geneva and Fribourg, in Villars-sur-Glâne, Fribourg.
- Seminario Diocesano San Carlo, founded by the Diocese of Lugano.

=== Ukraine ===
- Kyiv Theological Seminary of the Three Holy Hierarchs - The seminary for the Kyiv Archeparchy and the eastern exarchates of Ukraine.
- Lviv Theological Seminary of the Holy Spirit — Formed the basis of the Ukrainian Catholic University and remains the associated seminary.
- Ivano-Frankivsk Theological Academy of Greek-Catholic Church

=== United Kingdom ===
The current active major seminaries of the United Kingdom are in England.

England

- St Mary's College, Oscott – The seminary of the Province of Birmingham.
- Allen Hall Seminary, London – The seminary of the Province of Westminster.
- Redemptoris Mater House of Formation, London – situated close to Allen Hall, for the Neocatechumenal Way.

Closed:

- Campion House, Osterley, seminary for late vocations run by the Society of Jesus
- Cotton College, minor seminary for Oscott College
- St John's Seminary, Wonersh, seminary of the Province of Southwark, closed in 2021.
- St Joseph Seminary, Mark Cross, minor seminary for St John's Seminary, Wonersh
- St Hugh's College, Tollerton, minor seminary for the Diocese of Nottingham
- St Joseph's College, Upholland, seminary for the North West of England
- Ushaw College, Durham, seminary for the Province of Liverpool, closed in 2011
- St Edmund's College, Ware, predecessor of Allen Hall

Scotland

- Aquhorthies College, seminary for the Lowland District, replaced Scalan College merged with Lismore seminary to form Blairs College in 1829
- Blairs College, closed in 1986
- Gillis College, replaced St Andrew's College, Drygrange in 1986, replaced by Scotus College in 1993
- Lismore Seminary, for the Highland District, merged with Aquhorthies College to form Blair College in 1829
- Scalan College, from 1717 to 1799, for the Lowland District, replaced by Aquhorthies College
- Scotus College, became the National Seminary for Scotland in 1993, closed in 2009.
- St Andrew's College, Drygrange, closed in 1986
- St Peter's College, Bearsden, for the Archdiocese of Glasgow from 1874 to 1946 when it burnt down in a fire
- St Peter's Seminary, Cardross, replaced St Peter's College, Bearsden, closed in 1980.
- St Vincent College, Langbank, a minor seminary from 1961 to 1978.

Wales

- St Mary's College, Aberystwyth, originally in Holywell, moved to Aberystwyth in 1936, closed in 1970, for Welsh-speaking training, run by the Carmelites

== See also ==
- List of Eastern Catholic seminaries
- Pontifical university
