= List of Eastern Catholic seminaries =

This is a list of Eastern Catholic seminaries, which prepare candidates for the priesthood.

== Alexandrian liturgical tradition ==
=== Egypt ===
- (Coptic) St. Leo’s Patriarchal Seminary in Maadi (1953), a suburb of Cairo

=== Eritrea ===
- (Eritrean) Seminary in Asmara, Eritrea
- (Eritrean) Seminary in Keren, Eritrea

=== Ethiopia ===
- (Ethiopian) Capuchin Franciscan Institute of Philosophy and Theology in Addis Ababa, Ethiopia
- (Ethiopian) Seminary in Adigrat, Ethiopia

=== Italy ===
- (Ethiopian) Pontifical Ethiopian College in Rome

== Antiochian (Antiochene or West-Syriac) liturgical tradition ==
=== Italy ===
- (Maronite) Pontifical Maronite College (1584, reopened in 2001) in Rome

=== Lebanon ===
- (Maronite) Seminary of St. Antoine
- (Maronite) Maronite Patriarchal Seminary at Ghazir
- (Maronite) diocesan seminary at Karem Saddeh, near Tripoli in northern Lebanon
- The Holy Spirit University of Kaslik in Lebanon provides advanced theological education for the Maronite church
- (Syriac) Al-Charfet Patriarchal Seminary

=== India ===
- (Syro-Malankara) St. Mary’s Malankara Major Seminary (1983) at Trivandrum

=== United States ===
- (Maronite) Our Lady of Lebanon Seminary in Washington, D.C.
- Gregorios Malankara Syrian Catholic Seminary, New York

== Armenian liturgical tradition ==
=== Armenia ===
- Holy Archangels Junior Seminary, Gyumri

=== Italy ===
- Collegio Armeno in Rome

=== Lebanon ===
- Bzoummar Seminary in Bzoummar
- Mechitarist Fathers Seminary in Bikfaya

== Chaldean or East Syriac liturgical tradition ==
=== India ===
- Malpan Seminary with University status in Kottapuram/ Pallipuram Established by Patriarch of Church of The East in AD 450 for Malabar, later seminary was shifted to Mananam and dissolved in St.Joseph's Seminary of Syro - Malabar Church CMI fathers
- Syro-Malabar St. Joseph's Pontifical Seminary (Mangalapuzha Seminary) in Mangalapuzha, Aluva
- Syro-Malabar St. Thomas Apostolic Seminary in Vadavathoor
- Syro-Malabar Good Shepherd Major Seminary in Kunnoth, Tellicherry
- Syro-Malabar St. Ephrem Major Seminary for Missions, Satna
- Syro-Malabar Mary Matha Major Seminary, Thrissur

=== Iraq ===
- (Chaldean) St. Peter Seminary for Chaldean Patriarchate in Iraq. http://chaldeanseminary.com/

=== United States ===
- (Chaldean) The Seminary of Mar Abba the Great in San Diego

== Byzantine (Constantinopolitan) liturgical tradition ==
=== Austria ===
- ITI Catholic University

=== Brazil ===
- (Ukrainian) Greek Catholic Seminary in Curitiba

=== Canada ===
- (Ukrainian) Holy Spirit Seminary of Ukrainian Greek Catholic Church, Edmonton, Alberta
- (Ukrainian) Metropolitan Andrey Sheptytsky Institute of Eastern Christian Studies of St. Michael's College, Toronto, Ontario

=== Croatia ===
- Greek Catholic Seminary in Zagreb (1681)

=== Germany ===
- Collegium Orientale in Eichstätt

=== Hungary ===
- Saint Athanasius Greek Catholic College of Theology and Seminary in Nyíregyháza

=== Palestine ===
- (Melkite) St. Anne’s Seminary in Jerusalem, under the direction of the White Fathers (Missionaries of Africa), closed
- (Melkite) Holy Savior Seminary in Beit Sahour, Palestine, for dioceses in Israel, Jordan, and Palestine

=== Italy ===
- Ukrainian Pontifical College of Saint Josaphat (1897)
- Pontifical Ukrainian College of the Protection of our Lady in Rome (closed)
- Pontifical Greek College of Saint Athanasius (Pontificio Collegio Greco) in Rome
- Collegium Russicum (Pontificio Collegio Russo) (1929) in Rome
- Romanian Pontifical College (“Pio Romeno”) in Rome
- Pontifical Oriental Institute, Rome

=== Lebanon ===
- (Melkite) Patriarchal Seminary of St. Anne in Raboueh, Antelias, Lebanon

=== Romania ===
- Greek Catholic Theological Faculty at the Babeș-Bolyai University in Cluj-Napoca

=== Slovakia ===
- (Slovak) Byzantine Catholic Seminary of Pavol Peter Gojdič in Prešov

=== United States ===
- (Ruthenian/Melkite) Byzantine Catholic Seminary of SS. Cyril and Methodius of (Ruthenian) Byzantine Catholic Church Pittsburgh, PA
- (Ukrainian) St. Basil College Seminary, of Ukrainian Catholic Eparchy of Stamford
- (Ukrainian) Saint Josaphat Seminary, Washington, DC

=== Ukraine ===
- Ukrainian Catholic University in Lviv
- Holy Spirit Seminary of Ukrainian Greek Catholic Church, Lviv
- Greek Catholic Seminary in Uzhhorod (1995)
- Seminary of Blessed Martyrs Severyn, Yakym and Vitalij of Ukrainian Greek Catholic Church, in Drohobych
- Ivano-Frankivsk Theological Academy of Greek-Catholic Church
- Greek Catholic Seminary in Ternopil
- Kyiv Theological Seminary of the Three Holy Hierarchs

== See also ==
- List of Catholic seminaries
