= Piyan =

Piyan (Persian: پيان) may refer to:

- Pian-e Olya
- Pian-e Sofla
- Pian Rural District
