= Pope Paul VI Minor Seminary =

Roman Catholic seminary in Southern Leyte, Philippines

Coordinates: 10°07′45″N 124°51′53″E

Pope Paul VI Minor Seminary is a diocesan seminary run by the Diocese of Maasin, in Maasin, Southern Leyte, Philippines. It was established in 1970 by the Most Rev. Vicente T. Ataviado, DD (1968-1997) the year Pope Paul VI made a papal visit to the Philippines. and two years after his arrival as the first Bishop of the newly created diocese (1968).

== The Foundation ==
Bishop Ataviado with meager funds started laying the foundation of a formation house of his future collaborators, the priests, in 1970. He at first housed the young seminarians at his own newly constructed Bishop's residence where they were trained in all aspects of life necessary to become effective and faithful servants of the Lord in the future. While Latin was taught inside the seminary, other subjects were and until now are being taught in the diocesan school, St. Joseph College.

== Formation ==
The first rector of the seminary was Fr. Vicente Lora (d.2004)who was assigned before the creation of the new diocese in the Sacred Heart Seminary, Palo, Leyte. Fr. Lora came from San Rafael, Maasin, Southern Leyte. When Fr. Lora left for a parish assignment in 1972, Fr. Arfeo Sescon took over the challenge of forming young men amid the political and social upheavals in the capital, Manila where he was trained for the priesthood under the guidance of the Dominican Fathers of the University of Santo Tomas Central Seminary. Helping him to run the whole seminary affairs was Rev. Fr. Felix Paloma who took the initiative of improving the seminary facilities to attract more young men to the seminary. With the increasing demand of having new parish priest appointed in different parts of the diocese, seminary formators would not last for more than two or three years. It happened indeed the year after Fr. Amado Olayvar left the seminary in 1977 for a parish assignment that the Bishop himself took the cudgel in running the seminary simply because he did not have any priest available for the seminary. His priests were all in the parishes. However, the Bishop put a major seminarian on regency in charge of the daily activities and schedule of the seminary. On their regency years, Wilson de los Reyes, Santos Sabondo, Celso Moreno, Romeo Mangyao, and Leonardo Kilat were one time assigned and stayed in the seminary. This arrangement with non-clerics as resident-formators lasted for how many years until in 1982 when the diocese started to reap the first fruits of Pope Paul VI Minor Seminary. It was this year that Bishop Ataviado did the first ordination to the priesthood of those coming from this minor seminary.

The first alumnus to be assigned as rector of the seminary in 1982-1983 was Rev. Fr. Adelfo Briones. His term was marked by a reform of seminary policies and discipline. But when a new parish asked for his pastoral care and presence, Fr. Adelfo Briones did not hesitate to accept the challenge. The seminary once again left orphaned until the ordination of Rev. Fr. Anastacio Lito Narit who stayed in the seminary from 1983 to 1986. Although his term was beset with all kinds of problems due also to the political, social, and economic conditions of the time, the seminary had survived because of the austere life adopted by the formators and the seminarians.

After the EDSA Revolution, a new and energetic priest set a new direction of the minor seminary. But Rev. Fr. Rogelio Lumbre's vision for the seminary suddenly deadened when he was assigned a few months later to a parish. Msgr. Amado Olayvar, fresh from Rome, rescued the sad state of the minor seminary. It was this time that extension building for the pre-college formation was almost complete. The seminary came back to life again with the iron hand of the prefect discipline of Romeo Mangyao and followed by Leonardo Kilat. In 1989, Fr. Nicolas Lagumbay came and transformed the seminary almost like a home conducive for community living and learning. It's during his term that produced later a lot of priests presently serving the diocese. This happy atmosphere would not last long without the efforts of the next Rector in 1992–94. Fr. Eufemio Gohetia raised funds to keep the seminary building looking new and the roofs re-structured to withstand the merciless downpour during rainy seasons. Fr. Leopoldo Suarez, Jr. in 1994-1995 gave the seminarians a good liturgical orientation while still in the formation. His term was cut short because a parish was suddenly left with no one to take care of. Thus, while still a deacon, Rev. Dennis Cagantas began running the seminary with much "responsible-freedom" given to seminarians until 1996. His term was again cut short when Bishop Ataviado got sick and was hospitalized for many months in Manila. Since he was the Private Secretary of the Bishop, he had no choice but to be with the Bishop. So, Fr. Plutarco Rodriguez was assigned to take care of the seminary from 1997 to 1999. It was during his term that there were liturgical innovations being done in the seminary activities.

When the new Bishop came to take possession of the diocese after the death of Bishop Ataviado, Fr. Roel Handayan became the rector. The new Bishop Precioso Cantillas never lost time in getting closer to the diocesan seminary, the apple of his eye, as canonists put it. Being an administrator himself in the past, Bishop Cantillas devised plans to improve the quality of formation of his minor seminarians. Thus, starting this time, seminarians were never that more closely monitored in their development as young men and as future priests. The upkeep of the seminary personnel was never taken for granted by him. In fact, immediately a few weeks after his arrival, he already floated the idea of constructing a new seminary building to house not only minor seminarians but also college seminarians.

The handbook of the minor seminary started to be formed during the term of Rev. Fr. Oscar A. Cadayona. The admission procedures were reviewed and standardized. The devotion to the Holy Mass and to the Blessed Virgin Mary marked the liturgical and spiritual life of the seminarians. The periodic outing to woods or mountains or seas fostered camaraderie of future priests or future public servants. The resident spiritual director, Fr. Angelito Rosales, made a lot of difference to the seminarians' sense of personal belongingness to Jesus Christ. The number of seminarians at this time increased every year until Fr. Cadayona left for Rome for post-graduate studies in philosophy in 2005. At present, the minor seminary is run by Rev. Msgr. Marnito Bansig. now the new rector is joy luzon.

== Rectors ==
- Fr. Vicente Lora (1970)
- Fr. Arfeo Sescon (1972)
- Fr. Felix Paloma (1974)
- Fr.Amado Olayvar (1975)
- Bishop Vicente Ataviado (1978)
- Fr. Adelfo Briones (1982)
- Fr. Anastacio Lito Narit (1984)
- Fr. Roger Lumbre (1986)
- Msgr. Amado Olayvar (1987)
- Fr. Nicolas Lagumbay (1989)
- Fr. Eufemio Gohetia (1992)
- Fr. Leopoldo Suarez (1994)
- Fr. Dennis Cagantas (1995)
- Fr. Plutarco Rodriguez (1997)
- Fr. Roel Handayan (1999)
- Fr. Oscar Cadayona (2001)
- Msgr. Marnito Bansig (2005–2011)
- Fr. Johnrey B. Sibi (2011–2016)
- Fr. Giovanni Luzon (2016–Present)

== See also ==
- List of Roman Catholic seminaries
