= Benoit XVI Interdiocesan Major Seminary =

The Benedict XVI Interdiocesan Major Seminary (French: Grand séminaire interdiocésain Benoît XVI) is a Roman Catholic seminary in Tchitchao, near Kara in Togo.

== Rectors ==
2016 - Timothée Kpenu
