= Sancta Maria, Mater et Regina, Seminarium =

Roman Catholic seminary in Capiz, Philippines

- Latin: Sancta Maria, Mater et Regina, Seminarium
- Former names: St. Pius X Seminary - Cagay Campus
- Motto: Caritas et Prudentia
- Type: Private Seminary
- Established: 1999
- Affiliations: Archdiocese of Capiz
- Rector: Rev. Fr. John Carl R. Robles
- Location: Cagay, Roxas City, Capiz, Philippines; 11°34′20″N 122°42′56″E
- Campus: Suburban
- Colors: White blue
- Nickname: Mariani

Sancta Maria, Mater et Regina, Seminarium (Saint Mary, Mother and Queen, Seminary), formerly St. Pius X Seminary - Cagay Campus, is a major seminary of the Archdiocese of Capiz, Philippines and one of the schools in Capiz. It is home to the archdiocese's philosophy and theology seminarians. SMMRS was founded by the former archbishop of Capiz, Onesimo C. Gordoncillo, D.D.

== History ==
The Sancta Maria Mater et Regina Seminarium (SMMRS) can truly trace its roots back to St. Pius X Seminary. The late archbishop of Capiz, Most Rev. Antonio F. Frondosa, D.D., had explicitly expressed his intention to build another seminary aside from St. Pius X Seminary. It was in the late 1970s when Mr. Catalino A. Mabasa Jr. wrote a letter to Fr. Daniel M. Viloria, then rector of St. Pius X Seminary, offering his land property in Sitio Bang-bang, Brgy. Cagay, Roxas City as site for the new seminary to be built. Fr. Viloria referred the said letter to Archbishop Frondosa. The archbishop, however, refused the proposed site since it would be very difficult to supervise two seminaries that are far away from each other. The archbishop preferred that the major seminary be a stone’s throw away from St. Pius X Seminary.

When the Most Rev. Onesimo C. Gordoncillo, D.D., took over the administration of the archdiocese in 1986, he followed up his predecessor’s plan of building a new seminary. In 1993, the Congregation for Catholic Education in Rome upon recommendation of the apostolic visitators advised Archbishop Gordoncillo to separate the major seminarians from the minor seminarians. Without second thoughts, the good archbishop decided to construct a new seminary. He requested Msgr. Bonifacio D. Baldonado, then Oeconomus of Capiz, to look for an appropriate site for the new seminary. Msgr. Baldonado recommended Mr. Mabasa’s standing offer. Upon the recommendation of Msgr. Baldonado and Antonio F. Arinquin who visited the site, Archbishop Gordoncillo accepted Mr. Mabasa’s offer.

In 1995 the project to build the new seminary was formally launched in a Mass presided over by Jaime Cardinal L. Sin at Villa San Miguel, Mandaluyong. Mr. Francisco Alba donated a sizeable amount and spearheaded a fundraising campaign in Manila for the said project. With the approval of the Holy See, the cornerstone of the envisioned seminary was laid on December 27, 1996. A construction committee was formed for the building of the new seminary, then estimated to cost 48 to 51 million pesos, with Mother Mary Thomas Del Rosario, O.P. as project engineer, Ramon Teruel as architect, Msgr. Bonifacio D. Baldonado as finance officer and Mr. Celestino Auxtero as liaison officer.

On July 14, 1999, the seminary was formally opened under the name of St. Pius X Seminary (SPXS), Cagay Campus, pending its registration with the Securities and Exchange Commission. On the same date, college seminarians left SPXS; the day henceforth was called “Exodus.” It is commemorated annually to remind everyone of the historic departure from Lawaan to Cagay. Msgr. Vicente F. Hilata, P.A., then vicar general, presided over the opening Eucharistic celebration with twelve priests as concelebrants.

The pioneers of the newly established seminary comprised fifty seminarians and four priest-formators in residence: Jose F. Advincula Jr., first rector (now Archbishop of Manila); Digno V. Jore, vice-rector and procurator; John Michael V. Asis, dean of studies; and Alston V. Azarcon, spiritual director.

In the summer of 2001, the Holy See granted the request of the Archdiocese of Capiz to open the Theology Department, under the administration of Victor B. Bendico, second rector (May 2000 - November 2007). On June 25, 2001, the Theology Department was formally opened with three first-year enrollees, namely: Vivencio Besa Jr., John D. Denosta, and Joey D. Javier. That same year the seminary was officially registered in the Security and Exchange Commission (SEC) as SANCTA MARIA MATER ET REGINA SEMINARIUM.

In November 2007, Fr. Regie A. Pamposa was installed as the third rector of SMMRS (November 2007 – May 2014). Under the leadership of Fr. Pamposa, the seminary building was painted and further beautified. With the constant support and love of the seminary benefactors here and abroad, the seminary chapel was finally constructed and blessed on February 14, 2010 by Most Rev. Edward Joseph Adams, D.D., then papal nuncio to the Philippines.

On July 11, 2014, Fr. Joseph Bernie A. Barrios became the fourth rector of SMMRS. To date, the seminary has produced 50 priests, mostly serving the Archdiocese of Capiz and hundreds of successful Mariani alumni are working in various field.

On September 8, 2024, the seminary commemorated its 25th canonical establishment anniversary with an episcopal coronation for the venerated image of Sancta Maria Mater et Regina, titular patroness. The eucharistic celebration was presided by Cardinal Jose Advincula, Archbishop of Manila, and the statue was crowned by Victor Barnuevo Bendico, Archbishop of Capiz.

== Formation Team ==
- Most Rev. Victor B. Bendico, D.D. - Archbishop of Capiz
- Rector: Fr. John Carl R. Robles, PhL-MA
- Vice-Rector: Fr. Rey Capapas
- Registrar: Fr. Reupert Manuel Garcia
- Procurator: Fr. Michael Reeve Montorio
- Procurator: Fr. Hero Frias
- Spiritual Director (Configuration Stage): Fr. Alvin Nadate
- Spiritual Director (Discipleship Stage): Fr. Aldrin Aquillo
- Socio Cultural Director: Fr. Dante Diama, Jr.
- Dean of Philosophy: Fr. Cornelio D. Delfin, PhD
- Dean of Theology: Fr. Dennis Dexter Sontillano

== Pian Alumni Association ==
The St. Pius X Seminary Alumni Association, Inc., or PIANS, is a non-profit and non-stock corporation whose membership is composed of persons who have studied for at least one year in St. Pius X Seminary. It's not an ordinary alumni association because the seminary is not an ordinary educational institution created and incorporated solely under a national law, and regulated by the appropriate government agencies, such as the Department of Education and the SEC, but was also created under the laws of the Church and regulated by the Vatican, and administered by the bishop through his priests. Further, its purpose is not only to educate but also to train boys and young men for the presbytery and the future leaders of the Church.

Since the opening of the seminary almost 50 years ago, there are usually ordinations every year. Three Pians have become bishops. Though the association is composed of Pians (ex-seminarians), it is not a religious or ecclesiastical organization or corporation like the Children of Mary, Knights of Columbus and Couples for Christ.

== Student life ==
- Seminarians from Sancta Maria, Mater et Regina, Seminarium are called Mariani (they are also called Pians).
- Most students of SMMRS are graduates from SPXS, with the exception of some transferees from other seminaries in other dioceses.
- Only St. Pius X Seminary and Sancta Maria, Mater et Regina, Seminarium have Latin and Spanish subjects in Capiz.
- Aside from Classes, the seminarians from SMMRS are also grouped by Zones which were also named after the saints the pioneers chose during the seminary founding. Zones are like the seminarians' family next to the class. Zones are comprised by seminarians of year levels and members of each zones will always belong to the zone they picked even when they become priests or when they leave the institution. The zones are:
- Heralds (Zone 1 - Saint Charles Borromeo),
- Thomite Steels (Zone 2 - Saint Thomas Aquinas),
- Jumon Knights (Zone 3 - Saints Simon and Jude),
- Skull Bearers (Zone 4 - Saint Bruno),
- Kikos (Zone 5 - Saint Francis of Assisi),
- Magis (Zone 6 - Saints Isaac Jogues and John De Brebeuf).

== See also ==
- St. Pius X Seminary
- List of Roman Catholic Seminaries
