= Ivano-Frankivsk Theological Academy of Greek-Catholic Church =

Religious university in Ivano-Frankivsk, Ukraine

Coordinates: 48°55′47″N 24°42′39″E

- Івано-Франківська Теологічна Академія Греко-Католицької Церкви
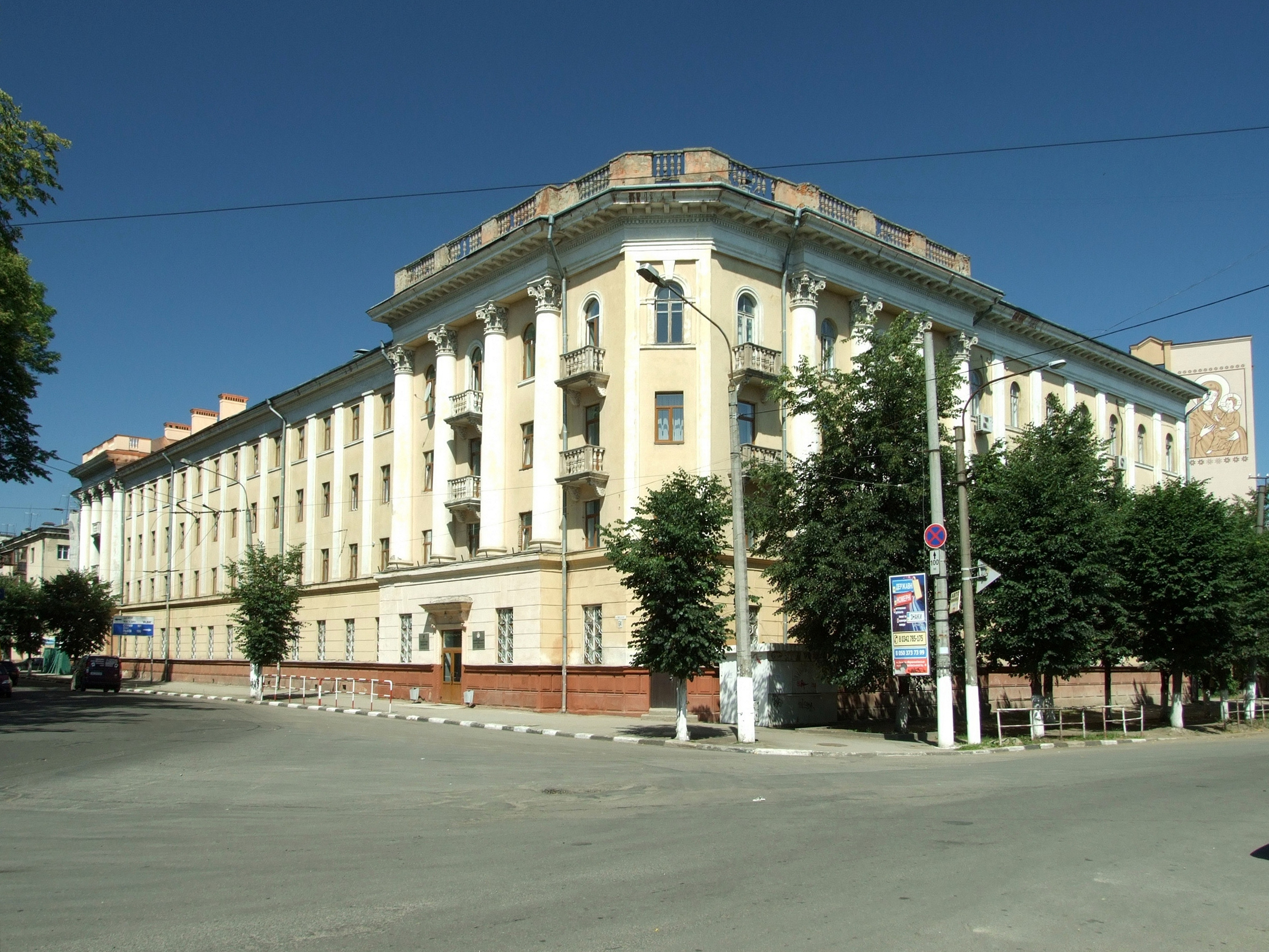
- Established: 1991
- Rector: Oleksandr Levytskyi
- Students: 1,000
- Location: Ivano-Frankivsk, Ukraine

Ivano-Frankivsk Theological Academy of Greek-Catholic Church is a Ukrainian University in Ivano-Frankivsk.

Ivano-Frankivsk Theological and Catechetical Theological Institute was reorganized in 2000 into the Ivano-Frankivsk Theological Academy.

On July 30, 2014, the Theological Academy was renamed Ivano-Frankivsk Theological University named after St. John Chrysostom.

On May 21, 2018, the university was reorganized into a private institution of higher education "Ivano-Frankivsk Academy of Ivan Zolotousty"

The purpose of the academy is the development of theological and philosophical sciences and related disciplines.

== History ==
The university opened on July 21, 1991, as Ivano-Frankivsk Theological-Catechetical Spiritual Institute on the basis of the Ivano-Frankivsk Theological Seminary. The seminary continued on separately as Ivano-Frankivsk Higher Spiritual Seminary. In 1996, the first entrants finished the Theological Institute. In 2000, on the basis of the Spiritual Institute, the Ivano-Frankivsk Theological Academy was founded.

After coming out of the UGCC underground in 1989 and the proclamation of Ukraine's independence in 1991, active work began to resume the educational process at the Ivano-Frankivsk Theological Seminary of the UGCC named after St. Martyr Josaphat, which was the first in the former USSR. It hosted in-service and part-time training for serving clerics and future clerics. Auditoriums were rented for lectures in various institutions of the city, but the main room was the assembly hall of the Basilian monastery in Maizly (Ivano-Frankivsk). This choice was due to the fact that the first room of the seminary on Sirika Street 3 could not accommodate all students.

The teachers were professors educated before the Second World War, some of the teachers were from local universities, and teachers from Ukrainian emigration were also invited. Initially, more than 400 seminarians entered the first year, and the following year the number of seminarians, including distance learning, was about 900 people. Ordinary Bishop Sofron Dmyterko of Ivano-Frankivsk made efforts to establish and organize the educational institution. It was he who began to seek the return of the building on Sister Vasilianok Street for the establishment of a theological school there. He also initiated repairs in it for fitness for training. Iryna Bilyk was appointed the third rector of the Seminary in 1990.

On July 25, 1991, the Ivano-Frankivsk Theological and Catechetical Theological Institute was registered by the Council for Religion under the Cabinet of Ministers of the Ukrainian SSR (State Com. Of Religions), and the seminary continued its activities separately as the Ivano-Frankivsk Higher Theological Seminary. seminary". With the new registration and the involvement of more professors on the basis of this seminary in 1996 began graduating from the Theological Institute. It later became the current Theological Academy. Nuns and candidates for monasticism began to study at the catechetical and pedagogical faculty. Priests returned from abroad after defending their degrees and joined the teaching staff of emigration teachers.

The establishment of the Theological Academy was made by the bishop of the Ivano-Frankivsk diocese Sofron Mudry [2], who was a professor during its existence as the "Ivano-Frankivsk Theological and Catechetical Spiritual Institute". He was appointed in 1994 the fourth rector of the Ivano-Frankivsk seminary. Among the first students were not only natives of Ukraine, but also from the Republic of Belarus, Marmara region (Romania), the Russian Federation and others.

== Institutes and faculties ==
4 Faculties function in the structure of the university.

- Faculty of Philosophy
- Faculty of Theology
- Catechetical and Pedagogical Faculty
- Cantor and Regency Faculty
