= Pian-e Olya =

Pian-e Olya پيان عليا
- Village
- Location within Iran
- Coordinates: 31°57′25″N 49°48′15″E
- Country: Iran
- Province: Khuzestan
- County: Izeh
- Bakhsh: Central
- Rural District: Pian

Population (2006)
  - Total: 121
- Time zone: UTC+3:30 (IRST)
  - Summer (DST): UTC+4:30 (IRDT)

Pian-e Olya (Persian: پيان عليا, also Romanized as Pīān-e ‘Olyā; also known as Pīān-e Bālā) is a village in Pian Rural District, in the Central District of Izeh County, Khuzestan Province, Iran. At the 2006 census, its population was 121, in 25 families.
