= Kyiv Theological Seminary of the Three Holy Hierarchs =

Coordinates: 50°27′28.4″N 30°44′40.8″E

- Kniazhychi; Ukraine

Information
- School type: Seminary
- Motto: Wisdom. Holiness. Love.
- Denomination: Ukrainian Greek-Catholic
- Patron saint: Three Holy Hierarchs
- Established: 2010 (new seminary) 1790 (predecessor)
- Founder: Lubomyr Husar
- Oversight: Ukrainian Catholic Archeparchy of Kyiv, Ukrainian Catholic Archiepiscopal Exarchate of Lutsk, Ukrainian Catholic Archiepiscopal Exarchate of Kharkiv, Exarchate of Odesa-Crimea, Exarchate of Donetsk
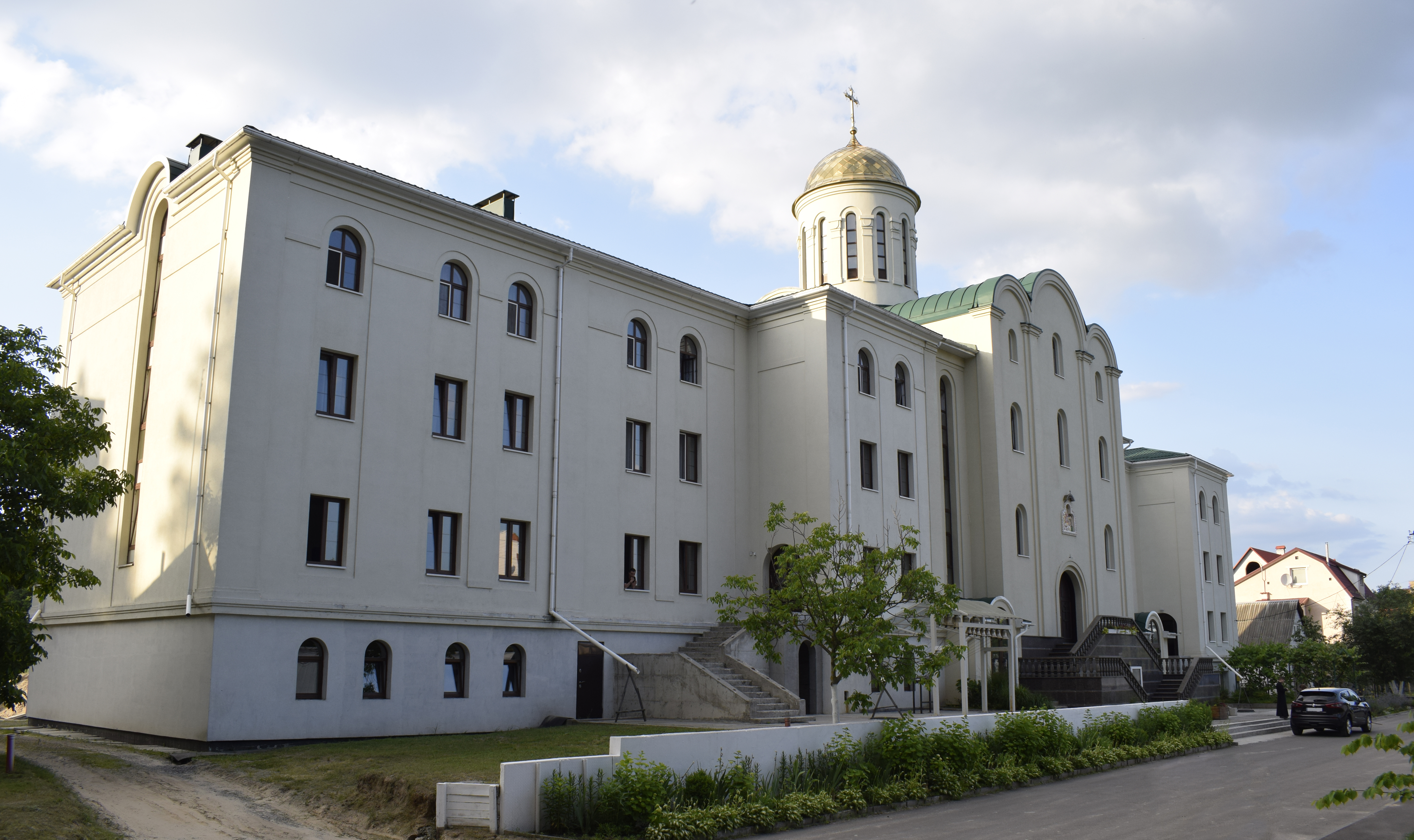

Kyiv Theological Seminary of the Three Holy Hierarchs is seminary of the Ukrainian Greek Catholic Church near Kyiv, Ukraine, which is jointly administered by the Ukrainian Catholic Archeparchy of Kyiv and the missionary exarchates of Lutsk, Kharkiv, Odesa, and Donetsk.

When the Ukrainian Greek Catholic Church was banned in the Russian Empire in the 19th century, the Church existed only in Western Ukraine and the diaspora. After Ukraine declared independence from the Soviet Union in 1991, the UGCC began to return to Central and Eastern Ukraine. The See of Lviv and Halych was returned to Kyiv in 2004 after a nearly 200-year exile. Soon thereafter, the seminary was created by Patriarch Lubomyr Husar to serve the new territories.

There had existed a Ukrainian Catholic seminary in Radomyshl serving the See of Kyiv at the end of the 18th century, and that is also sometimes cited as among the origins of the modern-day seminary.

The current seminary is affiliated with the Ukrainian Catholic University and accredited by the Holy See.
