= Pian-e Sofla =

Pian-e Sofla پيان سفلي
- Village
- Location within Iran
- Coordinates: 31°58′04″N 49°47′49″E
- Country: Iran
- Province: Khuzestan
- County: Izeh
- Bakhsh: Central
- Rural District: Pian

Population (2006)
  - Total: 249
- Time zone: UTC+3:30 (IRST)
  - Summer (DST): UTC+4:30 (IRDT)

Pian-e Sofla (Persian: پيان سفلي, also Romanized as Pīān-e Soflá; also known as Pīān-e Pā‘īn) is a village in Pian Rural District, in the Central District of Izeh County, Khuzestan Province, Iran. At the 2006 census, its population was 249, in 39 families.
